= 2002 ISAF Youth Sailing World Championships – Byte CII =

Byte CII at the 2002 ISAF Youth Sailing World Championships
- Venue: Lunenburg, Canada
- Dates: 18–27 July

Medalists
gold medal	Jennifer Spalding	Canada
silver medal	Karin Söderström	Sweden
bronze medal	Paige Railey	United States

The Byte CII competition at the 2002 ISAF Youth Sailing World Championships took place from 18 to 27 July. 20 sailors competed, with Canadian Jennifer Spalding winning the event.

== Results ==
Pos	Helm	Country	R1	R2	R3	R4	R5	R6	R7	R8	R9	R10	R11	R12	Total	Nett
1st	Jennifer Spalding	Canada	(7)	3	DSQ (21)	3	1	2	6	2	4	5	1	7	62.0	34.0
2nd	Karin Söderström	Sweden	4	2	2	2	(12)	6	(8)	8	3	2	3	5	57.0	37.0
3rd	Paige Railey	United States	1	OCS (21)	5	1	2	1	5	7	8	4	(16)	8	79.0	42.0
4th	Silja Lehtinen	Finland	5	6	1	4	5	5	(15)	(9)	9	7	5	4	75.0	51.0
5th	Sarah Steyaert	France	3	1	13	8	6	DNC (21)	1	1	(16)	11	9	2	92.0	55.0
6th	Kate O'Brien	New Zealand	9	OCS (21)	3	10	3	(15)	2	15	6	3	7	1	95.0	59.0
7th	Maike Landman	Netherlands	11	4	6	5	8	(14)	7	6	1	6	6	(12)	96.0	60.0
8th	Krystal Weir	Australia	6	11	9	(13)	4	3	4	5	10	(16)	12	3	86.0	67.0
9th	Hanne Jansch	Germany	8	OCS (21)	10	(18)	14	4	3	3	12	1	2	17	113.0	74.0
10th	Katarzyna Rudawska	Poland	10	7	4	6	(11)	10	(16)	11	5	8	4	11	103.0	76.0
11th	Colette Blair	United Kingdom	2	8	7	9	7	9	9	(17)	(18)	15	8	15	124.0	89.0
12th	Carmen Parreno	Spain	16	OCS (21)	8	15	13	11	13	4	DNC (21)	13	15	6	156.0	114.0
13th	Odile Ginaid	Brazil	15	13	12	7	10	12	(18)	16	7	9	(20)	14	153.0	115.0
14th	Anna Cerna	Czech Republic	18	5	16	11	(19)	7	(19)	10	2	14	19	16	156.0	118.0
15th	Sara Carmo	Portugal	13	OCS (21)	11	12	(18)	8	14	13	17	10	10	13	160.0	121.0
16th	Christa Kobaek	Denmark	17	9	17	17	9	13	10	DSQ (21)	11	12	(18)	9	163.0	124.0
17th	Ayda Unver	Turkey	14	15	15	(20)	20	18	11	DNF (21)	13	19	13	10	189.0	148.0
18th	Siobhan Tam	Singapore	(19)	12	(19)	16	17	17	17	12	14	18	11	18	190.0	152.0
19th	Eriko Katsuma	Japan	12	14	18	(19)	16	16	12	18	15	17	17	(19)	193.0	155.0
20th	Nicola Silberbauer	South Africa	(20)	10	14	14	15	19	DNC (21)	14	19	20	14	20	200.0	159.0
