= David B. Moriarty =

British soldier killed during the Anglo-Zulu War at the Battle of Intombe

David Barry Moriarty
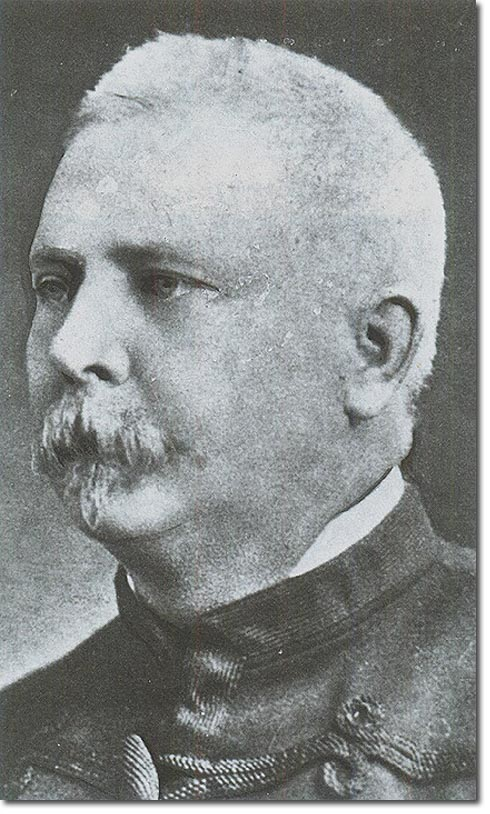
- Born: 6 March 1837; Kilmallock, County Limerick, Ireland
- Died: 12 March 1879 (aged 42); Intombe River, Zulu Kingdom
- Military career
- Allegiance: United Kingdom
- Branch: British Army
- Service years: 1837 — 1879
- Rank: Captain
- Units: 6th (Royal Warwickshire) Regiment; 80th Regiment of Foot (Staffordshire Volunteers)
- Conflicts: Anglo-Zulu War: Battle of Intombe †

David Barry Moriarty (1837-1879) was an Irish officer in the British Army who was most notable for commanding the 80th Regiment of Foot during the Battle of Intombe, in which he was killed during the fighting.

== Biography ==
Moriarty was born in Ireland on 6 March 1837 as the sixth son of James Moriarty and Mary Catherine Bridget Barry in Kilmallock, County Limerick. At the age of 16, he signed up for the 6th West York Militia as a Lieutenant. On 19 December 1857, he was gazetted to an ensign at the 2nd Battalion of the 6th Regiment and brought over 100 men to the regiment. In April 1870, he achieved an unattached company due to his extensive experience. Moriarty served with his regiments at Gibraltar, Corfu and Zante. While at Jamaica, he was offered an exchange to the 1st Battalion, to which he accepted and headed for Ireland then later, went Queenstown to Bombay.

Moriarty later served in the 6th (Royal Warwickshire) Regiment until being transferred to the 80th Regiment of Foot (Staffordshire Volunteers) in 1876. Moriarty was described for his "affability and a relaxed attitude to his duties".

=== Anglo-Zulu War ===
When the Anglo-Zulu War broke out, after news on the Battle of Isandlwana, fearing of a Zulu attack, Charles Tucker sent Moriarty and 106 infantry to bring in a convoy to supply the village of Lüneburg. The convoy attempted to ferry the river but was poorly conducted, much to the dismay of Tucker. Meanwhile, while the convoy was still trying to ferry the river, Mbilini waMswati gathered up a Zulu army of around 800 men and attacked the British positions early on the morning of 12 March. Moriarty himself grew complacent and charged outside with a revolver and killed 3 Zulu before getting stabbed with his final words being: "Fire away boys, death or glory! I'm done".
