= 2002 ISAF Youth Sailing World Championships =

Event title
- Edition: 32nd

Event details
- Venue: Lunenburg, Canada
- Dates: 18 - 27 July 1994

The 2002 ISAF Youth Sailing World Championships took place in Lunenburg, Canada from 18 to 27 July. It was the 32nd edition of the ISAF Youth Sailing World Championships.

== Competition format ==
=== Events and equipment ===
Event	Equipment
Men's dinghy (single hander)	Laser
Men's skiff	29er
Men's windsurfer	Minstral
Women's dinghy (single hander)	Byte CII
Women's skiff	29er
Women's windsurfer	Minstral

== Summary ==
=== Medal table ===
* Host nation (Canada)

Rank	Nation	Gold	Silver	Bronze	Total
1	New Zealand	1	1	1	3
2	Australia	1	1	0	2
3	United States	1	0	1	2
4	Canada*	1	0	0	1
4	Great Britain	1	0	0	1
4	Poland	1	0	0	1
7	Croatia	0	1	0	1
7	Greece	0	1	0	1
7	Spain	0	1	0	1
7	Sweden	0	1	0	1
11	France	0	0	1	1
11	Germany	0	0	1	1
11	Hong Kong	0	0	1	1
11	Switzerland	0	0	1	1
Totals (14 entries)		6	6	6	18

=== Event medalists ===
==== Men's events ====
Event	First	Second	Third
Laser	Andrew Campbell; United States	Ivan Kljakovic Gaspic; Croatia	Tobias Schadewaldt; Germany
29er	Nathan Outteridge; Ayden Menzies; Australia	Geoff Woolley; Mark Overington; New Zealand	Guillavme Vigna; Thibaut Gatti; France
Minstral	Thom Ashley; New Zealand	Byron Kokkalanis; Greece	Jan Schenk; Switzerland

==== Women's events ====
Event	First	Second	Third
Byte CII	Jennifer Spalding; Canada	Karin Soderstrom; Sweden	Paige Railey; United States
29er	Pippa Wilson; Jenny Marks; Great Britain	Elise Rechichi; Rashele Martin; Australia	Rachel O'Brien; Kelly Riechelmann; New Zealand
Minstral	Zofia Klepacka; Poland	Blanca Manchon; Spain	Wai Man Chan; Hong Kong
