= Byte (dinghy) =

Single handed sailing dinghy

- Class symbol

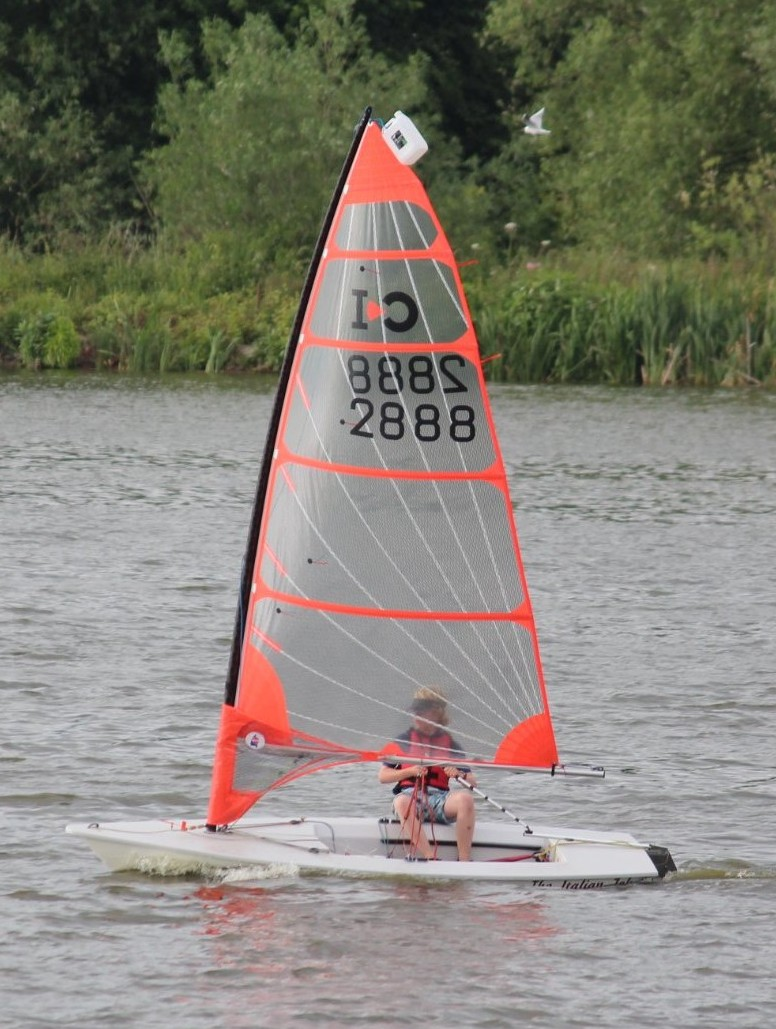
- Line drawing of the Byte CII rig

Development
- Designer: Ian Bruce
- Name: Byte

Boat
- Crew: 1

Hull
- Type: Monohull
- Construction: GRP
- Hull weight: 100 lb (45 kg)
- LOA: 12 ft (3.7 m)
- Beam: 4 ft 3 in (1.30 m)

Sails
- Mainsail area: 73 sq ft (6.8 m^{2})

Racing
- D-PN: 97.4 (91.4 C-II)
- RYA PN: CII - 1123; CI - 1223

The Byte is a single-handed sailing dinghy designed by Canadian Ian Bruce, who also commissioned and marketed the Laser. The Byte has three sail choices, the Byte Classic, the Byte CI, and the Byte CII with the CII being the most commonly sailed. The CII has been sailed at the Youth Olympic Games in 2010 and 2014 and the classic at the Youth Sailing World Championships in 2000 and 2002.

== Design ==
The Byte is 12 ft (3.7 m) long, 4 ft 3 in (1.30 m) wide and roughly 100 pounds (45 kg). The hull is composed of glass reinforced polyester and foam sandwich. The Byte is designed for sailors weighing 120 to 145 lb (54 to 66 kg) although most sailors weighing 90 to 160 lb (41 to 73 kg) should have no problems sailing this boat on a recreational basis.

The rigging is similar to that of the Laser except one noticeable difference. The traveler is just below the main sheet block and not at the stern of the boat (similar to a Finn or Europe dinghy). This eradicates the chance of the main sheet getting caught on the transom which is a common complaint of the Laser. The sail controls are also "split" and led to both side-decks, again somewhat like a Finn or Europe and allows for more technical adjustments.

=== Byte Classic ===
The Byte Classic sail size is only 58 square feet (5.4 square metres) making it the ideal boat for those sailors who enjoy the independence and simplicity of a cat rigged boat, such as the Laser, but who are not strong or heavy enough to control a large sail.

=== Byte CII ===
Line drawing of the Byte CII rig

The Byte was updated in 2004 with the development of a fully battened sail and two piece carbon-fibre mast. This CII rig has a slightly larger sail made of mylar and similar in appearance to the 29er sails. The new rig is designed to be self-depowering and was a welcome update to the previous byte rig. The inspiration for the new rig and sail was to create an out-of-the-box, cost effective, women's and youth boat. These developments give a speed improvement reflected in the Byte CII's Portsmouth Yardstick of 1123 and D-PN of 91.4.

=== Byte CI ===
The Byte CI acts as an alternative for the CI in heavy weather or for lighter sailors. It's Portsmouth Yardstick number was 1223 as of 2026.

== Fleets ==
Although the Byte class operates on numerous continents, its largest fleets have historically been in Canada, Singapore, Bermuda, Great Britain and Switzerland.

The class is no longer recognised by World Sailing, with very few sailors and active class accoiations around the world. The 2025 British Nationals that were scheduled to take place on Hayling Island were cancelled due to lack of entrants. The last Byte national championship to be held anywhere in the world took place in July 2024 at Weymouth and Portland National Sailing Academy in England. 10 boats competed in the event with Duncan Glen winning the CII and Jessica Skelding winning the all junior CI event.

== Events ==
=== Youth Olympic Games ===
The Byte dinghy was used for both male and female competitors in the Youth Olympic Games during the first two events held in Singapore and Nanjing.

==== Boys ====
Games	Gold	Silver	Bronze
2010	Ian Barrows (ISV)	Florian Haufe (GER)	Just Van Aanholt (AHO)
2014	Cheok Khoon Bernie Chin (SIN)	Rodolfo Pires (POR)	Jonatán Vadnai (HUN)

==== Girls ====
Games	Gold	Silver	Bronze
2010	Lara Vadlau (AUT)	Daphne van der Vaart (NED)	Constanze Stolz (GER)
2014	Samantha Yom (SIN)	Odile van Aanholt (NED)	Jarian Brandes (PER)

=== Class World Championships ===
==== Open ====
Event	Gold	Silver	Bronze
1999	Eric Holden (CAN)	Alexander Kirkland (BER)	Leete Parker Garrett (USA)
2001 (Canada) Mantoloking	Silja Lehtinen; Nylandska Jakt (FIN)	Alex Singer (CAN)	Griffin Hewitt (CAN)
2005 (Italy) Lage Garda	Jean Baptiste Bernaz (FRA)	Hao Lo Jun (SIN)	Ming Leong Kwong (SIN)

==== Men's ====
Event	Gold	Silver	Bronze
2006; Bermuda	Nicolas DeCruz (SIN)	Malcom Smith (BER)	Jonathan Chew (BER)
2008 (United Kingdom) Weymouth	Jon Emmett (GBR)	Lei Fengyi (SIN)	Herman Nurfendi Bin Awmad (SIN)

==== Women's ====
Event	Gold	Silver	Bronze
2006; Bermuda	Elizabeth Yin (SIN)	Eleanor Gardner (BER)	Hana Blore (GBR)
2008 (United Kingdom) Weymouth	Hannah Blore (GBR)	Sacha Roberts (CAN)	Shevaun Su-Lyn Sethi (SIN)

=== Youth Sailing World Championships ===
The Byte CII was one of two boats designated in the ISAF Regulations for use as the Girl's One Person Dinghy for the ISAF Youth Sailing World Championships. The other is the Laser Radial. The Byte CII has been used at two Youth World Championships, in 2000 and 2002.

Year	Gold	Silver	Bronze
2000 results	Siren Sundby (NOR)	Kalarzyna Brzoska (POL)	Hanne Jansch (GER)
2002 results	Jennifer Spalding (CAN)	Karin Söderström (SWE)	Paige Railey (USA)

== Builders ==
The Byte CII is produced by Hartley Boats (UK) and Nautivela (Italy). It has been previously produced by Zou Inter Marine, Zim Sailing, Nautivela SRL, Xtreme Sailing Products, Armada Boats and by Performance Sailcraft Pty Ltd, Sydney, Australia.
