= 2005 ISAF Youth Sailing World Championships – Laser Radial =

Girl's Laser Radial at the 2015 ISAF Youth Sailing World Championships
- Venue: Busan, South Korea
- Dates: 14 - 23 July 2005
- Competitors: 31 from 31 nations

Medalists
gold medal	Paige Railey	United States
silver medal	Xu Lijia	China
bronze medal	Alison Young	Great Britain

The girl's Laser Radial competition at the 2005 ISAF Youth Sailing World Championships took place from 14 to 23 July. 31 sailors from 31 nations competed. Paige Railey of the United States won the event.

== Results ==
Pos	Helm	Country	R1	R2	R3	R4	R5	R6	R7	R8	R9	R10	R11	Nett
1	Paige Railey	United States	1	2	1	1	2	1	(13)	1	(32) OCS	7	1	17
2	Xu Lijia	China	2	1	(32) OCS	(32) OCS	1	3	5	2	1	1	6	22
3	Alison Young	United Kingdom	(13)	3	7	(14)	3	7	1	5	5	4	2	37
4	Tina Mihelic	Croatia	7	(12)	4	3	6	(19)	2	9	6	12	3	52
5	Alberte Holm Lindberg	Denmark	6	6	9	(32) OCS	(16)	4	3	12	4	9	5	58
6	Lucia Reyes	Spain	(14)	7	(18)	8	11	2	10	7	7	3	4	59
7	Janika Puls	Germany	12	4	14	11	7	(20)	(20)	6	2	2	7	65
8	Katarzyna Pic	Poland	5	(13)	12	10	9	9	9	4	9	(18)	10	77
9	Arantza Gumucio	Chile	3	16	5	2	12	(17)	4	17	(18)	6	14	79
10	Olivia Powrie	New Zealand	8	(21)	6	(32) OCS	8	8	11	13	8	5	15	82
11	Vanessa Le Bouteiller	France	10	(25)	(21)	6	19	6	16	3	3	11	9	83
12	Anita Di Iasio	Italy	9	10	3	17	15	12	7	14	10	(26)	(21)	97
13	Stephanie Rosse	Switzerland	4	5	2	(32) OCS	14	14	17	8	26	(28)	8	98
14	Fenanda Coelho	Brazil	11	14	13	(32) OCS	(18)	13	6	16	11	15	12	111
15	Cathrine Gjerpen	Norway	15	9	16	4	(23)	11	(19)	11	15	16	18	115
16	Anneke Bouwmeester	Netherlands	17	8	8	7	(21)	16	21	(32) OCS	14	19	19	129
17	Danielle Dube	Canada	(21)	19	10	21	17	10	(26)	20	16	17	11	141
18	Tania Zimmermann	Peru	18	15	11	5	20	18	15	18	(21.7) DPI	(24)	(23)	141.7
19	Victoria Chan	Singapore	(24)	18	19	(32) OCS	24	5	18	15	13	10	20	142
20	Katerina Vaidisova	Czech Republic	20	17	20	16	5	21	(23)	(32) OCS	23	13	16	151
21	Josefin Persson	Sweden	16	22	23	12	22	15	12	23	(32) OCS	8	(26)	153
22	Samantha England	Australia	23	11	(28)	15	25	22	24	10	12	(32) RAF	13	155
23	Kylie McMillan	Ireland	19	23	(25)	22	10	(26)	8	22	21	14	22	161
24	Phillipa Baer	South Africa	(28)	24	15	9	13	(25)	22	21	20	22	25	171
25	Angela Albela	Puerto Rico	22	20	(26)	24	26	(29)	14	19	19	23	17	184
26	Kaori Takahashi	Japan	26	(27)	27	23	4	24	(28)	24	22	21	24	195
27	Hae-Deun Park	South Korea	25	28	(30)	18	(29)	23	29	27	24	20	29	223
28	Jacqueline Hess	Guatemala	27	29	17	(32) OCS	27	(30)	25	25	27	25	28	230
29	Beth Gertrude	Seychelles	(31)	26	29	13	(31)	27	31	28	28	29	27	238
30	Ng Ai Li	Malaysia	29	-30	24	19	(30)	28	30	26	25	27	30	238
31	Alyson Myers	Bahamas	30	-31	22	20	28	31	27	29	(32) OCS	30	31	248
