= Blore (disambiguation) =

Blore is a village in Staffordshire, England, near Ashbourne.

Blore may also refer to

- Blore, Newcastle-under-Lyme, a hamlet in Staffordshire, England, near Market Drayton
- Blore (surname)

== See also ==
- B'lore
