= Anthony Clarke Booth =

Recipient of the Victoria Cross

Anthony Clarke Booth VC
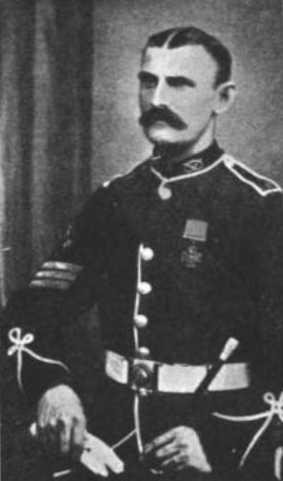
- Born: 21 April 1846; Carrington, Nottinghamshire, England
- Died: 8 December 1899 (aged 53); Brierley Hill, Staffordshire, England
- Burial place: St Michael's Churchyard, Brierley Hill
- Military career
- Allegiance: United Kingdom
- Branch: British Army
- Rank: Colour-Sergeant
- Units: 80th Regiment of Foot (Staffordshire Volunteers)
- Conflicts: Anglo-Zulu War
- Awards: Victoria Cross

Anthony Clarke Booth VC (21 April 1846 – 8 December 1899) was an English recipient of the Victoria Cross, the highest and most prestigious award for gallantry in the face of the enemy that can be awarded to British and Commonwealth forces.

Born in Carrington, Nottingham, he was 32 years old, and a sergeant in the 80th Regiment of Foot (Staffordshire Volunteers) (later The South Staffordshire Regiment), British Army in the Battle of Intombe during the Zulu War when the following deed took place for which he was awarded the VC.

== Action ==
On 12 March 1879 on the Intombe River, South Africa (Zulu War), during an attack by very large numbers of the enemy, Sergeant Booth rallied a few men on the south bank of the river and covered the retreat of 50 soldiers and others for a distance of three miles. Had it not been for the coolness displayed by this NCO not one man would have escaped.

The London Gazette has him as a colour sergeant, but on the day of the Battle of Ntombe (or Battle of Intombe) he was actually a sergeant; his promotion coming the following day to replace a colour sergeant killed in the action. The gazetting of his VC was delayed due to the fact that the surviving officer from the action, Lt. Henry Hollingworth Harward, was court-martialled for cowardice. The trial commenced on 20 February 1880 and concluded on 27 February 1880. Harward escaped the charges brought against him for deserting his men but he resigned his commission in May 1880. During the course of the trial, Booth's award appeared in The London Gazette on 24 February 1880.

His Victoria Cross is displayed at the Staffordshire Regiment Museum in Whittington, Staffordshire.
