= Blore (surname) =

Blore is the surname of:

- Arthur Robert Blore, Royal Navy seaman, winner of the Conspicuous Gallantry Medal and bar
- Edward Blore (1787–1879), British landscape and architectural artist, architect and antiquary
- Edward Blore (cricketer) (1828–1885), English amateur cricketer
- Eric Blore (1887–1959), English comic actor
- Gary Blore, rear admiral of the United States Coast Guard
- Hannah Blore, Welsh professional sailor
- Robert Blore, father and son English sculptors
- Vincent Blore (1907–1997), English footballer

== See also ==
- Blore, village in Staffordshire, England
