= Battle of Intombe =

1879 battle of the Anglo-Zulu War

- Part of the Anglo-Zulu War
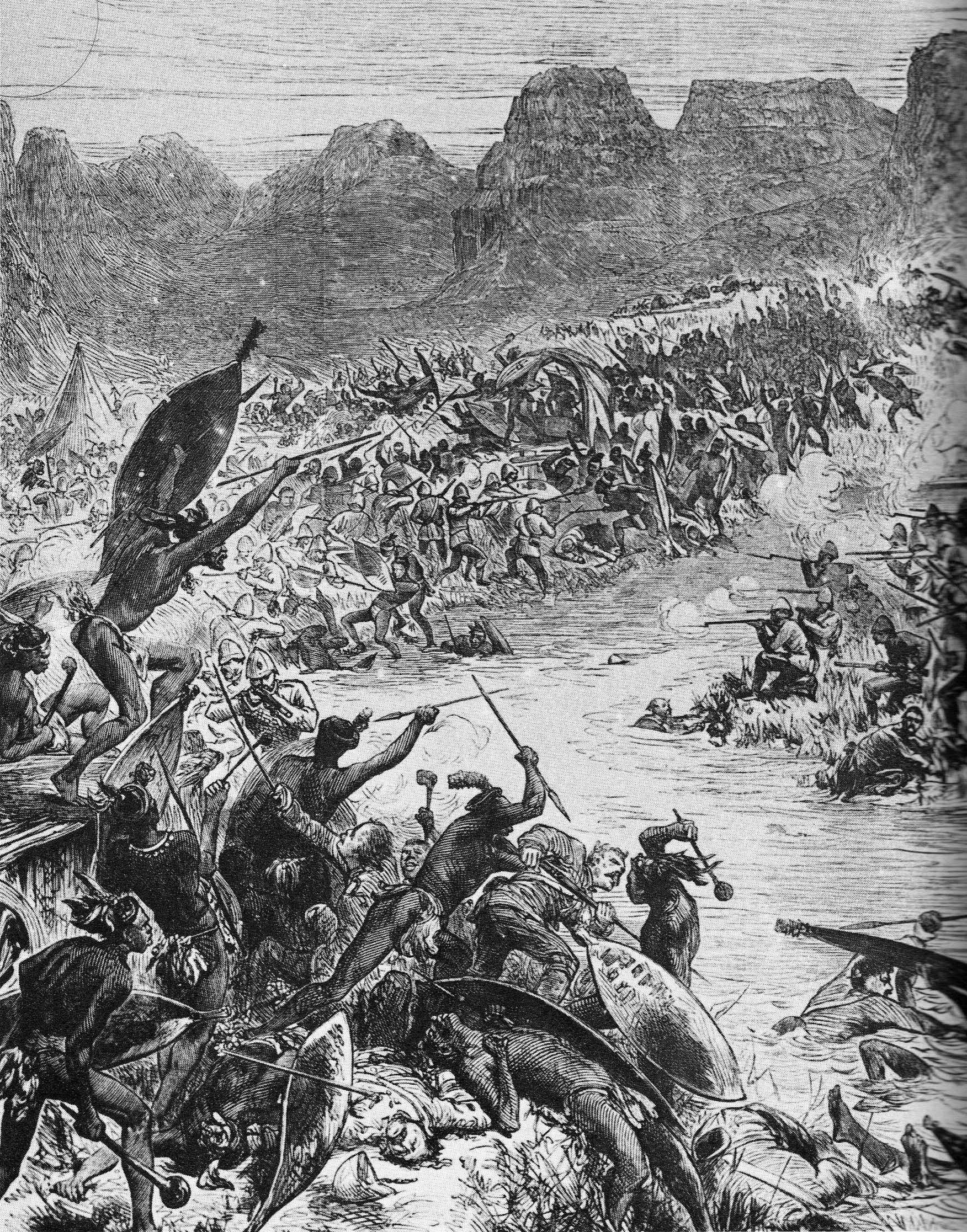
- Battle of the Intombe river (Illustrated London News)
Date	12 March 1879
Location	Right bank of the Intombe river, Zululand, South Africa 27°16′23.7″S 30°40′48.2″E
Result	Zulu victory

Belligerents
(United Kingdom of Great Britain and Ireland) British Empire	Zulu Kingdom

Commanders and leaders
(United Kingdom of Great Britain and Ireland) David Moriarty † (United Kingdom of Great Britain and Ireland) Anthony Booth	Mbilini waMswati; Manyonyoba kaMaqondo Kubheka

Strength
104 troops	500–800

Casualties and losses
62–80 killed (Note: Morris gives 80 killed: 62 British soldiers, 3 conductors and 15 African voorloopers (scouts).)	30

The Battle of Intombe (also Intombi or Intombi River Drift) was an action fought on 12 March 1879, between Zulu troops loyal to Mbilini waMswati and British soldiers and African civilian conductors, drivers and voorloopers (scouts) defending a convoy of wagons on the road from Derby to Lüneburg. The convoy straggled badly along the road due to the rains and bogged on both sides of the Intombe river, which had risen and was in spate due to the rains. Most of the wagons were laagered (parked close together as an obstacle), somewhat haphazardly, close to the river on the Derby side (the north bank) with a small party and two wagons on the Lüneburg side (the south bank).

The Zulu leader Mbilini waMswati and his followers could see how vulnerable the convoy was from the high ground of the Tafelberg. Mbilini assembled a large force of Zulu irregulars and attacked the laager on 12 March. Using the early morning mist for camouflage, the Zulu were able to rush the laager and overrun the British and their African auxiliaries. A few men managed to reach the river and dived in, hoping to be washed across to the south bank, where the small British party there engaged the Zulus on the north bank with rifle-fire. About twelve men from the north bank got across the river and joined the force on the south bank.

The officer commanding the party on the south bank mounted a horse and deserted his men, command devolving on sergeant Anthony Booth who formed square and retreated southwards, holding off Zulus who crossed the river to pursue them. When the officer reached safety he alerted the garrison which set out on every horse that they could find, with 150 infantry following on foot. Booth and his party were rescued and the carnage at the laager examined, the last of the Zulu being seen making their escape with about 250 cattle and much of the supplies from the wagons.

== Background ==
The village of Lüneberg (27°19′1″S 30°36′57″E) was in the disputed territories to the north of Zululand and had been laagered by its 120 white settlers, after news arrived of the Zulu victory at Isandlwana. In the hot weather, conditions in the laager were poor and diseases spread. (Note: In the next few weeks, more people died of typhoid or malaria than the mortality of the previous three years, far more than died at the hands of the Zulu.) The Zulus posed a serious threat to the area which was attacked on the night of 10/11 February. Fearing a repeat of the attack, the British dispatched four companies of the 80th Regiment of Foot (Major Charles Tucker) to garrison the village.

In late February 1879, a convoy of eighteen wagons carrying 90,000 rounds of .577/450 Martini–Henry ammunition, mealies (coarse maize flour), tinned food, biscuits, a rocket battery and other weapons for the 80th Regiment, was sent from Lydenburg to supply the garrison. From the Transvaal border the convoy was escorted by D Company (Captain Anderson accompanied by Lieutenant Daubeney) of the 80th Regiment, from Lüneberg, which rendezvoused on the road from Derby on 1 March. By 5 March, the convoy was still 5 mi (8 km) short of Meyer's Drift, 8 mi (13 km) from Lüneberg, having been hampered by rains which caused the rivers to swell and the ground to soften.

The wagons being shoved most of the way and fearing a Zulu attack, Tucker sent an order to Anderson to reach Lüneberg that night 'at any cost'. The company commander took this literally, abandoned the wagons and returned to Lüneberg. The Swazi pretender Mbilini waMswati and his Zulu irregulars were watching the convoy and as soon as the escort departed, the wagons were attacked by looters, the drivers and voorloopers (scouts) running for Derby. Soon afterwards, an advanced party despatched by Hamu arrived and drove off the looters in turn, who came back as soon as Hamu's men departed; the raiding party lifted stores and forty oxen.

== Prelude ==
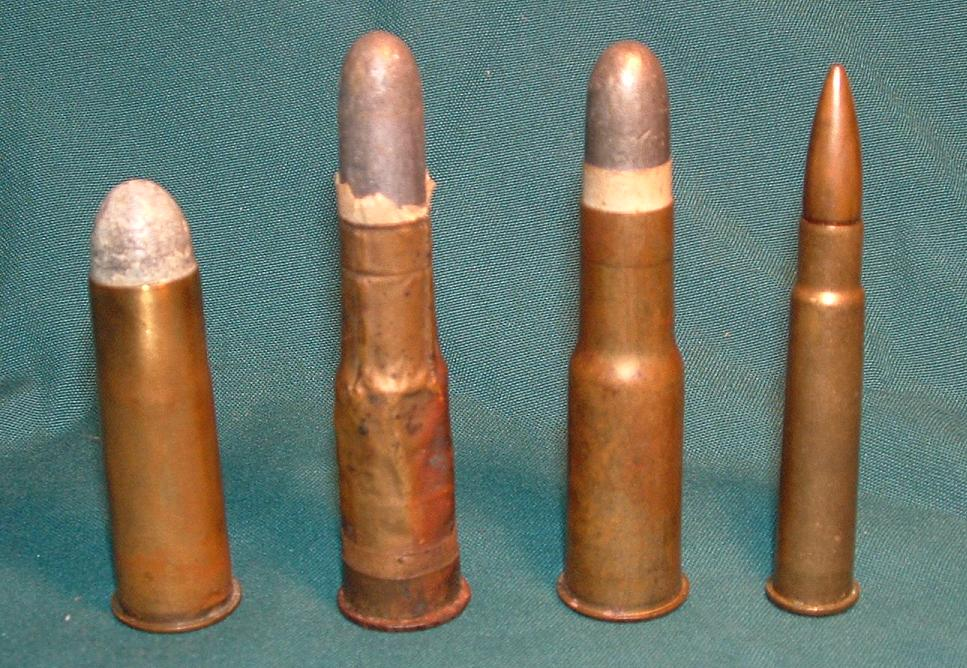
centre bullets are examples of .577/450 Martini–Henry (coiled brass & drawn brass) cartridges

When Anderson reached Lüneberg without the supplies, Tucker was aghast and sent Captain David Moriarty and 106 men to bring in the convoy. The escort had got six wagons to the far bank of the Intombe, 4 mi (6 km) from Lüneberg. Six other wagons were 3 mi (5 km) further back. By the time the Moriarty party reached Meyer's Drift the river had risen; a camp was established on the Lüneberg side and the men began to lash a raft of planks and barrels together with rope. A few men at a time were ferried across, except for a party of 35 commanded by Lieutenant Lindop. On the far side, Moriarty and the rest of the party went to recover the wagons but found that most had been emptied by the looters.

It took until around noon on 11 March to get all of the wagons to the Derby side of the river, by when two wagons had been transported to the Lüneberg side. The Intombe had risen again and was flowing at 7 kn (8 mph; 13 km/h), far too fast to cross. Moriarty ordered the wagons to be laagered for the night. The Moriarty party, out for five nights, soaked through and unable to cook food did not laager the wagons as tightly as possible, leaving gaps between them, in a "V" with the ends at the river. By the afternoon, the river had subsided, leaving the laager wide open at both end of the "V". (Note: Moriarty was no novice, being 42 years old, having campaigned in India, fought against Sekhukhune and had three years' service in South Africa with the 80th Regiment.)

On 11 March, Tucker inspected the laager at the river and found it to be poorly constructed. He was not impressed with the inverted 'V' shape in which the wagons were arranged, with the base at the river. The amount of water in the river had diminished and there was a gap of several yards between river and base. There were other flaws in the arrangement; Tucker considered that it afforded 'no protection whatever in the event of the Zulus attacking in numbers'. The garrison was weakened by being on both sides of the river, thirty men being laagered on the other bank. Mbilini waMswati, the local Zulu leader, gathered about 800 men on a height known as Tafelberg 3 mi (5 km) north-east of the ford (Myer's Drift) to attack the laager. Mbilini reconnoitred the laager late on 11 March and saw how vulnerable it was. Exploiting a mist to approach the laager unseen, Mbilini led his Zulus forward to the attack early on 12 March.

== Battle ==
On the night of 11 March 1879, two sentries were stationed 20 yd (18 m) from the laager but a 50 yd (46 m) rise in front of them limited their line of sight. At 3:30 a.m. on 12 March, a shot was heard close to the camp. The men returned to their beds after Moriarty decided that it was of no consequence. An hour and a half later, a sentry on the far bank saw, through a clearing in the mist, a huge mass of Zulus advancing silently on the camp.

"He at once fired his rifle and gave the alarm", Tucker recorded. "The sentries on the other side did the same. Of course the men were up in a moment, some men sleeping under the wagons and some in the tents; but before the men were in their positions the Zulus had fired a volley, thrown down their guns ... and were around the wagons and on top of them, and even inside with the cattle, almost instantly. So quickly did they come, there was really no defence on the part of our men; it was simply each man fighting for his life, and in a few minutes all was over, our men being simply slaughtered.

— Tucker

Moriarty charged out of his tent with his revolver at the ready and killed three Zulus, before being shot from the front and stabbed with an assegai from behind. He was said to have shouted, "Fire away boys, death or glory! I'm done" as he fell. Few of his comrades managed to put up any resistance and many were cut down. Survivors fled into the river, still in spate, flowing at 7 kn (8.1 mph; 13 km/h), hoping to be washed to the far bank. The troops on the far bank provided as much covering fire as possible. Upon what survivors they could see reaching the Lüneberg side of the river, Lieutenant Henry Hollingworth Harward, Moriarty's second-in-command, gave the order to withdraw as several hundred Zulus were crossing the river. No sooner had he done this, he grabbed the first horse he spotted and fled, abandoning his men.

These survivors were left under the command of Sergeant Anthony Booth. For 3 mi (4.8 km), the Zulus pursued the group of around forty survivors. Whenever they drew closer, several of the bolder troops along with Booth, stopped to deliver a volley, which dispersed their pursuers. Four men who split from the group to take a short cut to Lüneberg were overtaken and killed. The others made it to Raby's Farm, around 2 mi (3.2 km) from Lüneberg, where the Zulus broke off their pursuit; Booth was later awarded the Victoria Cross. The wagons at the laager were looted and all the ammunition and supplies were carried off by the Zulus or destroyed.

Harward arrived at Lüneberg and told Tucker of what had happened; Tucker ordered all his mounted troops to accompany him to the camp and 150 infantry to follow. Tucker and his mounted force spotted "dense masses" of Zulus leaving the scene of the battle as they approached. At the camp, they discovered one soldier who had made a miraculous escape by being carried down the river and then making his way back to the camp. He and two African wagon drivers were the only survivors.

== Aftermath ==
=== Analysis ===
Comparisons can be made between Intombe and Rorke's Drift. At Intombe a force of 500 to 800 Zulu had quickly overrun and defeated over 100 British regular infantry in laager. At Rorke's Drift, over 100 British regular infantry were able to stand off 3,000 to 4,000 Zulu from behind hastily constructed but sturdy fortifications for nearly a day. Intombe demonstrated the vulnerability of the slow and awkward supply lines that the British army was dependent on and the price of complacency. If the Zulus continued to exploit this vulnerability, invading British columns could be halted or turned back.

=== Harward ===
Eight months after the incident, Harward was brought from England, under arrest, charged with "misbehaviour before the enemy and shamefully abandoning a party of the regiment under his command when attacked" and other lesser charges. Harward was acquitted, supposedly because he left to get reinforcements which, by their promptitude, prevented Booth's party from annihilation. Sir Garnet Wolseley was so appalled at the verdict that he added adverse comments to it, which were read to every regiment in the army. Harward resigned his commission in May 1880.

=== Casualties ===
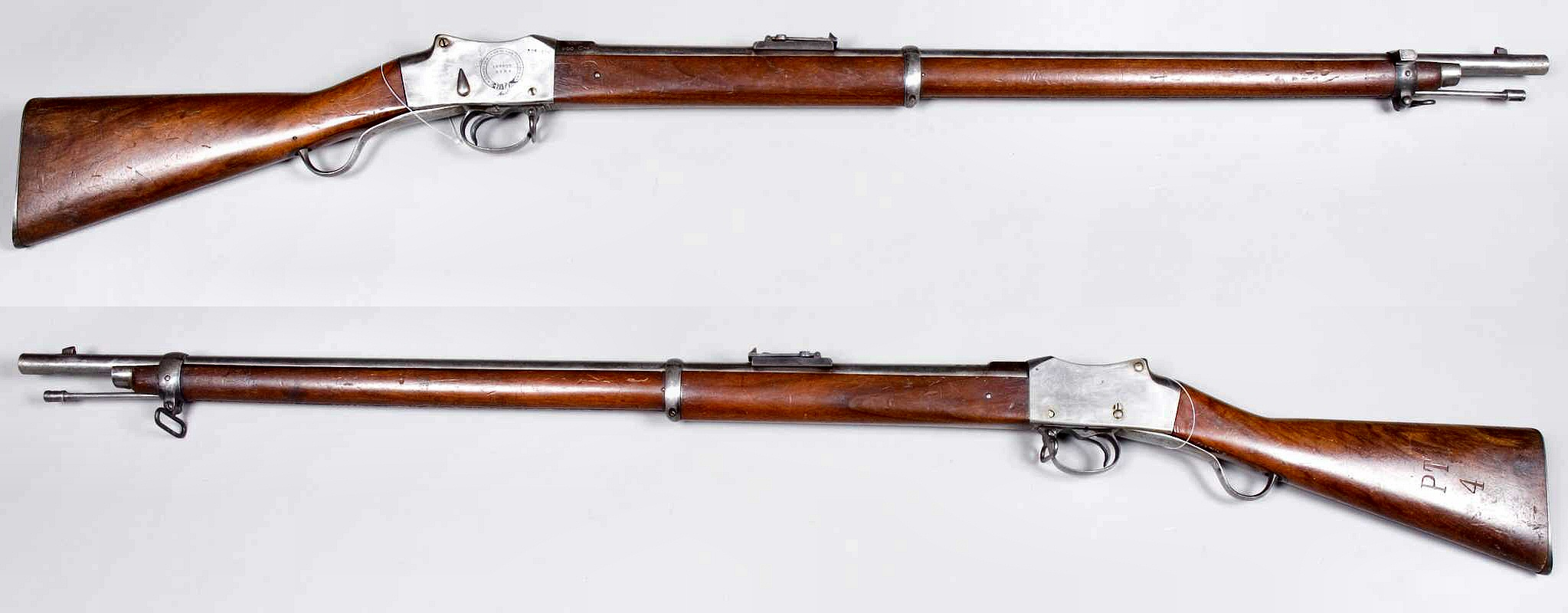
Martini-Henry m1871

In 1988, Donald Morris wrote that the bodies of Captain Moriarty, Surgeon Cobbins, three conductors, fifteen African voorloopers and sixty troops were found in the encampment. In 1995, Ron Lock wrote that there were only around fifty survivors out of the 150 men; for weeks afterwards, as the river rose and fell with the rains, corpses were found in the water and along the banks. Rifles, the 90,000 rounds of Martini-Henry ammunition and 225 lb (102 kg) of gunpowder were also lost. In 1998, Morris wrote of eighty men killed, 62 of the dead being British soldiers along with three conductors and 15 African voorloopers. In 2009, John Laband wrote that one officer and sixty men, a civilian surgeon, two wagon conductors and fifteen African drivers were killed; thirty Zulu dead were found on the banks of the Ntombe. In 2012, Adrian Greaves wrote that the British and their local allies had suffered casualties of an officer, a doctor, 64 other ranks and fifteen Africans killed and twenty missing, presumed drowned.

== See also ==
- Military history of South Africa

== Bibliography ==
- Colenso, Frances E.; Durnford, Edward (1880). History of the Zulu War and its Origin. London: Chapman & Hall. OCLC 469318357 – via Archive Foundation.
- Greaves, A (2012). Forgotten Battles of the Zulu War. Barnsley: Pen & Sword Military. ISBN 978-1-84468-135-8.
- Laband, John (1992). Kingdom in Crisis: The Zulu Response to the British Invasion of 1879. Manchester: Manchester University Press. ISBN 0-71903-582-1.
- Laband, John (2009). Historical Dictionary of the Zulu Wars. Historical Dictionaries of War, Revolution, and Civil Unrest No. 37 (ebook ed.). Lanham, Maryland: Scarecrow Press. ISBN 978-0-8108-6300-2.
- Lock, R. (1995). Blood on the Painted Mountain: Zulu Victory and Defeat, Hlobane and Kambula, 1879. London: Greenhill Books. ISBN 1-85367-201-7.
- Morris, Donald R. (1988). The Washing of the Spears. London: Abacus. ISBN 0-7474-0194-2.
- Morris, Donald R. (1998). The Washing of the Spears. Boston, MA: Da Capo Press. ISBN 0-306-80866-8.
- Theal, George McCall (1919). History of South Africa, from 1873 to 1884: Twelve Eventful Years, with Continuation of the History of Galekaland, Tembuland, Pondoland, and Bethshuanaland until the Annexation of those Territories to the Cape Colony, and of Zululand until its Annexation to Natal (two volumes). London: Allen. OCLC 1067058319 – via Archive Foundation.
