= Mbilini waMswati =

Swazi prince

- Swazi prince and military commander

Pretender to the Swazi throne
- Reign: c. 1865
- Predecessor: King Mswati II
- Successor: King Mbandzeni
- Born: 1843; Kingdom of Swaziland
- Died: April 5, 1879; Hlobane, Zululand
- Spouse: Princess Temave Buhlebendzalo Mbokane
- House: Dlamini
- Father: King Mswati II
- Mother: LaMakhasiso Dvuba

Prince Mbilini (popularly known as Mbilini waMswati; c.1843–1879) was a Swazi prince and military commander. He was the eldest son of King Mswati II with his first wife LaMakhasiso Dvuba. Despite being regarded as his father's favourite son, he could not become King of Swaziland because of custom that a son of a first wife could not be installed. Mbilini was an accomplished military commander and in 1879 he defeated a smaller British force at the Battle of Intombe, during the Anglo-Zulu War.

== Life and political role ==
Prince Mbilini was born in 1843, the eldest son of King Mswati II by his first wife LaMakhasiso Dvuba. From an early age he was said to have inherited his father's military flair, and one rather colourful missionary account suggested that at the age of 12 he had been wrapped in the fresh pelt of a savage dog, in the belief that he would assume some of its ferocity.

Mbilini was apparently King Mswati II's favourite son and when the king died in 1865, Mbilini attempted unsuccessfully to assert a claim to the Swazi succession, losing to his brother.

In April 1866, facing opposition from rival princes and royal councillors, he fled Swaziland and travelled first to Emjindini, Nelspruit and then Lydenburg seeking refuge among the Lydenburg Boers in the South African Republic. In 1867, he left the Lydenburg, passing through Carolina and Ermelo to Mkhondo until he reached Zululand where King Cetshwayo allowed him and his followers to settle.

Cetshwayo permitted Mbilini to settle in the Ntombe valley in the west of Zululand, where he established homesteads near Luneburg and later on the southern slopes of Hlobane. From these bases, Mbilini raided more settled Boer and Zulu settlements. He accumulated followers and cattle, forging alliances with local leaders such as Manyanyoba Khubeka and elements of the abaQulusi.

== Anglo-Zulu war ==
Between 1874 and 1878, Mbilini led a series of raids into the Transvaal and southern Swaziland. Although Cetshwayo publicly distanced himself from these actions when challenged by Boer authorities, Mbilini's activities served Zulu strategic interests by destabilising the border region and testing Boer resilience, with Mbilini being a buffer between Cetshwayo and the Boers. This situation changed with the British annexation of the Transvaal which put the Boers under British protection.

The light in which Mbelini was regarded by the British is shown in a paragraph from a memorandum written by Sir Henry Bulwer the Governor of Natal:

The King disowned Umbilini's acts by saying that Umbilini had been giving him trouble, that he had left the Zulu country in order to wrest the Swazi chieftainship from his brother, the reigning Chief, and that if he returned he should kill him. But there is nothing to show that he has in any way punished him, and, on the contrary, it is quite certain that even if Umbilini did not act with the express orders of Cetywayo, he did so with the knowledge that what he was doing would be agreeable to the King.

In 1877. he made his settlement on the Hlobane mountain, a natural fortress out of the reach of his enemies. Due to the British belief that he was in the pay of the Zulu king, a demand for his surrender appeared in a British ultimatum to the Zulu king.

From there, he attacked the advancing British troops at Zungvini Mountain in January 1879 in the Anglo-Zulu War, and defeated a smaller British force in March at Intombe and Hlobane.

He was killed in a skirmish with British troops on April 5th, 1879.

== Sources ==
- Colenso, Frances E.; Durnford, Edward (1880). History of the Zulu war and its origin;. London: Chapman and Hall.
- Laband, John (2009). Historical dictionary of the Zulu wars. Historical dictionaries of war, revolution, and civil unrest. Lanham, Maryland: Scarecrow Press. ISBN 978-0-8108-6078-0. OCLC 276930370.
