= Luneberg =

Lüneburg is a city in the District of Lüneburg in Lower Saxony, Germany.

The historical English spelling was Lunenburg. Since the Elector of Brunswick-Lüneburg became King of Great Britain in 1707, many places in former British colonies also carry this name.

== Places ==
=== Germany ===
- Lüneburg, a city in the District of Lüneburg in Lower Saxony, Germany
  - Lüneburg (district), in Lower Saxony, Germany
  - Principality of Lüneburg, 1269-1705
- Lüneburg Heath, a large area of heath, geest and woodland in northern Germany

=== Africa ===
- Lüneburg, Namibia, a populated place in Hardap, Namibia
- Luneburg, KwaZulu-Natal, a town in South Africa

=== Canada ===
- Lunenburg, Nova Scotia
- Lunenburg, Nova Scotia (municipal district)
- Lunenburg County, Nova Scotia
- Lunenburg (federal electoral district), Nova Scotia
- Lunenburg (provincial electoral district), Nova Scotia
- Lunenburg, Ontario, in Stormont, Dundas and Glengarry United Counties
- North Lunenburg, Ontario

=== United States ===
- Lunenburg, Arkansas
- Lunenburg, Massachusetts, a New England town
  - Lunenburg (CDP), Massachusetts, the main village in the town
- Lunenburg, Vermont, a New England town
  - Lunenburg (CDP), Vermont, the main village in the town
- Lunenburg, Virginia
- Lunenburg County, Virginia

== Other uses ==
- Lüneberg cheese, made in Austria
- Luneburg lens
- Rudolf Luneburg (1903-1949), professor of mathematics and optics
- Kristen Luneberg, Miss North Carolina USA in 2003

== See also ==
- Lindberg (disambiguation)
- Lindbergh (disambiguation)
- Lunenburg (disambiguation)
