= 2005 ISAF Youth Sailing World Championships =

Event title
- Edition: 35th

Event details
- Venue: Busan, South Korea
- Dates: 14 - 23 July 2005

The Volvo 2005 ISAF Youth Sailing World Championships took place on the Busan, South Korea, from 14 to 23 July. It was the 35th edition of the ISAF Youth Sailing World Championships.

== Competition format ==
=== Events and equipment ===
Event	Equipment
Men's dinghy (single hander)	Laser
Men's dinghy (double hander)	420
Men's windsurfer	Minstral
Women's dinghy (single hander)	Laser Radial
Women's dinghy (double hander)	420
Women's windsurfer	Minstral
Open Multihull	Hobie 16

== Summary ==
=== Medal table ===
* Host nation (South Korea)

Rank	Nation	Gold	Silver	Bronze	Total
1	France	1	3	1	5
2	Great Britain	1	1	2	4
3	United States	1	1	0	2
4	Spain	1	0	1	2
5	Australia	1	0	0	1
5	Poland	1	0	0	1
5	Singapore	1	0	0	1
8	China	0	1	0	1
8	Japan	0	1	0	1
10	Brazil	0	0	1	1
10	Italy	0	0	1	1
10	Netherlands	0	0	1	1
Totals (12 entries)		7	7	7	21

=== Event medalists ===
==== Men's events ====
Event	First	Second	Third
Laser	Giles Scott; Great Britain	Jean Baptiste Bernaz; France	Rutger Van Schaardenburg; Netherlands
420	Wee Chin Teo; Terence Koh; Singapore	Wataru Saito; Hiroto Yoshinaga; Japan	Tom Malindine; James Clark; Great Britain
Minstral	Lukasz Grodzicki; Poland	Pierre Le Coq; France	Juan Moreno; Spain

==== Women's events ====
Event	First	Second	Third
Laser Radial	Paige Railey; United States	Xu Lijia; China	Alison Young; Great Britain
420	Marie Lumeau; Claire Bossard; France	Megan Magill; Briana Provancha; United States	Mariana Basilio; Gabriela Biekarck; Brazil
Minstral	Blanca Manchon Dominguez; Spain	Anne Sophie Le Page; France	Laura Linares; Italy

==== Open events ====
Event	First	Second	Third
Hobie 16	Evan Walker; Kyle Langford; Australia	Tom Phipps; Jon Cook; Great Britain	Julien Villion; Martin Bataille; France
