= Hannah Blore =

Welsh sailor

Hannah Blore is a Welsh professional sailor. She was born in Wrexham, Wales. Now living in the Devon area.

Blore started sailing on the "Flash" at Gresford Sailing club from the age of seven, under the instruction of Harry Bainbridge.

She competed with both the Welsh and GBR National squads. Blore has also competed in the women's single-handed Europe class (previously the women's Olympic Class), in 2007 she gained 3rd in the UK national ranking. Blore has competed in the Byte class dinghy for the past seven years. She was 2nd in the 2002 Byte National championships, and has competed and ranked 1st place 2003, 2004, 2005 in the Inland Championships and in 2005 won five of the six races to take the national championship title.

Blore first gained her world title In 2005 at Lake Garda, Italy. In 2006 she came second behind Elizabeth Yin of Singapore. She regained her World title in 2008 in Weymouth, Great Britain.
