= Anglo-Zulu War =

British colonial war in 1879

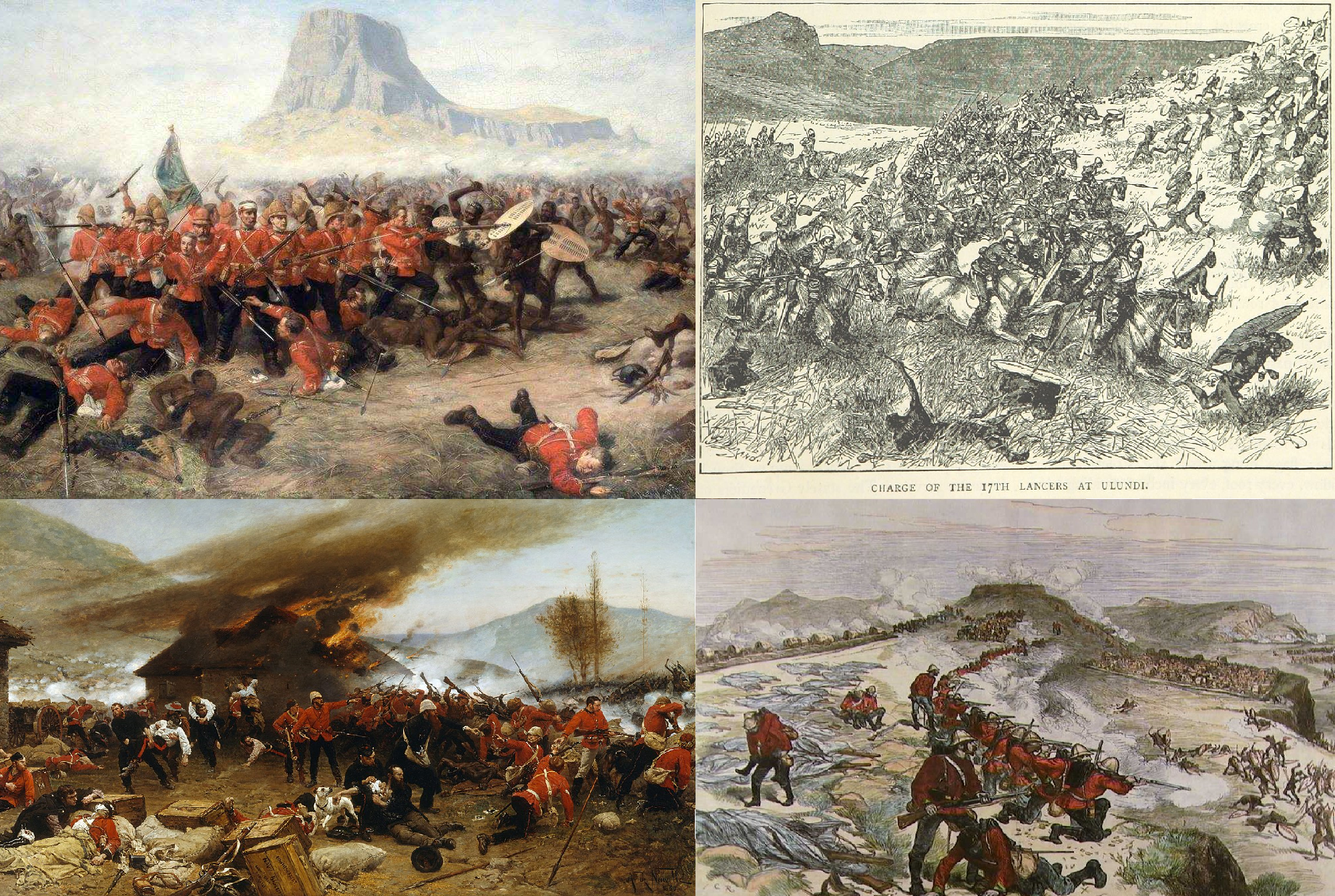
- From top left clockwise: The Battle of Isandlwana, the charge of the 17th Lancers at Ulundi, the British defence of Kambula and the British defence of Rorke's Drift
Date	11 January – 4 July 1879 (5 months, 3 weeks and 2 days)
Location	Zulu Kingdom, present day South Africa
Result	British Victory Division of Zululand, exiling of Cetshwayo to Capetown following his capture at Ulundi, and the uSuthu-Mandlakazi Conflict
Territorial changes	British forced division of Zululand into Chiefdoms with British appointed leaders

Belligerents
United Kingdom; Colony of Natal; Boer Volunteers	Zulu Kingdom

Commanders and leaders
(United Kingdom of Great Britain and Ireland) Benjamin Disraeli (United Kingdom of Great Britain and Ireland) Henry Bartle Frere (United Kingdom of Great Britain and Ireland) Lord Chelmsford (United Kingdom of Great Britain and Ireland) Garnet Wolseley (United Kingdom of Great Britain and Ireland) Richard Thomas Glyn (United Kingdom of Great Britain and Ireland) Evelyn Wood (United Kingdom of Great Britain and Ireland) Anthony Booth (United Kingdom of Great Britain and Ireland) Charles Pearson (United Kingdom of Great Britain and Ireland) John Chard (United Kingdom of Great Britain and Ireland) Gonville Bromhead (United Kingdom of Great Britain and Ireland) Frederick Marshall (United Kingdom of Great Britain and Ireland) Redvers Buller (United Kingdom of Great Britain and Ireland) Anthony Durnford † (United Kingdom of Great Britain and Ireland) Henry Pulleine † (United Kingdom of Great Britain and Ireland) David Moriarty †	Cetshwayo kaMpande; Ntshingwayo Khoza; Dabulamanzi kaMpande; Zibhebhu kaMaphitha; Mbilini waMswati †; Mnyamana Buthelezi; Somopho kaZikhala; Manyonyoba kaMaqondo Kubheka; Godide kaNdlela; Mnyamana kaNgqengelele; Ziwedu kaMpande; Vumindaba kaNthati; Mavumengwana kaNdlela; Msebe kaMadaka; Mkumbikazulu kaSihayo †

Strength
1st invasion: ~17,000 troops (mix of British, colonial and native): No. 1 Column: 4,750; No. 2 Column: 3,871; No. 3 Column: 4,709; No. 4 Column: 2,278; No. 5 Column: 1,565; 19 cannons 1 Gatling gun 2nd invasion: ~23,000–25,000 troops (Note: Colenso 1880, p. 396 gives British and Native strength in April as 22,545.): 17,000 British; 7,000 Africans; 29 cannons 8 Gatling guns	35,000–60,000 Impis (Note: Colenso 1880, p. 318 gives the total strength of the Zulu army at 35,000, of which 4,000 remained with Cetshwayo while the rest marched in two columns.)

Casualties and losses
1,902 killed 268 wounded	6,930 killed 3,500+ wounded 2 captured

The Anglo-Zulu War, or simply the Zulu War, was fought in present-day South Africa from January to early July 1879 between forces of the British Empire and the Zulu Kingdom. Two famous battles of the war were the Zulu victory at Isandlwana and the British defence at Rorke's Drift.

Following the passing of the British North America Act 1867 forming a federation in Canada, Lord Carnarvon thought that a similar political effort, coupled with military campaigns, might lead to a ruling white minority over a black majority in South Africa. This would yield a large pool of cheap labour for the British sugar plantations and mines, and was intended to bring the African Kingdoms, tribal areas, and Boer republics into South Africa.

In 1877, Sir Bartle Frere was appointed as British High Commissioner for Southern Africa to effect such plans. Among the obstacles were the armed independent states of the South African Republic and the Zulu Kingdom.

Frere, on his own initiative, sent a provocative ultimatum on 11 December 1878 to Zulu King Cetshwayo. Upon its rejection, he ordered Lord Chelmsford to invade Zululand. The war had several particularly bloody battles, including an opening victory for the Zulu at the Battle of Isandlwana, followed by the defence of Rorke's Drift by a small British Garrison from an attack by a large Zulu force. However, the British eventually gained the upper hand at Kambula, before taking the Zulu capital of Ulundi. The British eventually won the war, ending Zulu dominance of the region. The British Empire made the Zulu Kingdom a protectorate and later annexed it in 1887.

== Background ==
=== Zulu Kingdom ===
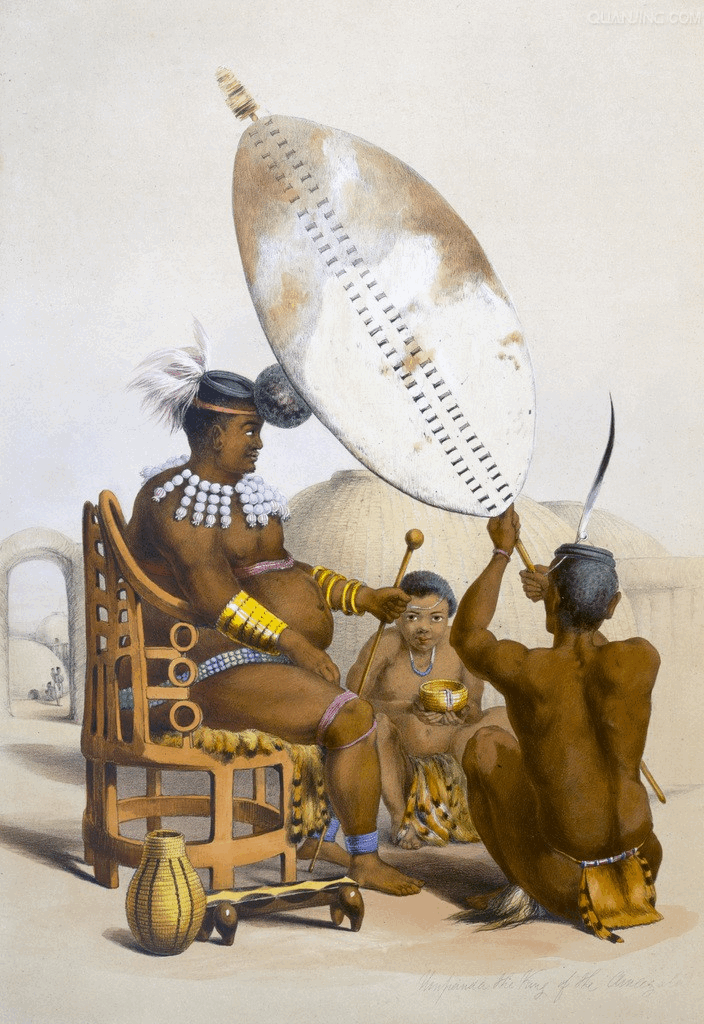
King Mpande

The Zulu Kingdom grew from a small tribe to a large regional power under Shaka in the 1810s, his successors Dingane and Mpande got two powerful new neigbours the Boers and the British Empire. After a civil war in the 1850s Mpande's son Cetshwayo became the heir and de facto ruler.

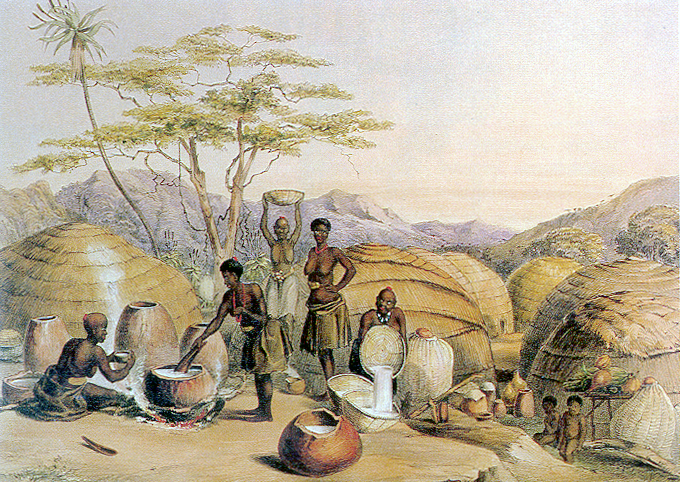
Zulu village, c. 1849

In spite of his dislike for their activities, Cetshwayo permitted European missionaries in Zululand. Though he did not harm or persecute the missionaries themselves, several converts were killed. The missionaries, for their part, were a source of hostile reports. While numerous Zulus of rival factions fled into Natal and some of the surrounding areas, Cetshwayo continued and maintained the peaceful relations with the Natal colonists that had prevailed for decades.

After Mpande died of old age in 1872 Cetshwayo was acclaimed king by his izinduna in 1873 and had a coronation a month later where Shepstone as Natal's Secretary for Native Affairs proclaimed a set of 'coronation laws,' that challenged traditional Zulu social rites.

As ruler, Cetshwayo set about reviving the military methods of his uncle Shaka as far as possible. He formed new age-set regiments and even succeeded in equipping his regiments with a few antiquated muskets and other outdated firearms. Most Zulu warriors were armed with an iklwa (the Zulu refinement of the assegai thrusting spear) and a shield made of cowhide. (Note: Lock & Quantrill 2002, p. 62 quote John Shepstone, Acting Secretary for Native Affairs at the time on the Zulu army: saying "Equipment: Each man carries his shield and assegais, and a kaross or blanket if he possesses one, he may also have a war dress of monkey skins or ox tails, this is all.") The Zulu army drilled in the personal and tactical use and coordination of this weapons system. While some Zulus also had firearms, their marksmanship training was poor and the quality and supply of their powder and shot was dreadful. The Zulu attitude towards firearms was summarized: "The generality of Zulu warriors, however, would not have firearms – the arms of a coward, as they said, for they enable the poltroon to kill the brave without awaiting his attack."

=== Boers ===
Although the Boers were originally from the Dutch Cape Colony many were gradually leaving the now British colony in the Great Trek, partly to escape British Rule but also for more land - and set up a number of Boer republics including the Utrecht Republic in an area that had been depopulated after the expulsion of the Hlubi. In 1860 this would become part of the Republic of Transvaal.

The British government was trying to prevent the Boers gaining an outlet to the sea, as shown by the annexation of the Boer republic of Natalia. To settle a dispute between Portugal and Britain about the ownership of Delagoa bay, the President of France was called in to arbitrate and Patrice de MacMahon awarded the bay to the Portuguese, who were friendly to the Boers. The Transvaal government was already interested in borrowing to build a what would become the Delagoa Bay Railway, and even led discussions to purchase the bay outright. This railway and purchase caused the loss of the only control that the British had, since previously the British could at the very least restrict the supply of arms and ammunition that was exported and fell into the hands of the Boers and natives and thereby rein in what the British saw as the anarchy in the Transvaal. Additionally, the sea outlet that the Boers acquired which was outside the control of the British made persuading the Boers to enter a South African confederation far more difficult, as the Boers as a result achieved greater independence.

By 1877, Sir Theophilus Shepstone, the British Secretary for Native Affairs in Natal, annexed the Transvaal Republic for Britain using a special warrant. The Transvaal Boers objected but as long as the Zulu threat remained, found themselves between two threats; they feared that if they took up arms to resist the British annexation, King Cetshwayo and the Zulus would take the opportunity to attack. The successive British annexations and in particular the annexation of West Griqualand caused a climate of simmering unease for the Boer republics.

The Boers in the Utrecht area initially pledged support for the British, although most withdrew this support after the Boundary Commission granted the land to the Zulus.

=== British Empire ===
==== Expansion ====
In 1795 Britain invaded the Dutch colony of Cape Town and formed Cape Colony, being permanently ceded by the Netherlands in 1814. in 1843, the British government annexed the Boer Republic of Natalia in south-eastern Africa and proclaimed the Colony of Natal. By the 1850s, the British Empire had colonies in southern Africa bordering on various Boer settlements, native African kingdoms such as the Zulus and the Basotho and numerous indigenous tribal areas and states. Various interactions with those groups followed an expansionist policy and its territory expanded very substantially in the 19th century.

The discovery of diamonds in 1867 near the Vaal River, some 550 mi (890 km) northeast of Cape Town, ended the isolation of the Boers in the interior and had a significant effect on events. The discovery triggered a diamond rush that attracted people from all over the world, which turned Kimberley into a town of 50,000 within five years and drew the attention of British imperial interests. In the 1870s, the British annexed West Griqualand, site of the Kimberley diamond discoveries.

==== Confederation ====
In 1874 Lord Carnarvon, Secretary of State for the Colonies, who had brought about federation in Canada in 1867, thought that a similar scheme might work in South Africa, The South African plan called for a ruling white minority over a black majority, which would provide a large pool of cheap labour for the British sugar plantations and mines, Carnarvon, in an attempt to extend British influence in 1875, approached the Boer states of the Orange Free State and the Transvaal Republic and tried to organize a federation of the British and Boer territories but the Boer leaders turned him down.

In 1877, Sir Bartle Frere was made High Commissioner for Southern Africa by Lord Carnarvon. Carnarvon appointed Frere to the position on the understanding that he would work to enforce Carnarvon's confederation plan and Frere could then become the first British governor of a federated southern African dominion. Frere was sent to South Africa as High Commissioner to bring this plan about. One of the obstacles to such a scheme was the presence of the independent Boer states of the South African Republic, informally known as the Transvaal Republic and the Orange Free State, and the Kingdom of Zululand. Bartle Frere wasted no time in putting the scheme forward and manufacturing a casus belli against the Zulu by exaggerating the significance of a number of recent incidents.

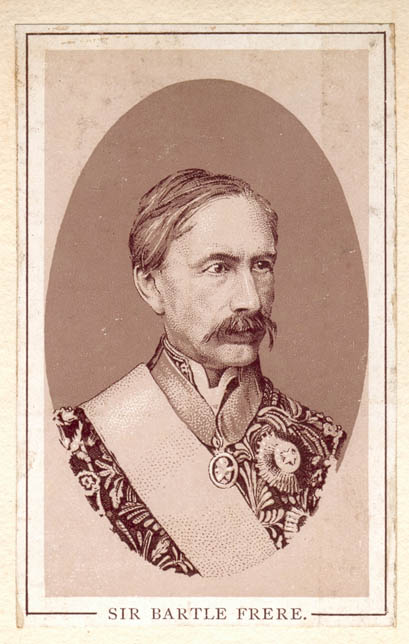
Bartle Frere

Shepstone railed against the disruptive effect of allowing Cetshwayo's regime to remain. "Zulu power", he said, "is the root and real strength of all native difficulties in South Africa". In December 1877, he wrote to Carnarvon "Cetshwayo is the secret hope of every petty independent chief hundreds of miles from him who feels a desire that his colour shall prevail, and it will not be until this hope is destroyed that they will make up their minds to submit to the rule of civilisation". Earlier in October 1877, Shepstone had attended a meeting with Zulu leaders near the Blood River to resolve the land dispute between the Zulus and the Boers. He suggested a compromise with the Boers and the meeting broke up without clear resolutions. He turned against the Zulus with vengeance, saying he had come into possession of "the most incontrovertible, overwhelming and clear evidence" never previously disclosed, for supporting the claims of the Boers. He rejected Zulu claims as "characterised by lying and treachery to an extent that I could not have believed even savages are capable of".

Shepstone, in his capacity as British governor of Natal, had expressed concerns about the Zulu army under King Cetshwayo and the potential threat to Natal – especially given the adoption by some of the Zulus of old muskets and other out-of-date firearms. In his new role of Administrator of the Transvaal, he was now responsible for protecting the Transvaal and had direct involvement in the Zulu border dispute from the side of the Transvaal. Persistent Boer representations and Paul Kruger's diplomatic manoeuvres added to the pressure. There were incidents involving Zulu paramilitary actions on either side of the Transvaal/Natal border, and Shepstone increasingly began to regard King Cetshwayo, as having permitted such "outrages", and to be in a "defiant mood". King Cetshwayo now found no defender in Natal save the bishop of Natal, John Colenso.

Colenso advocated for native Africans in Natal and Zululand who had been unjustly treated by the colonial regime in Natal. In 1874 he took up the cause of Langalibalele and the Hlubi and Ngwe tribes in representations to the Colonial Secretary, Lord Carnarvon. Langalibalele had been falsely accused of rebellion in 1873 and, following a charade of a trial, was found guilty and imprisoned on Robben Island. In taking the side of Langalibalele against the colonial regime in Natal and Theophilus Shepstone, the Secretary for Native Affairs, Colenso found himself even further estranged from colonial society in Natal.

Bishop Colenso's concern about the misleading information that was being provided to the Colonial Secretary in London by Shepstone and the Governor of Natal prompted him to champion the cause of the Zulus against Boer oppression and official encroachments. He was a prominent critic of Frere's efforts to depict the Zulu kingdom as a threat to Natal. Colenso's campaigns revealed the racialist foundation underpinning the colonial regime in Natal and made him enemies among the colonists.

British Prime Minister Benjamin Disraeli's Tory administration in London did not want a war with the Zulus. "The fact is," wrote Sir Michael Hicks Beach, who was to replace Carnarvon as Secretary of State for the Colonies, in November 1878, "that matters in Eastern Europe and India ... wore so serious an aspect that we cannot have a Zulu war in addition to other greater and too possible troubles." However, Sir Bartle Frere had already been into the Cape Colony as governor and High Commissioner since 1877 with the brief of creating a Confederation of South Africa from the various British colonies, Boer Republics and native states and his plans were well advanced. He had concluded that the powerful Zulu kingdom stood in the way of this, and so was receptive to Shepstone's arguments that King Cetshwayo and his Zulu army posed a threat to the peace of the region. Preparations for a British invasion of the Zulu kingdom had been underway for months. In December 1878, notwithstanding the reluctance of the British government to start yet another colonial war, Frere presented Cetshwayo with an ultimatum that the Zulu army be disbanded and the Zulus accept a British resident. This was unacceptable to the Zulus as it effectively meant that Cetshwayo, had he agreed, would have lost his throne.

== Border Tensions ==
=== Border Disputes ===
In 1861, when Mpande was still king but Cetshwayo had become his heir and de facto ruler of the Zulu Kingdom, another son of Mpande, Umtonga, fled to the Utrecht District newly part of the Republic of Transvaal, prompting Cetshwayo to assemble an army on the nearby frontier. According to claims later brought forward by the Boers, Cetshwayo offered the farmers a strip of land along the border if they would surrender his brother. The Boers complied on the condition that Umtonga's life was spared, and in 1861 Mpande signed a deed transferring this land to the Boers. The south boundary of the land added to Utrecht ran from Rorke's Drift on the Buffalo to a point on the Pongola River.

The boundary was beaconed in 1864, but when in 1865 Umtonga again fled from Zululand to Natal, Cetshwayo, seeing that he had lost his part of the bargain (for he feared that the still living Umtonga might be used to supplant him, as Mpande had been used to supplant Dingane), removed the beacon and claimed the land ceded by the Swazis to Lydenburg. The Zulus asserted that the Swazis were their vassals and therefore had no right to part with this territory. For a year, a Boer commando unit, under Paul Kruger and an army under Cetshwayo were posted to defend the newly acquired Utrecht border. The Zulu forces took back their land north of the Pongola. Questions were also raised as to the validity of the documents signed by the Zulus concerning the Utrecht strip; in 1869 the services of the lieutenant-governor of Natal, then Robert William Keate, were accepted by both parties as arbitrator, but the attempt then made to settle disagreements proved unsuccessful.

=== Boundary Commission ===
The tension between Cetshwayo and the Boers in the Transvaal region over the border . Sir Theophilus Shepstone, whom Cetshwayo regarded as his friend, had supported him in the border dispute, but in 1877 he led a small force into the Transvaal and persuaded the Boers to give up their independence. Shepstone became administrator of the Transvaal, and in that role saw the border dispute from the other side. Shepstone claimed to have evidence supporting the Boer position but, ultimately, he failed to provide any. In a meeting with Zulu notables at Blood River in October 1877, Shepstone attempted to placate the Zulu with paternal speeches, however they were unconvinced and accused Shepstone of betraying them. Shepstone's subsequent reports to Carnarvon then began to paint the Zulu as an aggressive threat where he had previously presented Cetshwayo in a most favourable light.

In February 1878 a commission was appointed by Henry Bulwer, the lieutenant-governor of Natal since 1875, to report on the boundary question. The commission reported in July and found almost entirely in favour of the Zulu claims. However, Sir Henry Bartle Frere, then high commissioner and still pressing forward with Carnarvon's federation plan, characterized the award as "one-sided and unfair to the Boers", (Note: Martineau 1895, p. 242 gives much of the chapter, without sarcasm – or irony, to Bartle Frere's remarkable rationalizations in undermining the commission's conclusions.) stipulated that on the land being given to the Zulu, the Boers living on it should be compensated if they left or protected if they remained. In addition, Frere planned to use the meeting on the boundary commission report with the Zulu representatives to also present a surprise ultimatum he had devised that would allow British forces under Lord Chelmsford, which he had previously been instructed to use only in defence against a Zulu invasion of Natal, to instead invade Zululand.

=== Border Incidents ===
Three incidents occurred in late July, August and September which Frere seized upon as his casus belli and were the basis for the ultimatum with which Frere knew Cetshwayo could not comply, giving Frere a pretext to attack the Zulu kingdom. The first two incidents related to the flight into British controlled Natal of two wives of Sihayo kaXongo and their subsequent seizure on two separate occasions and subsequent execution despite being under British protection. The third incident occurred in September when a colonial surveyor and his assistant were detained while on a sandbank of the Tugela River near the Middle Drift.

By themselves, these incidents were flimsy grounds upon which to found an invasion of Zululand.

The original complaint carried to Cetshwayo from the lieutenant-governor was in the form of a request for the surrender of the culprits for trial. Frere wrote to Hicks Beach, 30 September 1878:

Apart from whatever may be the general wish of the Zulu nation, it seems to me that the seizure of the two refugee women in British territory by an armed force crossing an unmistakable and well known boundary line, and carrying them off and murdering them with contemptuous disregard for the remonstrances of the Natal policemen, is itself an insult and a violation of British territory which cannot be passed over, and unless apologised and atoned for by compliance with the Lieutenant Governor's demands, that the leaders of the murderous gangs shall be given up to justice, it will be necessary to send to the Zulu King an ultimatum which must put an end to pacific relations with our neighbours.

In reply, in at least three dispatches, 17 October 21 November and 18 December, Hicks Beach emphatically states that the reinforcements were for defensive purposes, prohibited a British invasion of Zululand and stated that war was to be avoided.

== Ultimatum ==
=== Presenting the Ultimatum ===
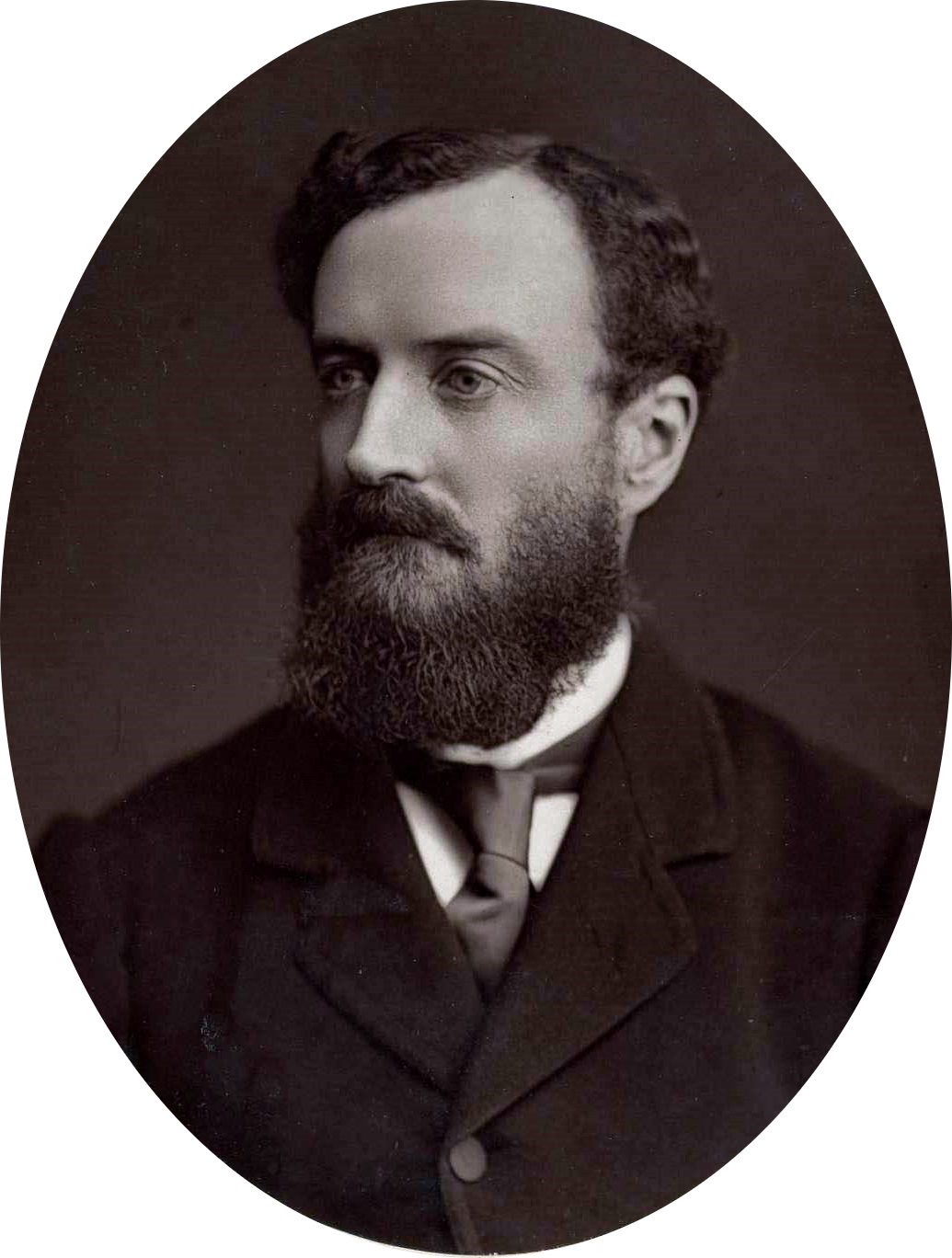
Hicks Beach

After considerable discussion and exchanges of views between Sir Bartle Frere and Sir Henry Ernest Gascoyne Bulwer, it was decided to arrange a meeting with representatives of the Zulu king. The ostensible reason for this indaba was to present the findings of the long-awaited Boundary Commission to the Zulu people. Bartle Frere, without London's approval, would use the occasion to present the king with an ultimatum.

Frere has been accused of chicanery by taking deliberate advantage of the length of time it took for correspondence to pass between South Africa and London to conceal his intentions from his political masters or at least defer giving them the necessary information until it was too late for them to act. The first intimation to the British government of his intention to make 'demands' on the Zulu was in a private letter to Hicks Beach written on 14 October 1878. The letter only arrived in London on 16 November and by then messengers had already been despatched from Natal to the Zulu king to request the presence of a delegation at the Lower Tugela on 11 December for the purpose of receiving the Boundary Commission's findings. Had Hicks Beach then sent off a telegraph forbidding any action other than the announcement of the boundary award, it might have arrived in South Africa just in time to prevent the ultimatum being presented. No prohibition was sent and could hardly be expected to have been, for Hicks Beach had no means of knowing the urgency of the events that were in train. Nowhere in Frere's letter was there anything to indicate how soon he intended to act, nor was there anything to suggest how stringent his demands would be.

In January 1879, Hicks Beach, who had earlier told the Prime Minister that Bartle Frere could not be controlled without a telegraph link, wrote to him saying that previous communications had "not entirely prepared" London for the ultimatum which the Zulus "may not improbably refuse" and stressing "the importance of using every effort to avoid war" and wondering why Frere was"incurring the delay which would have been involved in consulting Her Majesty's Government upon a subject of so much importance".

The terms included in the ultimatum were delivered to the representatives of King Cetshwayo, much to their surprise, on the banks of the Thukela river at the Ultimatum Tree on 11 December 1878.

=== Ultimatum Terms ===
1. Surrender of Sihayo's three sons and brother to be tried by the Natal courts.
2. Payment of a fine of 500 head of cattle for the outrages committed by the above and for Cetshwayo's delay in complying with the request of the Natal Government for the surrender of the offenders.
3. Payment of 100 head of cattle for the offence committed against Messrs. Smith and Deighton.
4. Surrender of the Swazi chief Mbilini waMswati and others to be named hereafter, to be tried by the Transvaal courts.
5. Observance of the coronation promises.
6. That the Zulu army be disbanded and the men allowed to go home.
7. That the Zulu military system be discontinued and other military regulations adopted, to be decided upon after consultation with the Great Council and British Representatives.
8. That every man, when he comes to man's estate, shall be free to marry.
9. All missionaries and their converts, who until 1877 lived in Zululand, shall be allowed to return and reoccupy their stations.
10. All such missionaries shall be allowed to teach and any Zulu, if he chooses, shall be free to listen to their teaching.
11. A British Agent shall be allowed to reside in Zululand, who will see that the above provisions are carried out.
12. All disputes in which a missionary or European is concerned, shall be heard by the king in public and in presence of the Resident.
13. No sentence of expulsion from Zululand shall be carried out until it has been approved by the Resident.

The previous request for the surrender of Sihayo's had been transformed by Sir Bartle Frere into a "demand".

When the ultimatum was presented, the two infractions by Sihayo's sons and the roughing up of Smith and Deighton had become only part of the justification that was used, as several matters had arisen in the meantime.

An addition to the ultimatum, which seems almost like an afterthought, required the surrender of a Swazi chief under Cetshwayo's protection, Mbilini waMswati, who had been actively raiding the Transvaal Boers now under British protection.

=== Reaction to the Ultimatum ===
The ultimatum was relayed by the Zulu representatives to Cetshwayo. No time was specified for compliance with item 4; twenty days were allowed for compliance with items 1–3, that is, until 31 December inclusive; ten days more were allowed for compliance with the remaining demands, items 5–13. The earlier time limits were subsequently altered so that all expired on 10 January 1879.

To ensure that there was no interference from London, Frere delayed informing the Colonial Office about his ultimatum until it was too late for it to be countermanded. The full text of his demands did not reach London until 2 January 1879. By then, Chelmsford had assembled an army of over 17,000 men—redcoats, colonial volunteers and Natal African auxiliaries—along the Zululand border ready for the invasion.

Frere wanted to provoke a conflict with the Zulus and in that goal he succeeded. Cetshwayo rejected the demands by not responding by the end of the year. (Note: Colenso 1880, pp. 261–262 says "the terms...are evidently such as he (Cetshwayo) may not improbably refuse, even at the risk of war...to preclude you from incurring the delay...involved in consulting Her Majesty's Government upon a subject of so much importance as the terms...") A concession was granted by Bartle Frere until 10 January 1879, after which Bartle Frere deemed a state of war to exist. The British forces intended for the defence of Natal had already been on the march with the intention to attack the Zulu kingdom. On 10 January they were poised on the border.

== First invasion ==
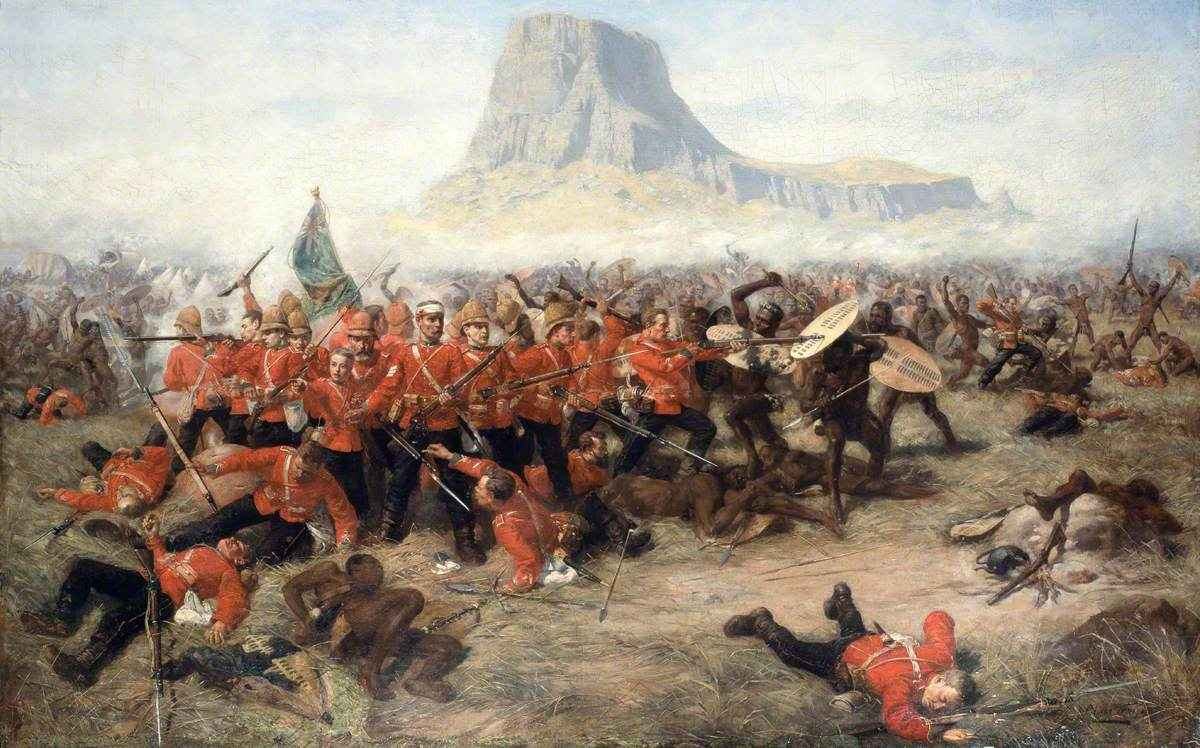
The Last Stand at Isandlwana, painting by Charles Edwin Fripp (1854–1906)

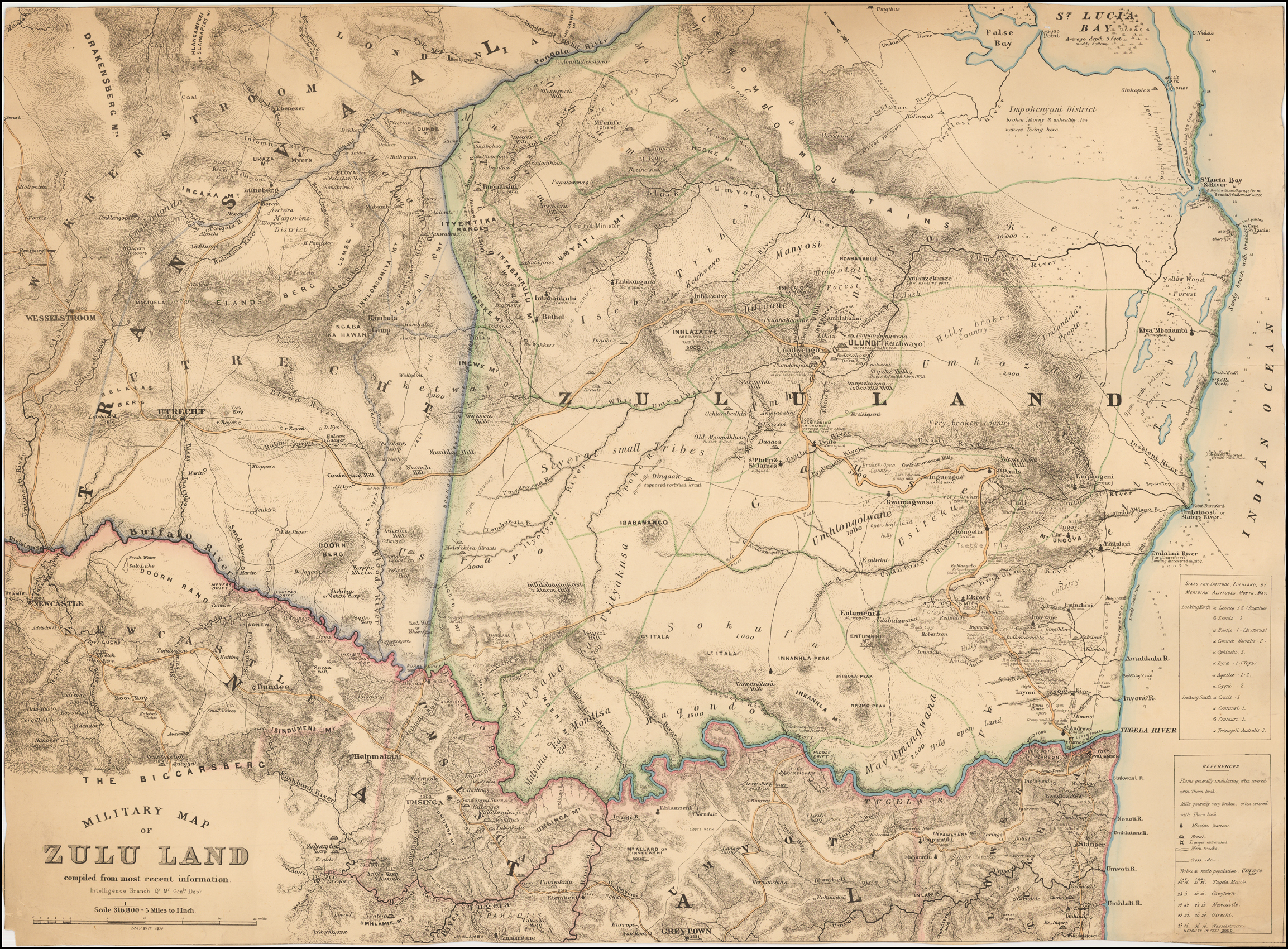
British Army military map of Zulu Land, 1879

The exact date of the invasion was 11 January 1879. Chelmsford crossed the Buffalo River at Rorke's Drift, an old Irish trader's post that had become a mission station, in command of 4,700 men of the No. 3 Column, which included 1,900 White troops and 2,400 African auxiliaries.

Lord Chelmsford, the Commander-in-Chief of British forces during the war, initially planned a five-pronged invasion of Zululand composed of over 17,000 troops in five columns and designed to encircle the Zulu army and force it to fight as he was concerned that the Zulus would avoid battle. The Zulu capital, Ulundi, was about 75 miles inside Zulu territory.

In the event, Chelmsford settled on three invading columns with the main centre column, now consisting of over 8,500 men comprising Colonel Richard Thomas Glyn's No. 3 Column of 4,700 men and Colonel Anthony Durnford's No. 2 Column of over 3,800 men, under his direct command. He moved his troops from Pietermaritzburg to a forward camp at Helpmekaar, past Greytown. On 9 January 1879 they moved to Rorke's Drift, and early on 11 January commenced crossing the Buffalo River into Zululand. Three columns were to invade Zululand, from the Lower Drift of the Tugela River (No. 1 Column under Colonel Charles Pearson), Rorke's Drift (No. 3 Column under Lord Chelmsford), and Utrecht (No. 4 Column under Colonel Evelyn Wood) respectively, their objective being Ulundi, the royal capital. Durnford's No. 2 Column was ordered to stay on the defensive near the Middle Drift of the Tugela River. Meanwhile, No. 5 Column under the command of Colonel Hugh Rowlands would camp at Luneville in the Transvaal, to guard against possible intervention either by the Pedi tribe under Sekhukhune–a known ally of Cetshwayo–or by the Boers.

While Cetshwayo's army numbered perhaps 35,000–60,000 men, it was essentially a militia force which could be called out in time of national danger. (Note: Knight 1996, p. 11 states "they were a part-time citizen army, and were armed primarily with traditional weapons".) It had a very limited logistical capacity and could only stay in the field a few weeks before the troops would be obliged to return to their civilian duties. Zulu warriors were armed primarily with Assegai thrusting spears, known in Zulu as iklwa, clubs, some throwing spears and shields made of cowhide. (Note: Archer et al. 2008, p. 462 state "They had a national army of twenty-five thousand men equipped with cowhide shields, assegais and clubs.)

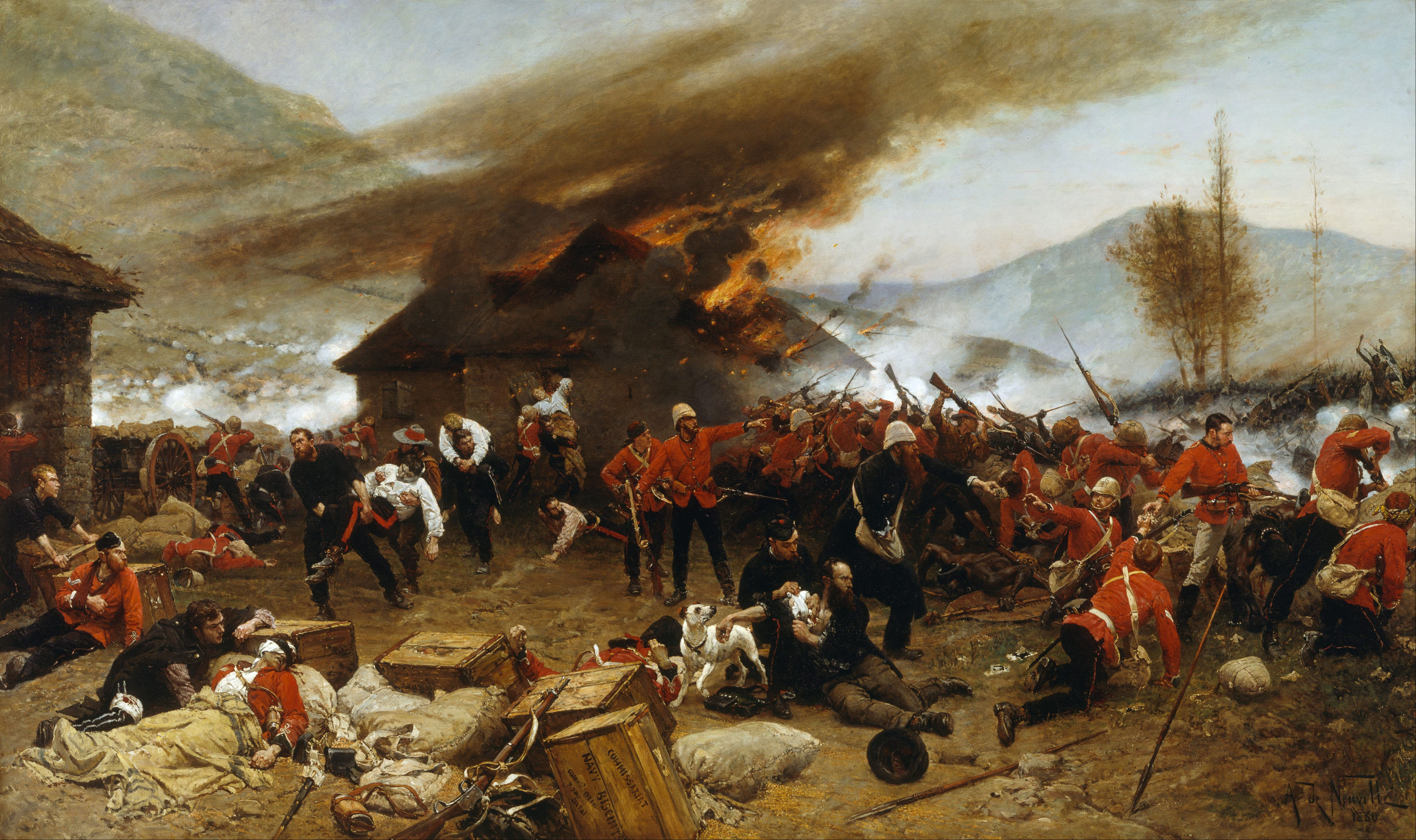
The Battle of Rorke's Drift by Alphonse de Neuville. The British defense of the small hospital station was a morale boost for the British Empire.

The initial entry of all three columns was unopposed. On 22 January the centre column, which had advanced from Rorke's Drift, was encamped near Isandlwana; on the morning of that day Lord Chelmsford split his forces and moved out to support a reconnoitring party, leaving the remaining 1,300 men of the No. 3 Column under the command of Colonel Pulleine. Colonel Durnford would arrive later in the morning with 500 men of the No. 2 Column to reinforce the camp. The British were outmanoeuvred by the main Zulu army nearly 20,000 strong led by Ntshingwayo Khoza. Chelmsford was lured eastward with much of his centre column by a Zulu diversionary force while the main Impi attacked his camp. Chelmsford's decision not to set up the British camp defensively, contrary to established doctrine, and ignoring information that the Zulus were close at hand were decisions that the British were soon to regret. The ensuing Battle of Isandlwana was the greatest victory that the Zulu kingdom would enjoy during the war. The British centre column was wrecked and its camp annihilated with heavy casualties as well as the loss of all its supplies, ammunition and transport. The defeat left Chelmsford no choice but to hastily retreat out of Zululand. In the battle's aftermath, a party of some 4,000 Zulu reserves mounted an unauthorised raid on the nearby British Army border post of Rorke's Drift and were driven off after 10 hours of ferocious fighting on 23 January.

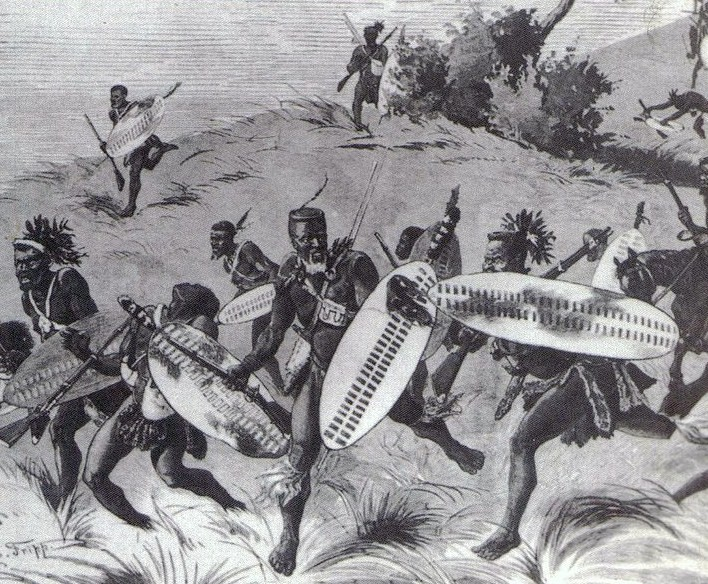
Zulu warriors, 1879 (Charles Edwin Fripp)

While the British central column under Chelmsford's command was thus engaged, the right flank column on the coast, under Colonel Charles Pearson, crossed the Tugela River, skirmished with a Zulu impi that was attempting to set up an ambush at the Inyezane River, and advanced as far as the deserted missionary station of Eshowe, which he set about fortifying. On learning of the disaster at Isandlwana, Pearson made plans to withdraw back beyond the Tugela River. However, before he had decided whether or not to put these plans into effect, the Zulu army managed to cut off his supply lines, and the Siege of Eshowe had begun.

Meanwhile, the left flank column at Utrecht, under Colonel Evelyn Wood, had originally been charged with occupying the Zulu tribes of north-west Zululand and preventing them from interfering with the British central column's advance on Ulundi. To this end Wood set up camp at Tinta's Kraal, just 10 miles south of Hlobane Mountain, where a force of 4,000 Zulus had been spotted. He planned to attack them on 24 January, but on learning of the disaster at Isandlwana, he decided to withdraw back to the Kraal. Thus one month after the British invasion, only their left flank column remained militarily effective, and it was too weak to conduct a campaign alone. The first invasion of Zululand had been a failure. (Note: Laband 2009, p. 5 "The Anglo-Zulu War is described in terms of the 1st invasion and 2nd invasion.")

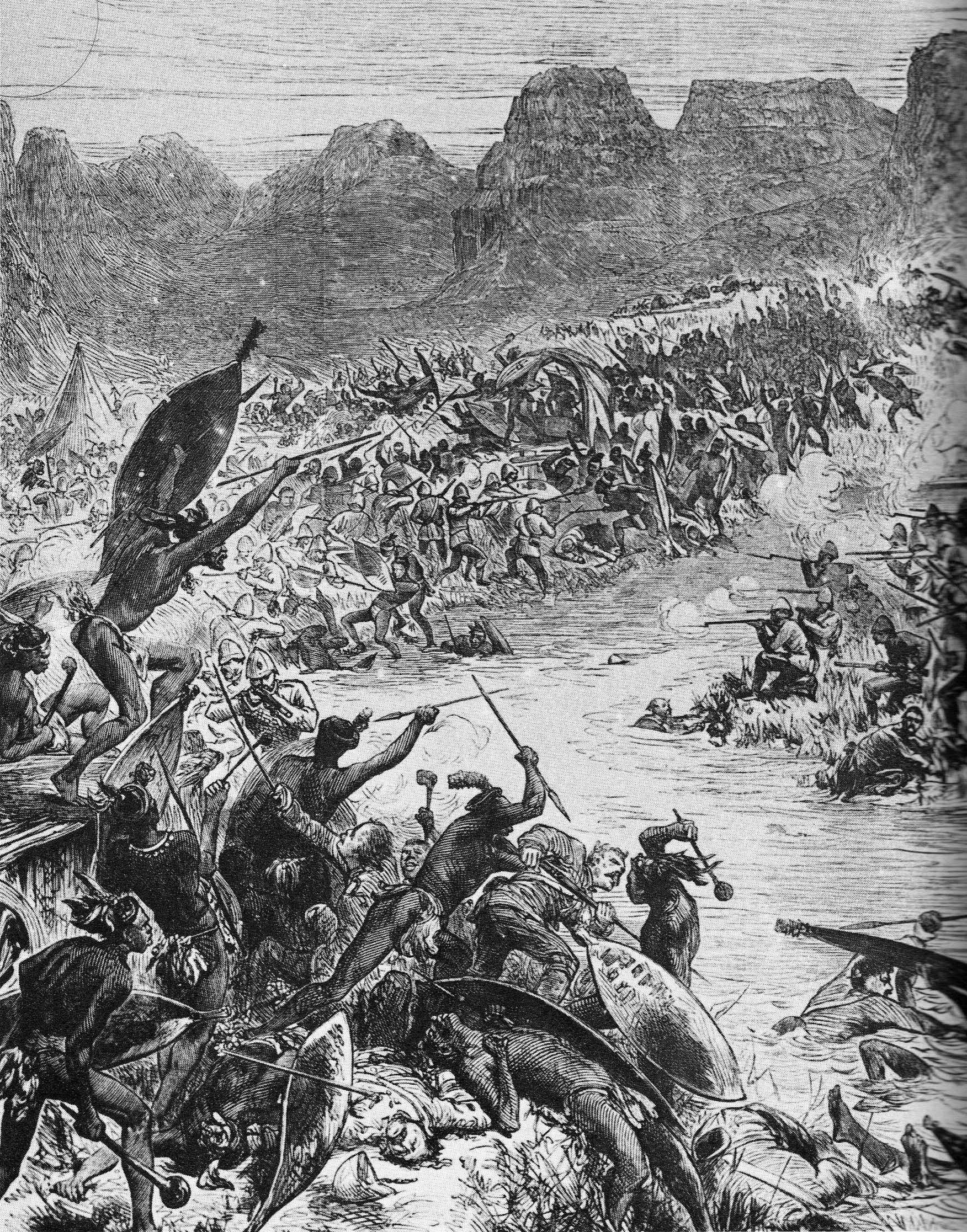
Battle of the Intombe river

It had never been Cetshwayo's intention to invade Natal, but to simply fight within the boundaries of the Zulu kingdom. Chelmsford used the next two months to regroup and build a fresh invading force with the initial intention of relieving Pearson at Eshowe. The British government rushed seven regiments of reinforcements to Natal, along with two artillery batteries.

On 12 March, an armed escort of stores marching to Luneberg, was defeated by about 500 Zulus at the Battle of Intombe; the British force suffered 80 killed (Note: Morris 1965, p. 474 gives 80 killed: 2 Officers, 60 NCOs and other ranks, 3 European conductors and 15 native voorloopers.) and all the stores were lost. The first troops arrived at Durban on 7 March. On the 29th a column under Lord Chelmsford consisting of a total of 5,670 men (3,390 Europeans and 2,280 Africans) marched to the relief of Eshowe, with entrenched camps being formed each night.

Chelmsford ordered Sir Evelyn Wood's troops to attack the abaQulusi Zulu stronghold in Hlobane. Lieutenant Colonel Redvers Buller, led the attack on Hlobane on 28 March. However, as the Zulu main army of 20,000 men approached to help their besieged tribesmen, the British force began a retreat which turned into a rout and were pursued by 1,000 Zulus of the abaQulusi who inflicted some 225 casualties on the British force.

The next day 20,000 Zulu warriors (Note: Colenso 1880, p. 353 notes "The strength of the enemy was thought to be 20,000 of whom 1000 are supposed to have been killed.".) attacked Wood's 2,068 men in a well-fortified camp at Kambula, apparently without Cetshwayo's permission. The British held them off in the Battle of Kambula and after five hours of heavy attacks the Zulus withdrew with heavy losses but were pursued by British mounted troops, who killed many more fleeing and wounded warriors. British losses amounted to 83 (28 killed and 55 wounded), while the Zulus lost up to 2,000 killed. (Note: Raugh 2011, p. 5, gives 800 Zulu casualties. Knight 1995, p. 142 says, '785 [bodies] were collected from close by the camp. Many more lay out on the line of retreat where the slaughter had been heaviest... Perhaps as many as 2,000 died'.) The effect of the battle of Kambula on the Zulu army was severe. Their commander Mnyamana Buthelezi tried to get the regiments to return to Ulundi but many demoralised warriors simply went home.

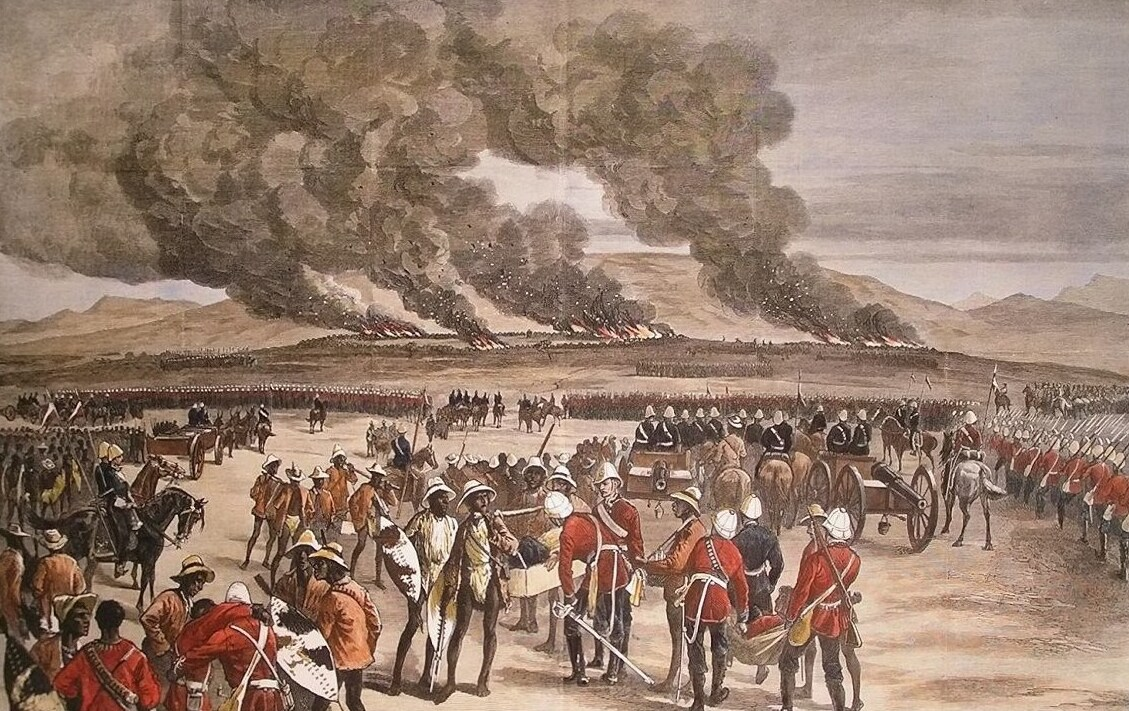
The burning of Ulundi

While Woods was thus engaged, Chelmsford's column was marching on Eshowe. On 2 April this force was attacked en route at Gingindlovu, the Zulu being repulsed. Their losses were heavy, estimated at 1,200, but the British suffered only two dead and 52 wounded and the next day they relieved Pearson's men. They evacuated Eshowe on 5 April after which the Zulu forces burned it down.

== Second invasion ==
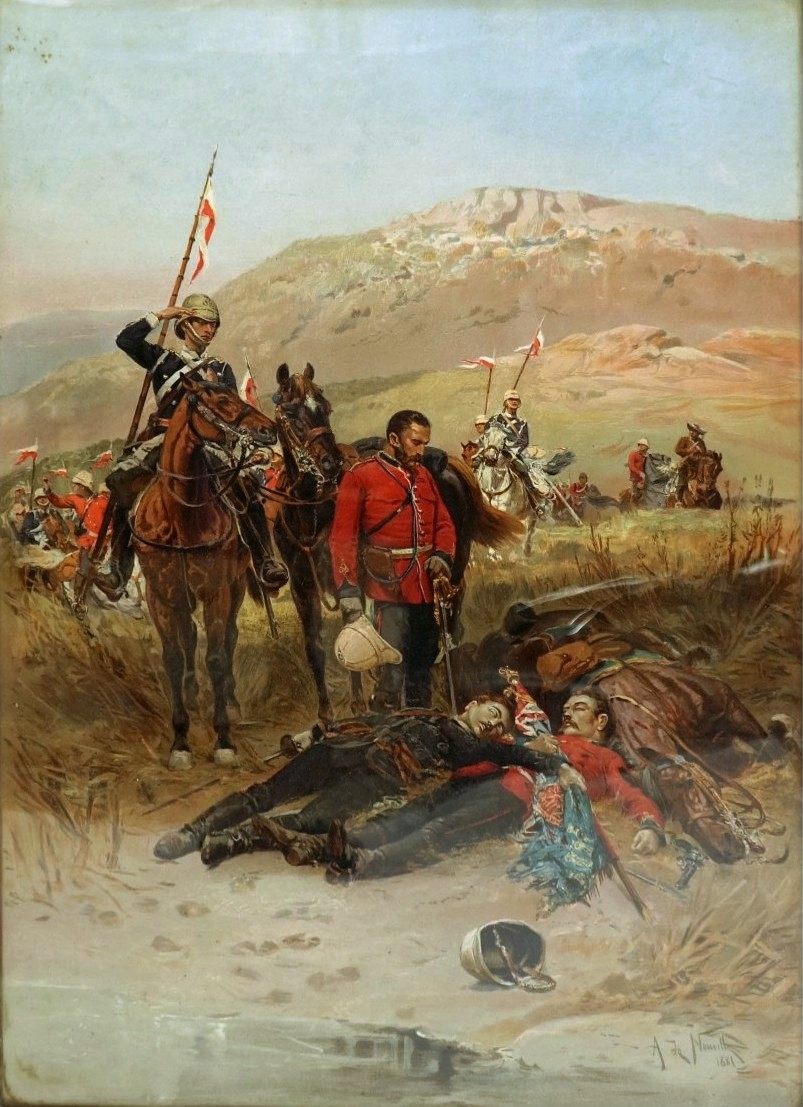
Last Sleep of the Brave, 1879 (Alphonse de Neuville)

The new start of the larger, heavily reinforced second invasion (Note: Raugh 2011, p. 5 "Chelmsford...began his second invasion". Thompson 2006, p. 75 "Thus ended the first British invasion of Zululand". Knight 2003, p. 27 has a map titled: "First invasion of Zululand". Morris 1965, pp. 498–510 has a chapter titled: "The Second Invasion".) was not promising for the British. Despite their successes at Kambula, Gingindlovu and Eshowe, they were right back where they had started from at the beginning of January. Nevertheless, Chelmsford had a pressing reason to proceed with haste – Sir Garnet Wolseley was being sent to replace him, and he wanted to inflict a decisive defeat on Cetshwayo's forces before then. With yet more reinforcements arriving, soon to total 17,000 British and 7,000 Native troops, Chelmsford reorganised his forces and again advanced into Zululand in June, this time with extreme caution building fortified camps all along the way to prevent any repeat of Isandlwana.

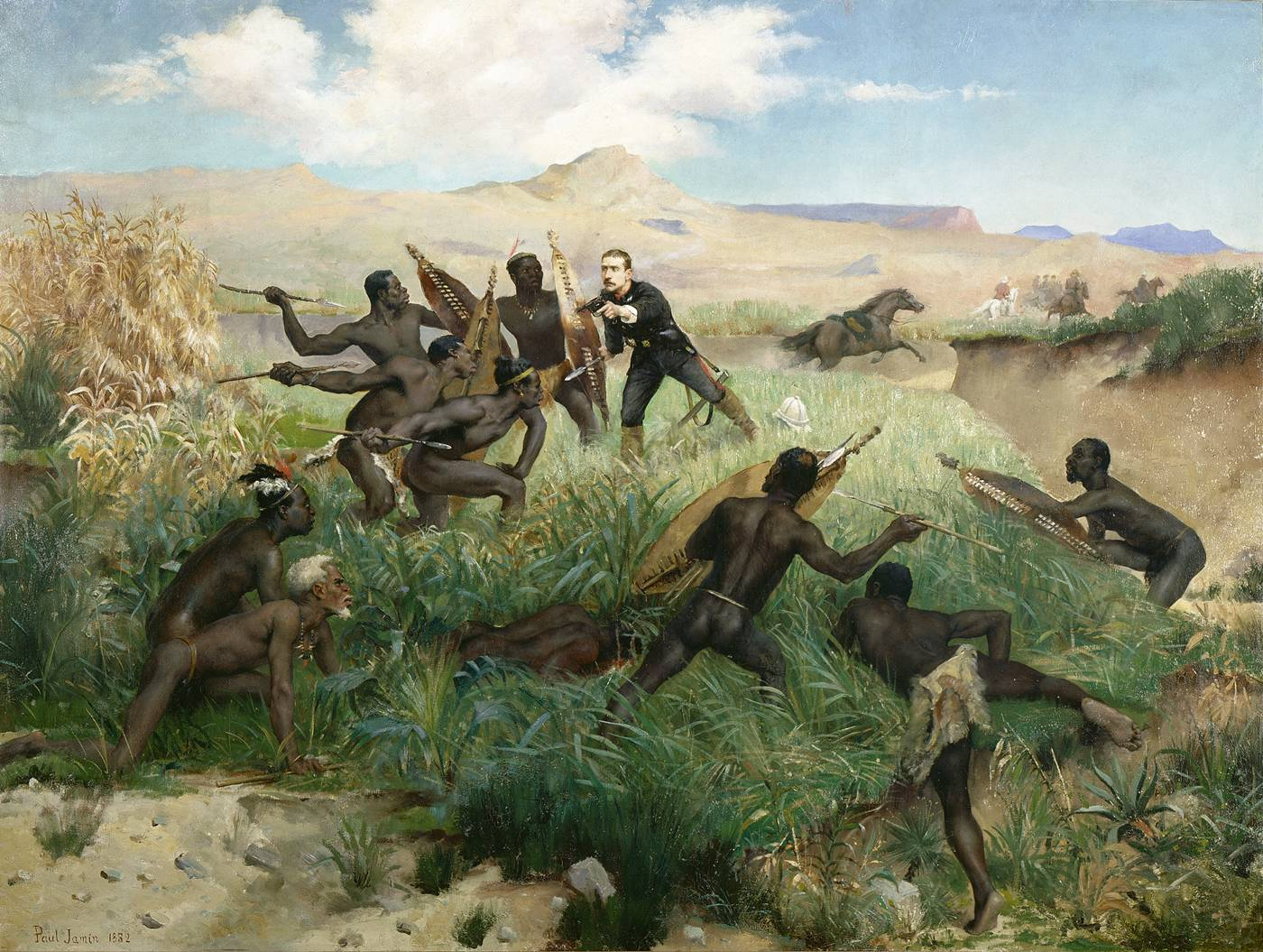
The Death of the Prince Imperial by Paul Jamin, 1882

One of the early British casualties was the exiled pretender to the French throne, Prince Imperial Eugene Bonaparte, who had volunteered to serve in the British Army and was killed on 1 June while out with a reconnoitring party.

Cetshwayo, knowing that the newly reinforced British would be a formidable opponent, attempted to negotiate a peace treaty. Chelmsford was not open to negotiations, as he wished to restore his reputation before Wolseley relieved him of command, and he proceeded to the royal kraal of Ulundi, intending to defeat the main Zulu army. On 4 July, the armies clashed at the Battle of Ulundi, and Cetshwayo's forces were decisively defeated.

== Aftermath ==
After the battle of Ulundi, the Zulu army dispersed, most of the leading chiefs tendered their submission, and Cetshwayo became a fugitive. Wolseley, having relieved Chelmsford after Ulundi, took over the final operations and on 28 August captured and eventually deposed the king. Wolseley wasted no time in discarding Bartle Frere's confederation scheme and drew up a new scheme which divided Zululand into thirteen chiefdoms headed by compliant chiefs which ensured that the Zulus would no longer unite under a single king and made internal divisions and civil wars inevitable. The dynasty of Shaka was deposed, and the Zulu country portioned among eleven Zulu chiefs, including Zibhebhu, and two non Zulus John Robert Dunn, a white adventurer, and Hlubi, a Basuto chief allied to the British in the war.

Chelmsford received a Knight Grand Cross of Bath, largely because of Ulundi. However, he was severely criticized by the Horse Guards investigation and would never serve in the field again. Bartle Frere was relegated to a minor post in Cape Town.

A Resident (Melmoth Osborn) was appointed to be the channel of communication between the chiefs and the British government. This arrangement led to much bloodshed and disturbance, and in 1882 the British government determined to restore Cetshwayo to power. In the meantime, however, blood feuds had been engendered between the chiefs Usibepu (Zibebu) and Hamu on the one side and the tribes who supported the ex-king and his family on the other. Cetshwayo's party (who now became known as the Usuthu) suffered severely at the hands of the two chiefs, who were aided by a band of white freebooters.

When Cetshwayo was restored Usibepu was left in possession of his territory, while Dunn's land and that of the Basuto chief (the country between the Tugela River and the Umhlatuzi, i.e., adjoining Natal) was constituted a reserve, in which locations were to be provided for Zulu unwilling to serve the restored king. This new arrangement proved as futile as had Wolseley's. Usibepu, having created a formidable force of well-armed and trained warriors, and being left in independence on the borders of Cetshwayo's territory, viewed with displeasure the re-installation of his former king, and Cetshwayo was desirous of humbling his relative. A collision very soon took place; Usibepu's forces were victorious, and on 22 July 1883, led by a troop of mounted Boer mercenary troops, he made a sudden descent upon Cetshwayo's kraal at Ulundi, which he destroyed, massacring such of the inmates of both sexes as could not save themselves by flight. The king escaped, though wounded, into Nkandla forest. After appeals to Melmoth Osborn he moved to Eshowe, where he died soon after.

Because of the unusually high amount of casualties the British suffered as a result of combat and the massive early defeats, especially given that they were facing a preindustrial enemy, the British war effort was widely seen as a poor showing. British casualties resulting from combat were three times higher than those from disease, which was generally a larger killer in British colonial conflicts.

Together with famines, diplomatic misadventures, and other unpopular wars overseas (such as the Second Anglo-Afghan War), it contributed to the ejection of Benjamin Disraeli's government from office in 1880, after only one term.

== Last veterans ==
- Colour Sergeant (later Lieutenant-Colonel and OBE) Frank Bourne, DCM (1854–1945) Last survivor of Rorke's Drift.
- Private Charles Wallace Warden (died 8 March 1953)
- Henry "Harry" Figg R.N. (died 23 May 1953)

== Film depictions ==
- Zulu (1964), depicts the Battle of Rorke's Drift.
- Zulu Dawn (1979), depicts the Battle of Isandlwana.
- Monty Python's The Meaning of Life (1983) – one of the chapters depicts a British officer trying to shave during the Battle of Rorke's Drift.

== See also ==
- Bambatha Rebellion
- Colony of Natal
- First Boer War
- Military history of South Africa
- Shaka Zulu
- Scramble for Africa
- Kingdom of Zululand
