= Lüneburg, KwaZulu-Natal =

Lüneburg
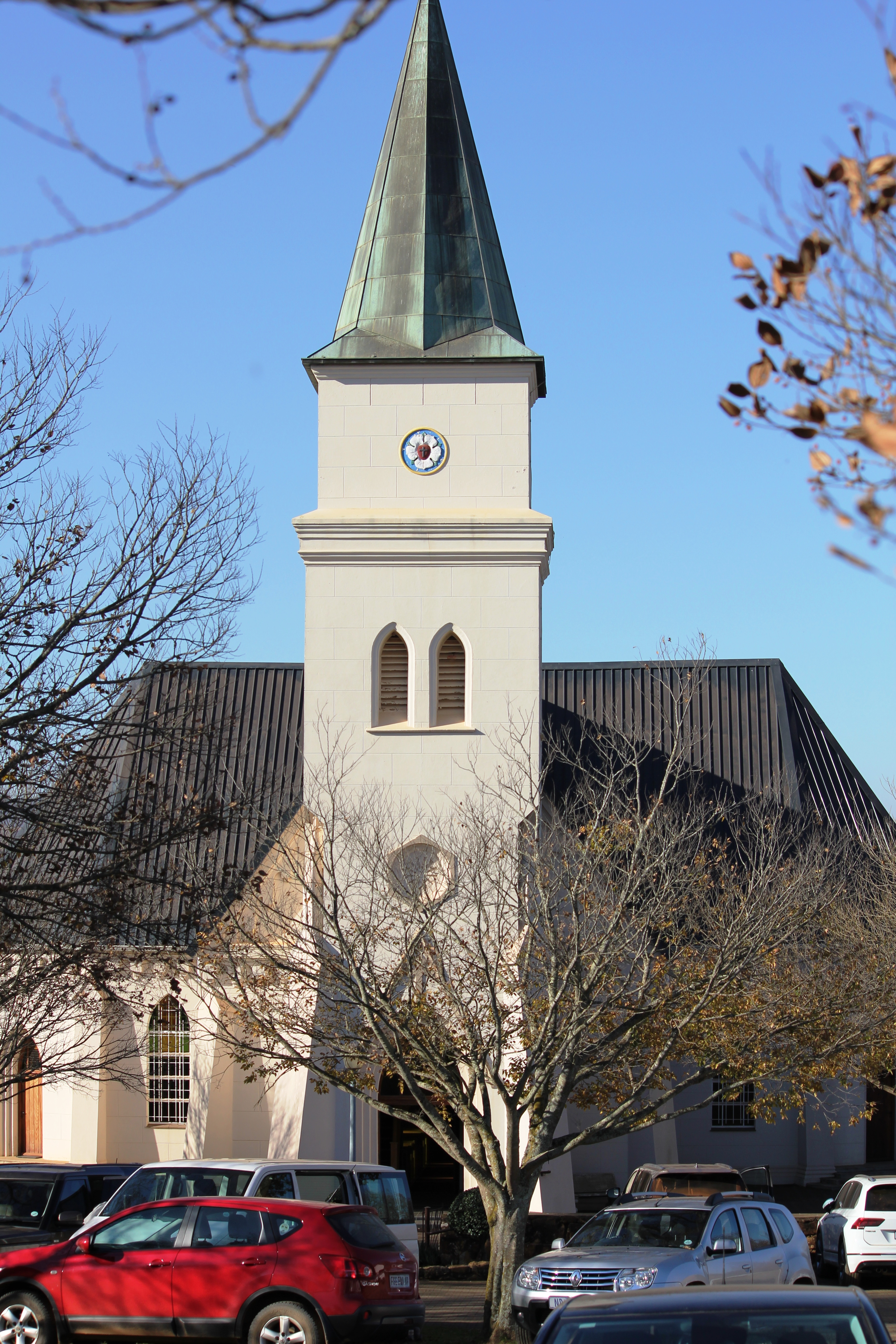
- St Peter-Paul's Church

- Location within KwaZulu-Natal Location within South Africa
- Coordinates: 27.314°S 30.619°E
- Country: South Africa
- Province: KwaZulu-Natal
- District: Zululand
- Municipality: eDumbe

Government
  - Type: Ward 1
  - Councillor: E.S Thela
- Time zone: UTC+2 (SAST)
- PO box: 3183

Lüneburg is a farming community in eDumbe Local Municipality in the KwaZulu-Natal province of South Africa.

Originally settled by German Lutheran missionaries, it was probably named after the town of Lüneburg in Germany. It is the site of the oldest German school in northern KwaZulu-Natal, and is located on the border with Mpumalanga.

Station of the Hermannsburg Mission Society just south of the Transvaal border, some 17 km north-west of Paulpietersburg. Established in 1854, it was named after Lüneburg in Germany.

== Missionary society ==
The first German immigrants arrived on August 2, 1854 in Port Natal on the missionary ship Candace. In 1860, August Hardeland, superintendent of the Hermannsburg Mission, obtained permission from the Zulu king Mpande kaSenzangakhona to establish three missionary stations. These stations, named eNtombe, eMhlongamvula, and eNcaka, form the nucleus of what is now Lüneberg. The missionaries brought artisans, but the money from the society ran out and they needed to make their own income. The settlers thus obtained a concession from the South African Republic (Transvaal) government to harvest and sell lumber from the local dense forests. With the resulting income, settlers could then buy farms and grow crops.

=== First pastor and church building ===
Heinrich Meyer's two-year-old son, who drowned in November 1869, was the first to be buried in the cemetery. Jakob Filter, who buried the boy, was ordained the first pastor and built a sod church next door to the graveyard, along with a school a year later. The school was mainly used for religious instruction, but also taught arithmetic and reading and was the first schoolhouse in the southeastern ZAR (or northern Natal). The settlers named the town after the hometown of many of them. The Rev. Filter considered the Zulus pagan, tyrannical, and barbarous, and advocated their conquest by the British.

== British incursions ==
From 1875 on, attacks against nearby farms increased, killing several baptized Zulu. The German settlers therefore built a low wall around the church, with a moat watered by an irrigation ditch. Settlers retreated there when necessary, but the ZAR was too preoccupied to help.

In 1877, the ZAR was annexed by British forces, and the Germans gained the protection of the British authorities. Colonel Evelyn Wood was deployed to the area with the 90th Regiment of Foot. He would settle in Fort Clery in 1878, 9 km from the battlefield in eNtombe. It never garrisoned troops in warfare but was used among other purposes as an ammunition depot.

== Anglo-Zulu War ==
During the Anglo-Zulu War in 1879, 120 citizens of all ages were trapped in the church fortress. In February and March, a British column marched from Lydenburg to Lüneberg, stalled by a flooded river on March 11 at the eNtombe ford. The next morning they were overrun by the Zulus, who also chased off a smaller British force on the southern side of the river. 62 British infantry and 17 cavalry lost their lives. Most were buried in mass graves, but Captain Moriarty and several officers were buried in the Lüneberg cemetery. The Rev. Filter's son and a Mr. Larson were executed by the Zulu as British scouts, and a monument to them still stands. A border commission awarded the area to Transvaal later that year, after years of Zulu Kingdom claims to the area.

== Later history ==
During the Second Boer War, Fort Clery was destroyed to prevent its use by British force. The first school was demolished as well, though the stables were converted into a new one in 1902 that later expanded. The school's current building dates to 1966, and in 2007, there were around 80 students in the boarding school, which teaches primarily in German.
