= Karin Söderström =

Swedish sailor (born 1985)

Karin Johanna Söderström (born 28 January 1985) is a Swedish Olympic sailor. She finished 14th in the Laser Radial event at the 2008 Summer Olympics.
