= Paige Railey =

American sailor (born 1987)

Medal record

Sailing

Representing United States

ILCA 6 World Championships
Gold medal – first place	2005 Fortaleza	Women's Laser Radial
Bronze medal – third place	2010 Largs	Women's Laser Radial
Bronze medal – third place	2011 Perth	Women's Laser Radial
Bronze medal – third place	2013 Rizhao	Women's Laser Radial

Youth Sailing World Championships - Female Singhander
Gold medal – first place	2005	Girl's Laser Radial
Gold medal – first place	2003	Girl's Laser Radial
Bronze medal – third place	2002	Girl's Byte

Pan American Games
Gold medal – first place	2007 Rio	Women's Laser Radial
Gold medal – first place	2015 Toronto	Women's Laser Radial
Bronze medal – third place	2011 Guadalajara	Women's Laser Radial

Paige Railey (born May 15, 1987, in Clearwater, Florida) is an American sailor who races in the Laser Radial division. She has been a member of U.S. Sailing Team since 2005 and is also a member of the Harken and McLube Speedteam. She was awarded in 2006 the ISAF World Sailor of the Year Award and the U.S. Sailing's Rolex Yachtswoman of the Year.

She nearly qualified for the 2008 Beijing Olympics but was edged out by eventual gold-medal winner Anna Tunnicliffe at the U.S. Olympic Trials. Paige competed in the 2012 Olympic Games in London, the 2016 Olympic Games in Rio de Janeiro, and the 2020 Olympic Games in Tokyo.

== Life ==
Railey was raised in Clearwater, Florida and is an alumna of the University of South Florida in Tampa. Her older brother Zack Railey is an American sailor and silver medalist.
