= Ernest Grandier =

French soldier

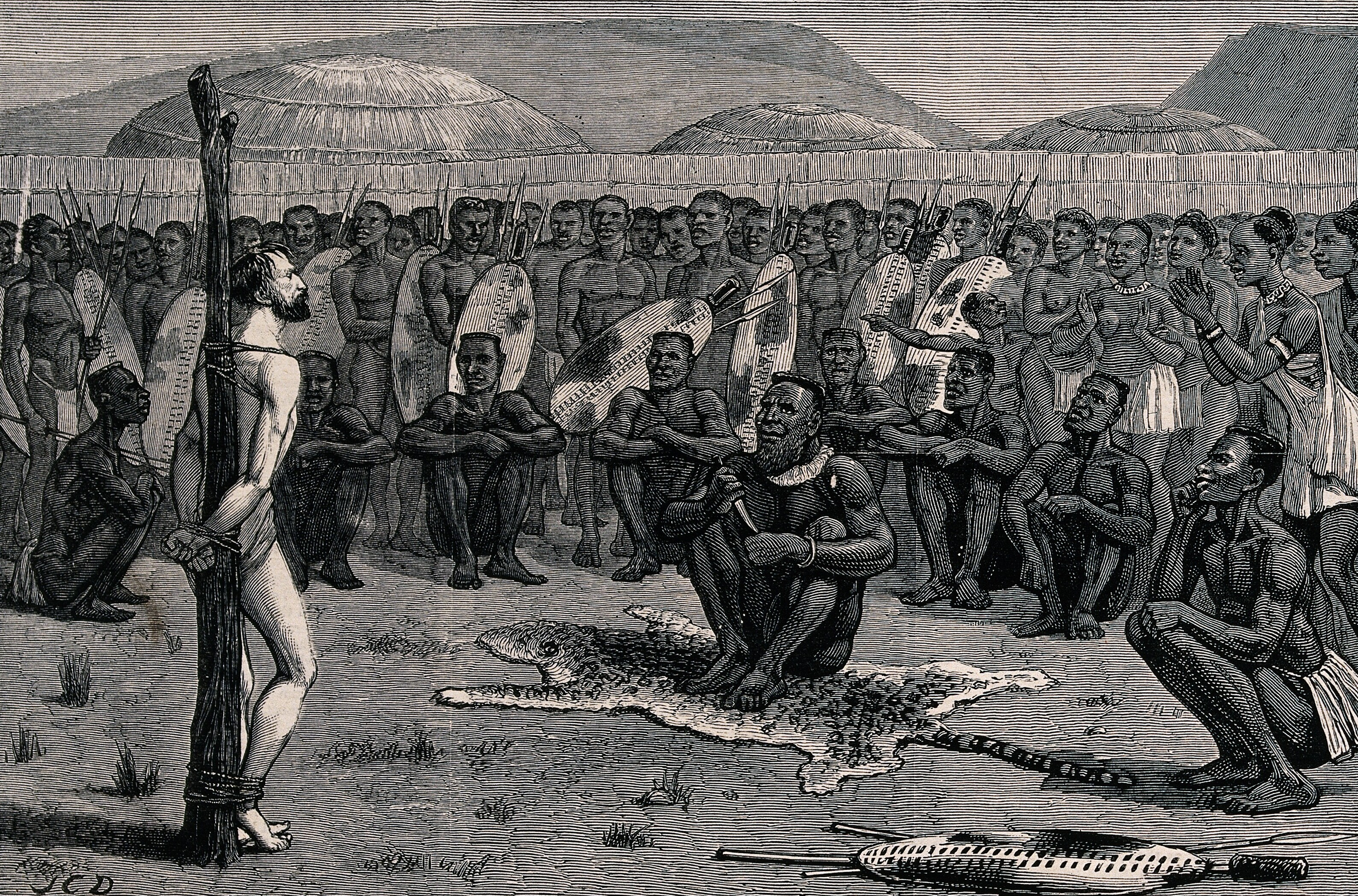
- Contemporary British engraving of Grandier brought before Cetshwayo
- Born: Bordeaux, France
- Military career
- Allegiance: British
- Service years: 1879
- Rank: Trooper
- Unit: Weatherley's Border Horse
- Conflicts: Battle of Hlobane

Ernest Grandier was a French soldier in British service during the Anglo-Zulu War. Born in France, he moved to southern Africa and by the start of 1879 he had enlisted in Weatherley's Border Horse. He served in the Anglo-Zulu War on the British side and was captured by the Zulu at the Battle of Hlobane. According to Grandier's account he was mistreated by the Zulu before escaping back to British lines and this story featured in sensationalist press reports. However, Grandier's account was doubted by contemporary writer Bertram Mitford and modern historian Ian Knight considers that Gandier was treated well and then released by the Zulu king Cetshwayo as a gesture towards peace with the British. Grandier was the only white prisoner of war taken by the Zulu during the war. By 1884 he was an innkeeper near to Kimberley Mine; details of his later life are not known.

== Early life and capture ==
Grandier was born in Bordeaux, France, and worked as a stone cutter before emigrating to southern Africa. By the start of the Anglo-Zulu War in January 1879, when he was in his late 20s, he had joined Weatherley's Border Horse, an irregular mounted unit in British service, as a trooper. Weatherley's Border Horse were formed at Pretoria in the South African Republic in November 1878 by Frederick Augustus Weatherley. One of the unit's two troops (numbering 61 men) joined Colonel Evelyn Wood's invasion column and arrived at his camp at Kambula on 2 March.

Weatherley led 52 men of his unit into action at the 28 March Battle of Hlobane, the force was outflanked by the Zulu and forced to withdraw with the loss of Weatherley and 43 others killed. By Grandier's account he dismounted during the withdrawal to place a comrade on his horse and was running alongside when he was tackled by a Zulu and taken prisoner. Zulu War historian Ian Knight considers it more likely that he was captured after becoming separated from his unit and attempting to sneak away to safety. The statements of Zulu veterans, interviewed in the 1930s, agree with this version of the story, noting that Grandier was found some time after the battle, hiding among rocks.

== Prisoner of the Zulu ==
After his capture Grandier said he was taken to the nearby kraal of the Zulu-allied renegade Swazi prince Mbilini waMswati and questioned by him as to the whereabouts of British South African political leader Theophilus Shepstone and the identity of the British military leader of the Hlobane expedition. Grandier said he was tied to a tree overnight and the next day taken out and shown to a Zulu impi who threatened to kill him. He was saved by a Zulu inkosi named Manyanyana and ordered to be taken to King Cetshwayo at Ulundi. Grandier was taken back to Hlobane and the following day sent on foot, under guard by four warriors to the Zulu capital. Grandier recalled that he was stripped naked for the journey and made to carry the food for the party.

On arrival at Ulundi Grandier was interrogated by Cetshwayo who wanted to know the whereabouts of Shepstone who the Zulu thought was leading Wood's column as it had originated from the South African Republic. Grandier was also questioned on the location of the Zulu prince uHamu kaNzibe, who had defected to the British, and shown the two artillery pieces captured by the Zulu at the 22 January Battle of Isandlwana and asked if he could operate them. When he proved of little use he was confined to a hut.

Grandier afterwards claimed he was mistreated by being beaten and fed only on a diet of mealie corn. When word reached Ulundi of Mbilini's 5 April death in a skirmish with the British, Grandier said that Cetshwayo ordered him sent to Mbilini's men for execution. He said he was dispatched on 13 April under the guard of two Zulu who he overpowered later that day, killing one. Grandier said he travelled the next three nights (resting during the day) towards British lines. He was found by a British patrol near the Zungwini Mountain on 16 April, brought to Wood's camp at Kambula and revived with medicinal brandy. The survivors of Grandier's unit had also returned to Kambula after the defeat at Hlobane and fought in the 29 March defence of the camp (suffering no casualties) before returning to Pretoria.

== Reporting and later life ==
Grandier's story was subject to sensational reporting in the British and Natal Colony press. He was the only white prisoner of war captured by the Zulu in the conflict. By 1884 he was an innkeeper near the Kimberley Mine and regaled the travel writer J.W. Matthews with an account of his time as a prisoner of the Zulu; nothing is known of his later life.

At the time of the initial reporting, the writer Bertram Mitford expressed doubts over the story of Grandier's escape, stating that it was improbable that he could have covered 50 miles (80 km) from Ulundi to Zungwini without discovery as the surviving guard would have quickly raised the alarm. The Dutch trader Cornelius Vijn, who had lived with and was familiar with the court of Cetshwayo, heard that Grandier had been well treated as a prisoner, supplied with rum, gin and tobacco and protected by the king. Vijn thought that Grandier had been released near to where he had been captured when it was found he possessed no useful information. Shortly after the war, a journalist for the Natal Mercury interviewed Mnyamana kaNgqenelele Buthelezi, the most senior advisor to Cetshwayo and presumably the "Manyanyana" that Grandier recalled saving his life. Mnyamana told him that Grandier had been purposely released near to British lines. Knight considers that Grandier was released by Cetshwayo as a gesture of his commitment to securing a peace treaty to end the war.
