= Usuthu, KwaZulu-Natal =

Usuthu or oSuthu is a main place in Nongoma Local Municipality in KwaZulu-Natal province of South Africa, with 2001 and 2011 Census number: 53004000.

Usuthu was founded in 1898 as a homestead by Dinuzulu kaCetshwayo (Dinizulu) son of King Cetshwayo. He chose the name in homage to his father's followers who were called uSuthu. At the time he was employed by the British as an advisor, although he was widely regarded by the Zulu people as their king.
