= Nongoma =

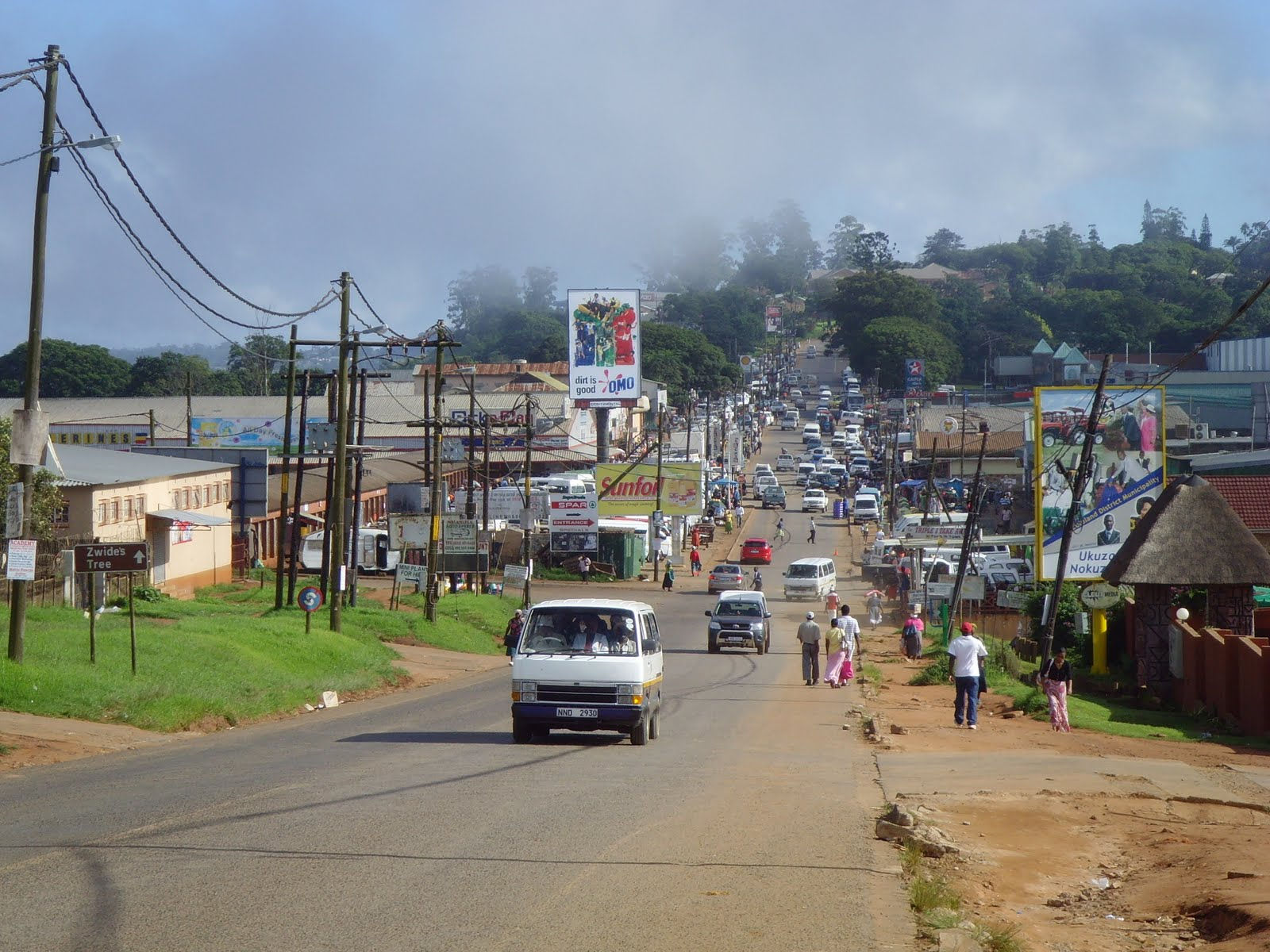
- Street in Nongoma

- Location within KwaZulu-Natal Location within South Africa
- Coordinates: 27°53′S 31°38′E
- Country: South Africa
- Province: KwaZulu-Natal
- District: Zululand
- Municipality: Nongoma

Area
  - Total: 8.50 km^{2} (3.28 sq mi)
- Elevation: 802 m (2,631 ft)

Population (2011)
  - Total: 7,629
  - Density: 898/km^{2} (2,320/sq mi)

Racial makeup (2011)
  - Black African: 97.0%
  - Coloured: 0.8%
  - Indian/Asian: 0.7%
  - White: 0.9%
  - Other: 0.6%

First languages (2011)
  - Zulu: 92.7%
  - English: 2.3%
  - S. Ndebele: 1.2%
  - Other: 3.8%
- Time zone: UTC+2 (SAST)
- PO box: 3950
- Area code: 035

Nongoma is a town in Zululand, KwaZulu-Natal, South Africa. It is the seat of the Nongoma Local Municipality. It is situated 300 km north of Durban and 56 km from Ulundi; it is surrounded by the Ngome Forest. It is a busy market town that serves a large surrounding area. It is assigned registration plate NND (Natal NDwandwe).

This small town is also the home of King Bhekuzulu College, one of the popular boarding schools in the province. There are also TVET College, Mthashana TVET College Nongoma and KwaGqikazi Campuses.

== Royal palaces (Izigodlo) ==
The area has six royal palaces belonging to the late Zulu King Goodwill Zwelithini:

- Osuthu Royal Palace - The King lived here.
- Khethomthandayo Royal Palace — His first wife, Queen MaDlamini, lives here.
- KwaDlamahlahla Royal Palace — Queen KaMathe lives here.
- Kwakhangelamankengane Royal Palace — Queen Mother Mantfombi kaSobhuza II -Zulu lives here.
- Linduzulu Royal Palace — Queen MaNdlovu, lives here.
- Enyokeni Royal Palace — Queen MaMchiza lives here, and it is the King's only 'traditional' palace. In early September it is the site of the Umhlanga (Reed Dance). It now Belongs to the current king, King Misuzulu

== History ==
This area was once the home of King Zwide, a late 18th-century Ndwandwe monarch who was eventually defeated by Shaka at the beginning of the Mfecane wars.

On 30 March 1883, a Zulu Mandlakazi force under Zibhebhu, defeated a larger uSuthu force (who represented Cetshwayo) in the Msebe Valley near Nongoma. In early March 1883, Zibhebhu had seized the uSuthu kraals (livestock pens) in the heartland of the uSuthu in northern Zululand. which he had been allotted in an expansion of his chiefdom in the Second Partition of Zululand of 1882. In response Ndabuko (Cetshwayo's younger brother) gathered around 5,000 uSuthu warriors who marched northward under Makhoba kaMaphitha to retake the kraals. Known as the Battle of Msebe, Makhoba led the uSuthu in an attack on Zibhebhu's Mandlakazi forces. The defenders were assisted by five or six Boer allies. They killed over 1,000 of the uSuthu, estimates vary upwards.

The town itself was only established in 1887 with the building of Fort Ivuna by the British as a buffer zone between the Zulu warring factions. It was originally called Ndwandwe but was later replaced by an earlier name given by the local tribesmen to the sacred area where the town stands: KwaNongoma ("place of the diviner or mother of songs").

In June 1888 Nongoma was destroyed by the uSuthu but later rebuilt. The fort was used during the Bambatha Rebellion of 1906.

Three Zulu monarchs are laid to rest in the Nongoma area:

- King Solomon kaDinuzulu (1891–1933), son of King Dinuzulu kaCetshwayo
- King Cyprian Bhekuzulu kaSolomon (1924–1968), son of King Solomon kaDinuzulu and father of the former Zulu King Goodwill Zwelithini.
- King Goodwill Zwelithini (1948–2021), son of King Cyprian Bhekuzulu kaSolomon and father of the reining amaZulu monarch, King Misuzulu Sinqobile kaZwelithini

== See also ==
- List of Zulu kings
