= Zulu Civil War =

Zulu Civil Wars may refer to:

- First Zulu Civil War (1839–1840) culminating in the Battle of Maqongqo and the death of Dingane
- Second Zulu Civil War (1856) culminating in the Battle of Ndondakusuka and the death of Mbuyazi
- Third Zulu Civil War (1883–1884), a.k.a. "uSuthu-Mandlakazi Conflict", where Zibhebhu kaMaphitha fought against Cetshwayo and the uSuthu
