= John Robert Dunn =

South African hunter, settler and diplomat (1834–1895)

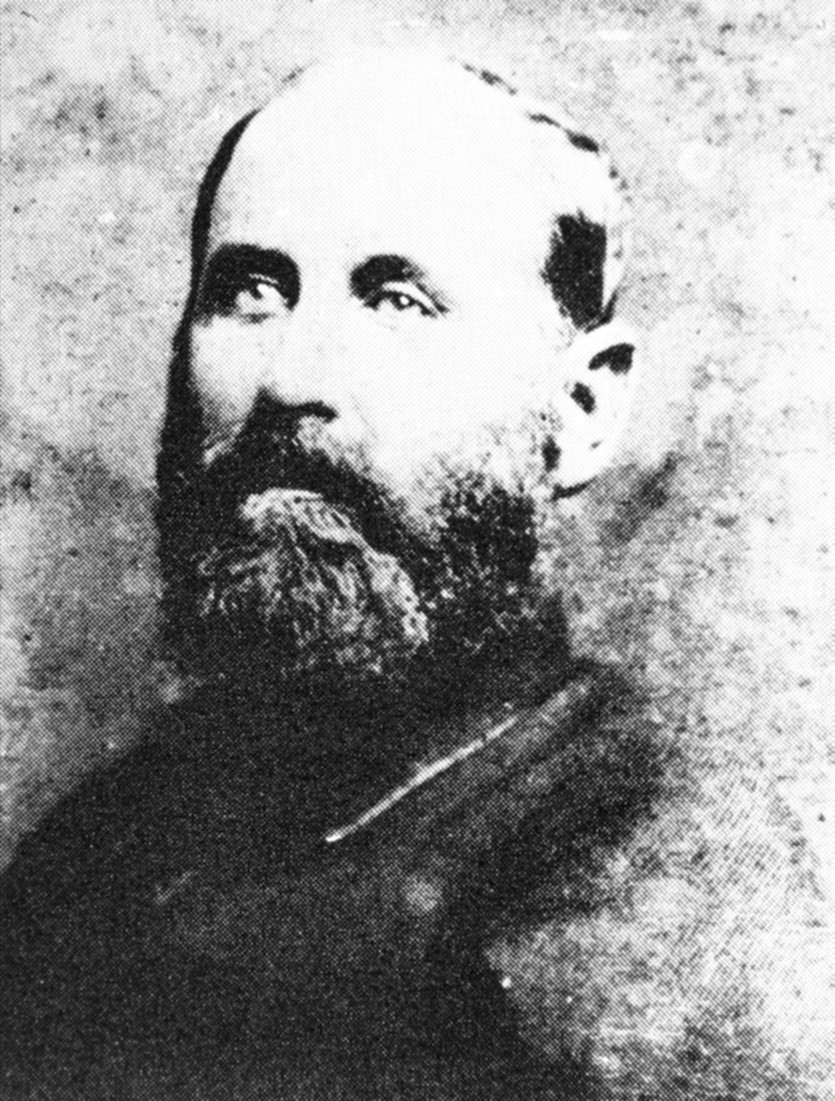
- Born: 1834; Port Alfred, Cape Colony (now Eastern Cape, South Africa)
- Died: 5 August 1895 (aged 60–61); Emoyeni, Colony of Natal (now Uthekela Municipality, Kwazulu-Natal, South Africa)
- Spouse(s): 1 Cape Malayan woman and 48 Zulu women
- Children: 117

John Robert Dunn (1834 – 5 August 1895) was a South African hunter and diplomat of British descent. Born in Port Alfred in 1834, he spent his childhood in Port Natal/Durban. He was orphaned as a teenager, and lived in native dress on the land near the Tugela River. His conversance with Zulu customs and language allowed his increasing influence among Zulu princes.

He was able to identify and exploit various opportunities for trade. He represented both colonial and Zulu interests, and rose to some influence and power when King Cetshwayo became the Zulu sovereign. He acted as Cetshwayo's secretary and diplomatic adviser and was rewarded with chieftainship, land, livestock and two Zulu virgins.

In the run-up to the Zulu War, he was served with an ultimatum by the British at the same time as Cetshwayo. He had to forgo any position of neutrality and sided with the British. In the aftermath, he was allocated land in a buffer zone between the colony and Zululand. Besides his first wife Catherine, he took many Zulu women as wives and left a large Christian progeny when he died at age 60 or 61.

== Early life ==
Dunn was born in Port Alfred in 1834. He was the son of Robert Newton Dunn. Resident of Port Elizabeth, Robert Dunn was one of the early settlers at Port Natal. On his mother's side, he was the grandson of Alexander Biggar. Robert Dunn worked as a trader, owned land at Sea View and became wealthy trading hides and ivory.

Dunn lost his parents early. When he was 14, his father was trampled to death by an elephant. His mother Anne died three years later. He started to earn a living by working for transport riders and hunters. His love of hunting and his skill with a rifle took him across the Tugela River into Zululand on a regular basis, where he became fluent in the language of isiZulu and was befriended by local chiefs.

In 1853, after a failure of payment for a transport to the Transvaal, due to being not of age and the lack of a contract, he wandered disillusioned around Zululand. Here he eventually met the Natal agent Captain Joshua Walmsley and returned to Natal with him, acting as his interpreter until 1856.

== Cetshwayo ==
In 1856, Zulu prince Mbuyasi, outnumbered by his brother Cetshwayo's forces, had requested help from Walmsley, which was refused. Dunn was sent instead to negotiate peace terms between the two warring Zulu brothers, which failed. With a small force of Native Police, Dunn supported the Zulu king Mpande's son Mbuyasi in the bloody battle of succession fought between him and the king's oldest son Cetshwayo. On 2 December 1856, at the Battle of Ndondakusuka, Mbuyazi's forces lost and he was killed, forcing Dunn and other white settlers to flee back to Natal.

After the battle, Cetshwayo then clashed with two English traders and took 1,000 head of cattle. His involvement in the battle led to resentment towards Dunn by the white settlers of Natal, so on his own account he re-crossed the Tugela to ask the winner, Cetshwayo, to return the cattle that had belonged to the traders. Cetshwayo agreed, and requested that Dunn become his advisor in matters related to the British. The cattle were returned. He resigned his position in Natal and settled in Zululand in June/July 1857 and was allocated land on the coast of southern Zululand at oNgoya.

With use of his land, Zulu marriages and the loaning of cattle, Dunn built a network of clients and contacts along the Zululand coast that allowed him to exploit the region's wealth. During the 1860s, he was involved in the trade of firearms into Zululand with the exchange of cattle for rifles via Lourenço Marques along the Zululand coast, as well as the flow of Tsonga workers to Natal for the agricultural industry, from the former. He would later be appointed as Protector of Immigrants for Zululand in 1874 by Theophilus Shepstone. Another important business income for Dunn was hunting. Organising his Zulu subjects as hunters, guides and porters, they successfully hunted for ivory, hides and skins, but by 1880, game had become scarce in Zululand.

On 18 October 1872, King Mpande died at the age of 74 and Cetshwayo became king. Dunn's power and influence rose; he handled nearly all of Cetshwayo's foreign correspondence. Though Mpande and Cetshwayo had successfully resisted attempts by the Boers and the British to encroach on their territory, the Anglo-Zulu War of 1879 forced John Dunn to pick sides, and he sided with the British.

== Anglo-Zulu War and its aftermath ==
On 11 January 1879, British troops crossed the Tugela, near Fort Pearson, to present Cetshwayo with an ultimatum that amongst other things, included the disbandment of the Zulu Army and the age-group system within twenty days, which he could not and would not accept. Dunn accompanied the Zulu Indunas to Fort Pearson to receive Bulwer's ultimatum for Cetshwayo. Fearing for his life, he did not deliver the ultimatum to Cetshwayo and retired to Emangete, wanting to remain neutral in the conflict between the British and the Zulu.

So began the Anglo-Zulu War. He was persuaded to take part on the British side by Lord Chelmsford and was in charge of the Intelligence Department. He and his scouts provided excellent service to the British forces and took part in the Battle of Gingindlovu and in the relief of Eshowe. After the Zulu's early success at the Battle of Isandlwana where they soundly defeated the British, they were themselves defeated at the Battle of Ulundi, which resulted in the eventual capture of Cetshwayo.

On 1 September 1879, Zululand was annexed and incorporated in Natal. In the Ulundi Settlement of 1879, Dunn was given the largest piece of land of all thirteen rulers in the subdivision of Zululand, which was also closest to Durban, placing him in charge of a buffer zone between the British and the less-trusted rulers. These subdivisions would last until Cetshwayo returned from exile in January 1883. Then the thirteen chiefs were disposed, Dunn lost his power and income and was included in a large native reserve under the control of the British Commander Sir Garnet Wolseley.

== Marriage ==
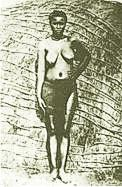
One of Dunn's wives

Though he was already married to Catherine Pierce - daughter of a white settler father and mother of Cape Malay ancestry - he accepted a total of 48 Zulu wives during his lifetime, much to Catherine's disapproval. Apart from two wives presented to him by Cetshwayo after a gift of two firearms, he followed Zulu custom and paid lobola of nine to fifteen cattle for each of the other forty-six wives. The Zulu wives came from twenty-three different clans mostly from the southern and central coastal regions. All were married in the native custom, though some were baptised, converting as Roman Catholics or Anglicans, with all his children brought up as Christians and given some schooling.

Dunn's residences were constructed in the form of traditional Zulu kraals. His western style house stood at its centre, with separate beehive huts for his wives, soldiers, servants and Zulu visitors, cattle kraals, stables and food storage pits, all surrounded by a hedge of thorns. He maintained kraals at Mangete, Emoyeni and Ngoya with wives at each place. He banished several wives for breaching his household rules. His wives and children were not allowed to interact socially with his white guests and his coloured children were discouraged from any serious interaction with their white siblings.

== Later years and heritage ==
John Dunn died on 5 August 1895 of dropsy and heart disease and was buried at Emoyeni in the Colony of Natal, having married 48 wives and fathered 117 children. He was survived by 23 wives including Catherine, besides 33 sons and 46 daughters. Catherine died on 27 January 1905, at age 72. All of Dunn's dependents were settled on a 40 km^{2} reserve near the Tugela River. Their ownership of the land was confirmed by the John Dunn Land Distribution Acts of 1902 and 1935.

It was however only by 1974, during the Apartheid years and 84 years since the death of John Dunn, that the Dunn family was able to obtain title deeds for Dunnsland, i.e. Mangete and Emoyeni. This process, complicated by racial legislation, was driven by Daniel Dunn, great-grandson of John and the then chairman of the Dunn's Descendants Association.

Starting 1971 however, a neighbouring Zulu chief laid claim to the 68 farms. The situation escalated from 1996 onwards when chief Nkosi Mathaba began settling his Macambini clan members on the Dunn farms, and some 2,000 squatters built their shacks on the cane plantations. In 2004, after an eight-year court battle, the land was restored to the Dunn family, of whom almost 1,000 were still resident on the farms.

== Bibliography ==
- Ballard, Charles (1985). John Dunn: The White Chief of Zululand. Ad. Donker. ISBN 9780868520063..
- John Dunn, John Dunn, Cetywayo and the Three Generals, Cambridge University Press, 2011 (first published 1886).
- Green, Michael. "History in Fiction: Oliver Walker and John Dunn". English in Africa, vol. 15, no. 1, 1988, pp. 29–53. JSTOR, www.jstor.org/stable/40238613. Accessed 11 June 2020.

== Fictions ==
- Mark Derobertis, John Dunn: Heart of a Zulu, Knox Robinson Publishing, 2017.
