= Grandier =

Grandier is a French surname. People of this name include:

- Ernest Grandier (fl. 1879-1884), French soldier of the Anglo-Zulu War
- Urbain Grandier (1590-1634), French Catholic priest burned at the stake for witchcraft
