= Bertram Mitford =

Bertram Mitford may refer to:

- Bertram Freeman-Mitford, 1st Baron Redesdale (1837–1916), British diplomat, collector and writer
- Bertram Mitford (novelist) (1855–1914), British colonial writer, novelist, essayist and cultural critic
- Bertram Mitford (British Army officer) (1863–1936)
