= Hamu kaNzibe =

Zulu chieftain

Hamu kaNzibe or uHamu kaNzibe (c. 1834–1887) was a Zulu chieftain, half-brother and great rival of king Cetshwayo.

== History ==
Rivalry between the sons of Zulu king Mpande was rife, even during his lifetime; he lived until 1872. Although Hamu was the eldest son of Mpande, he was not favored by his father, and Zulu succession would be determined by whose mother was eventually selected as Mpande's "Great Wife". Mpande first favored Umtonga, then groomed Mbuyazi to succeed him, but finally decided that Cetshwayo was a better choice. This rivalry led in 1856 to the Battle of Ndondakusuka and the death of Mbuyazi, and several of Mpande's other sons. At this point, if not sooner, Cetshwayo became the de facto king, although King Mpande continued the ceremonial duties.

Then Mpande's son Umtonga asserted himself, but in turn felt the wrath of Cetshwayo. In 1861 after Cetshwayo ordered the deaths of his half-brothers, sons of Mpande's favorite wife Nomantshali; Umtonga took the hint and fled to northwest Zululand, which under agreements of 1852 and 1854 made by Mpande, was occupied by the Boers, who knew it as Utrecht district. Cetshwayo offered the Boers an additional strip of land along the border if they would surrender his brother, but they did so under the condition that Cetshwayo wouldn't kill him. Mpande signed a deed making over the land to the Boers. The southern boundary of that strip ran from Rorke's Drift on the Buffalo River to a point on the Pongola. A cairn was set up in 1864 demarking the new border, but when in 1865 Umtonga again fled from Zululand to Natal, Cetywayo, seeing that he had lost his part of the bargain (for he feared that Umtonga might be used to supplant him as Mpande had been used to supplant Dingane), caused the cairn to be removed. This became the "Disputed Land" that led in part to the Anglo-Zulu War.

In order to forestall his rivals, chief among whom were his half brothers Umtonga and Hama, Cetshwayo invited the British, in the person of Theophilus Shepstone, to his September 1873 coronation.

Under Zulu succession law (ukuvuza), Hamu was inKosi (chief) of the Ngenetsheni people, who lived in northwestern Zululand, including formerly in the "Disputed Land". As eldest he had inherited it from his uncle Nzibe, the senior son of Senzangakhona. He maintained his stronghold at kwaMfemfe.

During the Second Zulu Civil War Hamu fought alongside Cetshwayo. He remained a member of the Zulu royal council (iBandla) until 1879. In late 1878, Hamu opened negotiations with the British hoping to get their support for his taking the Zulu throne. In March 1879, he joined Evelyn Wood's forces at Kambula. In retribution, Cetshwayo subsequently sent an army unit to destroy the Ngenetsheni villages and cattle, thus setting the stage for the Third Zulu Civil War of 1883–1884.

== See also ==
- Battle of Hlobane
