= Nongoma Local Municipality =

Nongoma
- Local municipality
- Seal

- Location of Nongoma Local Municipality within KwaZulu-Natal
- Coordinates: 27°55′S 31°39′E
- Country: South Africa
- Province: KwaZulu-Natal
- District: Zululand
- Seat: Nongoma
- Wards: 23

Government
  - Type: Municipal council

Area
  - Total: 2,182 km^{2} (842 sq mi)

Population (2011)
  - Total: 194,908
  - Density: 89.33/km^{2} (231.4/sq mi)

Racial makeup (2011)
  - Black African: 99.5%
  - Coloured: 0.1%
  - Indian/Asian: 0.2%
  - White: 0.1%

First languages (2011)
  - Zulu: 96.5%
  - Other: 3.5%
- Time zone: UTC+2 (SAST)
- Municipal code: KZN265

Nongoma Municipality (Zulu: UMasipala wakwaNongoma) is a local municipality within the northeastern part of the Zululand District Municipality, in the KwaZulu-Natal province of South Africa. It is Zululand's second largest municipality in terms of population and the second largest in terms of area. It shares its name with the town of Nongoma, which serves as the seat of the municipality.

Nongoma is predominantly a rural municipality. It encompasses 363 settlements, only of which Nongoma has some urban characteristics. 98.34% of the population lives in rural areas. The level of education is low, as only 33% of the population has completed primary education and only 5.3% has an education up to Grade 12.

== Infrastructure and facilities ==
The Nongoma Local Municipality has one hospital and twelve clinics/health facilities. There is one full-fledged police station, one social development office facility, one full-fledged post office, one library, and two sports facilities. There are about 25 community primary schools, 13 high schools, and one Further Education and Training (FET) college active in the area.

Only 12% of the community have access to electricity. The remaining 88% meet their energy needs using hydrocarbon (coal, gas, and paraffin) and/or biomass (wood, cow-dung, and crop waste). The task of collecting these have severe social and health costs which accrue primarily to rural women and children.

A radial network of roads converges in Nongoma Local Municipality. The rural roads are generally in poor condition and are often inaccessible during the rainy season. Although there are 12 clinics that serve the three tribal authority areas, a number of people still do not have access to these clinics due to poor road conditions and limited access to roads. In some areas there are no clinics and thus the people are deprived of basic health care. The situation contributes to the poor health conditions in the municipality.

Almost 56% of Nongoma's communities have no access to a telephone network. Only 1% of the municipality's households have a telephone in their actual dwelling.

There is an airstrip at eBukhalini that services the flight needs of the region. The airstrip is mainly used by specialist surgeons who visit the local Benedictine Hospital on a regular basis. The local business community and the king of the Zulu nation also use the airstrip.

== Natural environment ==
The rugged mountainous terrain and the contrasting grass lands of Nongoma provide a scenic quality. However, the environment in Nongoma is currently in a state of degradation. Overgrazing and incorrect cultivation methods have led to erosion and the degradation of field quality. Important river systems are the Ivuna River, Black Mfolozi River and Mona River. Water pollution is a common problem in the area as the people use the rivers for all purposes, including washing clothes, animal feed, human consumption and other purposes. In many areas the rivers and streams are the only water source available to the communities.

== Politics ==
The municipal council consists of forty-five members elected by mixed-member proportional representation. Twenty-three councillors are elected by first-past-the-post voting in twenty-three wards, while the remaining twenty-two are chosen from party lists so that the total number of party representatives is proportional to the number of votes received.

In the election of 4 November 2026, the Inkatha Freedom Party (IFP) retained the majority it had won following the by-elections earlier in the year, winning 23 seats.

The following table shows the results of the election.

Party	Ward			List			Total seats
Party	Votes	%	Seats	Votes	%	Seats	Total seats
Inkatha Freedom Party	27,778	50.78	21	28,200	51.72	2	23
uMkhonto weSizwe Party	10,861	19.85	1	10,961	20.10	8	9
African National Congress	6,142	11.23	1	5,957	10.92	4	5
National Freedom Party	5,718	10.45	0	5,542	10.16	5	5
Economic Freedom Fighters	1,181	2.16	0	1,148	2.11	1	1
National People's Front	855	1.56	0	689	1.26	1	1
African Transformation Movement	584	1.07	0	587	1.08	1	1
Independent candidates	106	0.19	0				0
8 other parties	1,479	2.70	0	1,445	2.65	0	0
Total	54,704	100.00	23	54,529	100.00	22	45
Valid votes	54,704	99.00		54,529	98.97		
Invalid/blank votes	552	1.00		566	1.03		
Total votes	55,256	100.00		55,095	100.00		
Registered voters/turnout	110,230	50.13		110,230	49.98		

== Main places ==
The 2001 census divided the municipality into the following main places:

Place	Code	Area (km^{2})	Population
Mandlakazi	53001	1,334.31	105,341
Matheni	53002	231.88	20,339
Nongoma	53003	10.13	2,743
Usuthu	53004	609.02	70,020
