= Cornelius Vijn =

Dutch trader

- Born: 1856; Hoorn, Holland
- Other name: Viljoen
- Occupation: Trader
- Employer: Cetshwayo
- Known for: Prisoner of and advisor to the Zulu during the Anglo-Zulu War
- Notable work: Cetshwayo's Dutchman

Cornelius Vijn, also known as Viljoen, (born 1856) was a Dutch trader who was captured from his homestead and held as a captive before later becoming an advisor for Cetshwayo during the Anglo-Zulu War. He would gain fame after publishing his personal journal relating his experience under the Zulu monarch.

== Biography ==
Vijn was born in Hoorn, Holland in 1856.

In 1874 Vijn would move to Natal and begin working as a trader where he would trade blankets for cattle in the colony. Starting in 1878 he would begin making trips to Zululand.

At the beginning of the Anglo-Zulu War Vijn was seized from his homestead in Zululand. He would be brought to King Cetshwayo who placed him under his protection. During this time Vijn began to act as an advisor and secretary. He would also act as a translator for communications between the king and British forces. While writing translated replies for the king he would warn the British Commander Chelmsford of gathering Zulu forces just prior to the Battle of Ulundi. After the battle, Vijn was hired by Sir Garnet Wolseley to track down the Zulu king but was unable to locate him.

== The Journal ==
Vijn would keep a journal describing his experiences, largely defending the Zulu king under the title Cetshwayo's Dutchman. In his work he would relate how the Zulu people mourned following losses in battle, how they would continuously ask him to explain the alien practices of the British, and how they demanded that he reveal their supernatural powers.

In 1880, Vijn's journal was published by Bishop Colenso.
