= Oliver Walker (journalist) =

South African writer (1906-1965)

Oliver Walker (1906 – 25 December 1965) was a journalist and writer of fiction and non-fiction works predominantly about South Africa where he lived for most of his adult life. He wrote two historical novels based on the life of John Dunn.

== Family ==
Oliver Walker was born in Birmingham, England in 1906. His father was the Western Mail leader writer and founder member of the National Union of Journalists (NUJ), James Atkinson Walker (1878–1954).

== Biography ==
Walker started his journalistic career in the UK, living in Cardiff, London and Bristol, before emigrating to South Africa in 1937. He worked briefly for I. W. Schlesinger's Daily Express in Johannesburg, and wrote about this period in his autobiographical novel Wanton City (1949).

In 1944, he was seconded to the Native Affairs Department in Pretoria, where he was assigned "a war-time propaganda job for the State Bureau of Information". After travelling extensively in South Africa accompanied by a Department official and submitting a lengthy report he heard no more of his account, probably because it was highly critical of the work of the department and government policy. Instead, he published his findings in his colourful and excoriating book Kaffirs Are Lively: Being Some Backstage Impressions of the South African Democracy (1949) which was well received and published in several editions. This was followed by a sequel Kaffirs Are Livelier, White Man Boss published shortly before Walker's death, in 1964.

Walker continued working in journalism, joining The Star as a sub-editor and later a critic. During this period he produced his well-researched biographical account of John Dunn, Proud Zulu (1949), which he reconfigured in his later work Zulu Royal Feather (1961). Walker was fascinated with John Dunn and his final work was a biography of Dunn's son Tom, The Hippo Poacher, published posthumously in 1967.

Walker died in South Africa on Christmas Day, 1965 leaving his widow Elfreda Mary Walker (née Miller).
