= Zibhebhu kaMaphitha =

Zulu chief

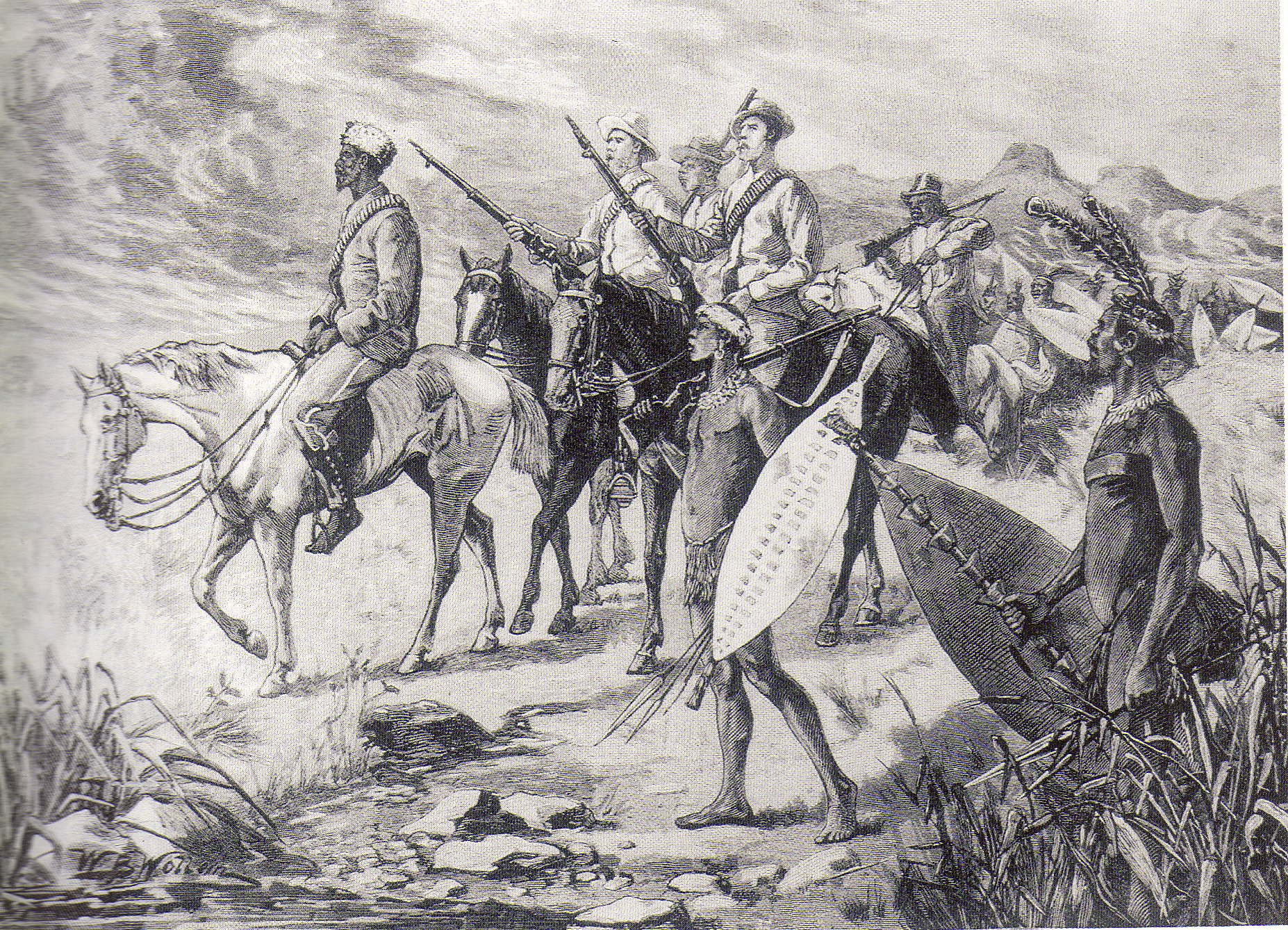
Zibhebhu after the battle of oNdini, 21 July 1883

Zibhebhu kaMaphitha Zulu (c. 1841–1904) (also called Usibepu/Ziphewu) was a Zulu chief. After the defeat of the Zulu Kingdom by the British, he attempted to create his own independent kingdom. From 1883 to 1884, he fought the Zulu king Cetshwayo, inflicting a series of defeats on him.

== Life ==
Zibhebhu was a son of Maphita, son of Sojiyisa, son of Jama, son of Ndaba. He belonged to Mandlakazi Royal Homestead. Zibhebhu was induna (chief) of the Mandlakazi.

Zibhebhu was made chieftain of one of the thirteen chiefdoms resulting from the First Partition of Zululand after the Anglo-Zulu War, The chiefdom was in northern Zululand, a hotbed of uSuthu, and the British General Wolseley thought that Zibhebhu's rule there would help suppress them.

In 1882, after pleas from Cetshwayo, the British Foreign Office relented and restored eight of the central "chiefdoms" to Cetshwayo's superintending control; however, in this Second Partition of Zululand Zibhebhu's chiefdom in the north was expanded to include more uSuthu lands and Zibhebhu remained independent of Cetshwayo.

In March 1883, Zibhebu undertook to secure the kraals in his new territory, which were held by the local uSuthu. Despite some resistance, there were all successfully seized. The USuthu in the south took exception to this, and Makhoba kaMaphitha marched north with some 5,000 warriors to retake the kraals. The defending Mandlakazi, 1,500 warriors assisted by five or six Boers under Johannes Wilhelm Colenbrander, set an ambush in Msebe Valley near Nongoma. This confrontation became known as the Battle of Msebe, and over 1,000 of the uSuthu were killed, with estimates running as high as 4,000. The Mandlakazi suffered minor casualties, with only ten dead.

Both Zibhebhu and Dinuzulu befriended Boer mercenaries to help them in their claims. On the 22 July 1883, led by a small troop of mounted white mercenaries, Zibhebhu made a sudden descent upon Cetshwayo's oNdini kraal (near Ulundi) which was being rebuilt. The uSuthu there were surprised, some attempted a defence but were soon routed, and Zibhebhu's forces destroyed the king's kraal as well as the surrounding uSuthu kraals. Cetshwayo's senior military staff including general Ntshingwayo Khoza were chased down and killed as they fled after losing the battle. Though wounded, Cetshwayo managed to escape to the White Mfolozi river and then took refuge with Sigananda in the Nkandla forest. After repeated pleas from the Resident Commissioner, Sir Melmoth Osborn, the king moved to Eshowe, where he died a few months later, possibly by poisoning.

Zibhebhu vied for the royal succession with another of Cetshwayo's sons, Dinuzulu. On Cetshwayo's death, Dinuzulu was left to fight for the succession, and with the help of General Louis Botha and Dinuzulu's Volunteers defeated Zibhebhu and his army at the Battle of Ghost Mountain (also known as the Battle of Tshaneni).

Zibhebhu and Eckersley, a white trader, escaped by climbing the Lubombo mountain. In September 1884 Zibhebhu guided the remnant of the Mandlakazi, about 6,000 people, into the "Reserve Territory"; an area set aside by the British for Zulu not loyal to the Zulu royal house.
