= Mandlakazi =

Zulu clan

The Mandlakazi are a Zulu clan in KwaZulu-Natal and formerly in Zululand. They started out as allies of Shaka as he founded the Zulu nation. The Mandlakazi derived wealth not only from cattle but from an extensive trade network that extended from northern Zululand north and east to Delagoa Bay in Mozambique.

The leader of the Mandlakazi was an inkosi (chief), and the position generally passed from father to son. Ndaba was the first known Mandlakazi inkosi and he was followed by his son Jama, who was Shaka's grandfather. Jama's son Senzangakhona fathered Shaka, and his son Sojiyisa was the inkosi of the Mandlakazi who befriended his young nephew Shaka. Sojiyisa's son, Maphitha was the inkosi of the Mandlakazi until 1872, having been given, by Shaka, suzerainty over the former Ndwandwe territory in northeastern Zululand. Although as early at 1856, during the Second Zulu Civil War, Maphitha's son Zibhenhu came to the favorable attention of Cetshwayo. In 1872 Zibhebhu kaMaphitha succeeded to inKosi of the Mandlakazi people. He was confirmed as inKosi in 1879 by General Wolseley after the Anglo-Zulu War.

Zibhenhu and the Mandlakazi were decisively defeated on 5 June 1884 by the combined forces of King Dinuzulu and the Boers at the Battle of Ghost Mountain (Battle of Tshaneni). Although Zibhenhu survived the battle, the survivors and their women and children were exiled to the "Reserve Territory" around Eshowe and the Mandlakazi ceased to be a viable force.
