= Zulu Kingdom =

1816–1897 native state in southern Africa

Coordinates: 28°17′51″S 31°25′18″E

Kingdom of Zululand KwaZulu
- 1816–1897
- Location of the Zulu Kingdom, c. 1890 (red) (borders in flux)
- Status: Protectorate of the United Kingdom 1887–1897
- Capital: kwaBulawayo; uMgungundlovu; Ulundi
- Common languages: isiZulu
- Religion: Zulu religion Later on Christianity
- Government: Absolute Monarchy
- Inkosi
  - 1816–1828: Shaka
  - 1828–1840: Dingane
  - 1840–1856: Mpande
  - 1856–1884: Cetshwayo
  - 1884–1887: Dinuzulu
- History
  - Death of Dingiswayo: 1818
  - Accession of Shaka: 1816
  - Battle of Gqokli Hill: 1818
  - Battle of Mhlatuze River: 1820
  - Battle of Blood River: 1838
  - Anglo-Zulu War: 1879
  - British protectorate: 1887
  - to Natal: 1897

Area
- 1822: 207,000 km^{2} (80,000 sq mi)

Population
  - 1828: 250,000
- Currency: Sanga cattle
Preceded by
Mtetwa Paramountcy
Succeeded by
Natalia Republic
Nieuwe Republiek
Colony of Natal
- Today part of: South Africa

The Zulu Kingdom (/ˈzuːluː/ ZOO-loo; Zulu: KwaZulu), sometimes referred to as the Zulu Empire, was a monarchy in Southern Africa. During the 1810s, Shaka established a standing army that consolidated rival clans and built a large following which ruled a wide expanse of Southern Africa that extended along the coast of the Indian Ocean from the Tugela River in the south to the Pongola River in the north, centred on the present KwaZulu-Natal province of South Africa.

A civil war in the mid-19th century erupted which culminated in the 1856 Battle of Ndondakusuka between the brothers Cetshwayo and Mbuyazi. In 1879, a British force invaded Zululand, beginning the Anglo-Zulu War. After an initial Zulu victory at the Battle of Isandlwana in January, the British regrouped and defeated the Zulus in July during the Battle of Ulundi, ending the war. The area was absorbed into the Colony of Natal and later became part of the Union of South Africa. The current Zulu king is Misuzulu Sinqobile, who serves as the monarch of South Africa's KwaZulu-Natal province.

== History ==
=== Background ===
The founding of the Zulu Kingdom was precipitated by the Mfecane, a period of widespread instability and state formation in Southern Africa, caused by pre-existing trends of political centralisation which were catalysed by the effects of international trade, environmental instability, and European colonial expansion.

=== Rise under Shaka ===
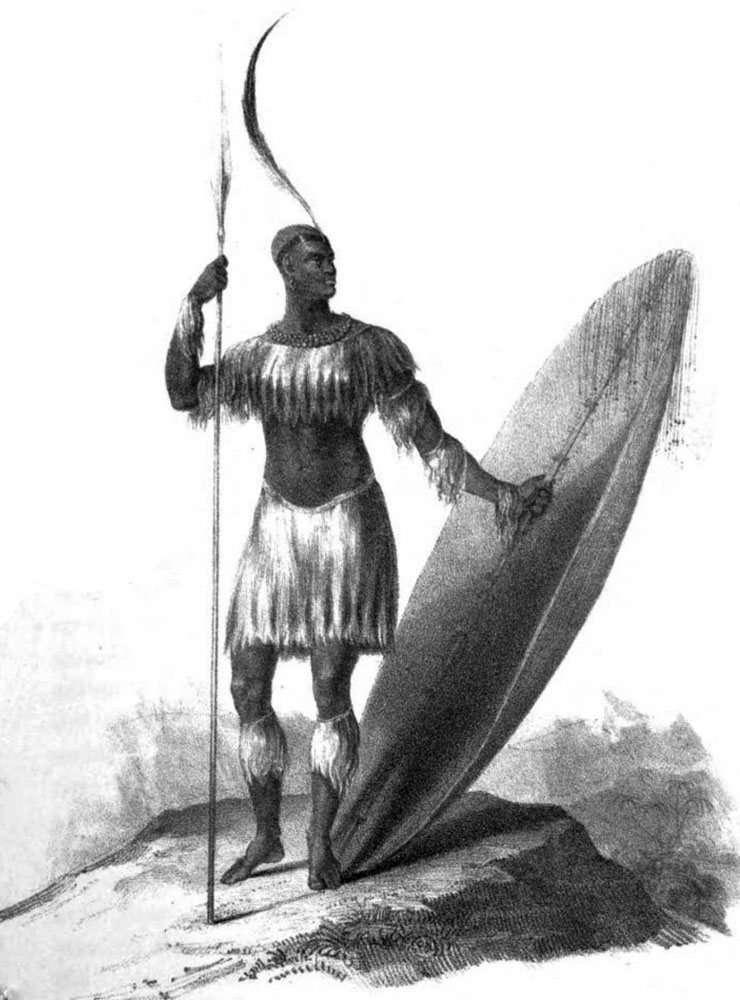
Drawing of King Shaka (c. 1824)

Shaka was the illegitimate son of Senzangakhona, Chief of the Zulus. He was born c. 1787. He and his mother, Nandi, were exiled by Senzangakhona, and found refuge with the Mthethwa. Shaka fought as a warrior under Dingiswayo, leader of the Mthethwa Paramountcy. When Senzangakona died, Dingiswayo helped Shaka become king of the Zulu. After Dingiswayo's death at the hands of Zwide, king of the Ndwandwe, around 1816, Shaka assumed leadership of the entire Mthethwa alliance.

Shaka expanded the Zulu Kingdom through war and diplomacy. Shaka's clan at first numbered no more than a few thousands, but eventually grew in size to 45,000 after absorbing neighbouring clans. His military reforms included new battle techniques, training, and tough discipline, as well as the replacement of long throwing spears in exchange for the more effective short stabbing spears. Conscripted men were segregated from the rest of Zulu society to be trained as an organised standing army called the amabutho.

The alliance under his leadership survived Zwide's first assault at the Battle of Gqokli Hill (1818). Within two years, Shaka had defeated Zwide at the Battle of Mhlatuze River (1820) and broken up the Ndwandwe alliance. The Ngoni people fled as far north as Tanzania and Malawi. By 1822, Shaka had conquered an empire covering an area of around 80,000 square miles (210,000 km^{2}), covering Pongola to the Tugera Rivers. He was assassinated in 1828 with one of his assassins, his half brother Dingane, succeeding him.

An offshoot of the Zulu, the amaNdebele, better known to history as the Matabele, created an even larger empire under their king Mzilikazi, including large parts of the highveld and modern-day Zimbabwe.

=== Dingane's reign ===
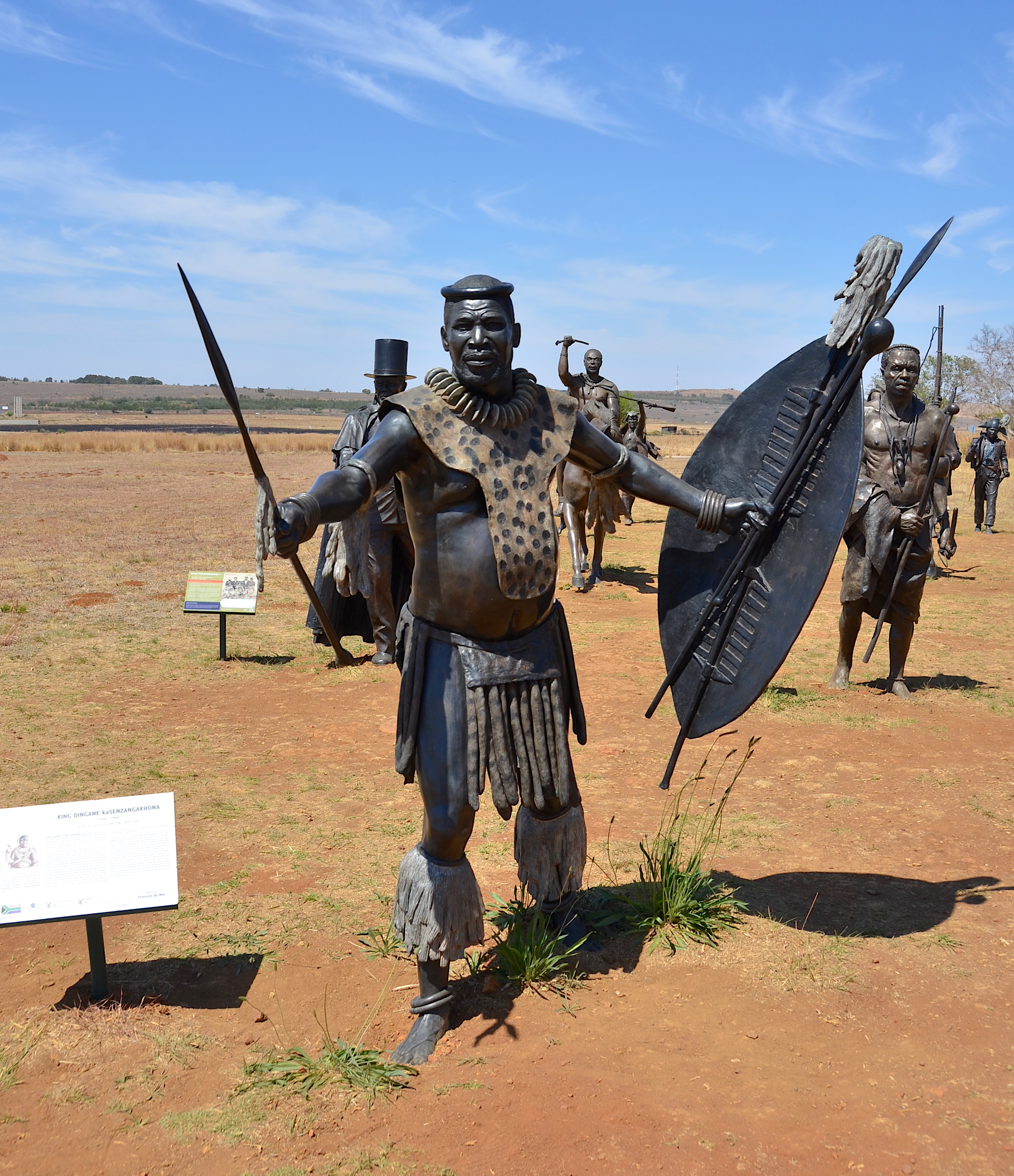
Bronze statue of King Dingane

Shaka was succeeded by Dingane, his half-brother, who conspired with Mhlangana, another half-brother, and Mbopa, an induna, to murder him in 1828. Following this assassination, Dingane murdered Mhlangana, and took over the throne. One of his first royal acts was to execute all of his royal kin. In the years that followed, he also executed many past supporters of Shaka in order to secure his position. One exception to these purges was Mpande, another half-brother, who was considered too weak to be a threat at the time.

==== Clashes with Voortrekkers ====
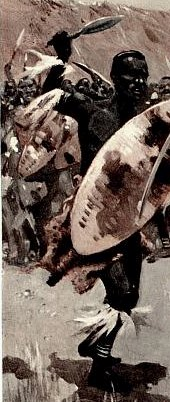
Military innovations such as the assegai, the age-grade regimental system and encirclement tactics helped make the Zulu one of the most powerful clans in southern and south-eastern Africa.

In the Cape Colony, increasing tensions between some Dutch Settlers and the British colonial authorities led to a wave of Boer (also known as Voortrekkers) migration northwards from 1836 onwards in order to establish autonomous Boer states independent of British control. The Boers settlers began moving across the Orange River northwards. While travelling they first collided with the Ndebele kingdom, and then with Dingane's Zulu kingdom. In October 1837, the Voortrekker leader Piet Retief visited Dingane at his royal kraal to negotiate a land deal for the voortrekkers. In November, about 1,000 Voortrekker wagons began descending the Drakensberg mountains from the Orange Free State into what is now KwaZulu-Natal.

Dingane asked that Retief and his party retrieve some cattle stolen from him by a local chief as part of the treaty for land for the Boers. This Retief and his men did, returning on 3 February 1838. The next day, a treaty was signed, wherein Dingane ceded all the land south of the Tugela River to the Mzimvubu River to the Voortrekkers. Celebrations followed. On 6 February, at the end of the celebrations, Retief's party were invited to a dance, and asked to leave their weapons behind. At the peak of the dance, Dingane leapt to his feet and yelled "Bambani abathakathi!" (isiZulu for "Seize the wizards").

Retief and his men were overpowered, taken to the nearby hill kwaMatiwane, and executed. Some allege that they were killed for withholding some of the cattle they recovered, but it is likely that the deal was a plot to overpower the Voortrekkers. Dingane's army then attacked and massacred a group of 250 Voortrekker men, women and children camped nearby. The site of this massacre is today called Weenen, (Dutch for "to weep"). The remaining Voortrekkers elected a new leader, Andries Pretorius, who led a successful defence of the Voortrekker position from the Zulu forces and Dingane at the Battle of Blood River on 16 December 1838, when an army of Zulu impis (warriors) attacked a group of around 600 Voortrekker settlers led by Pretorius.

=== Mpande's reign ===
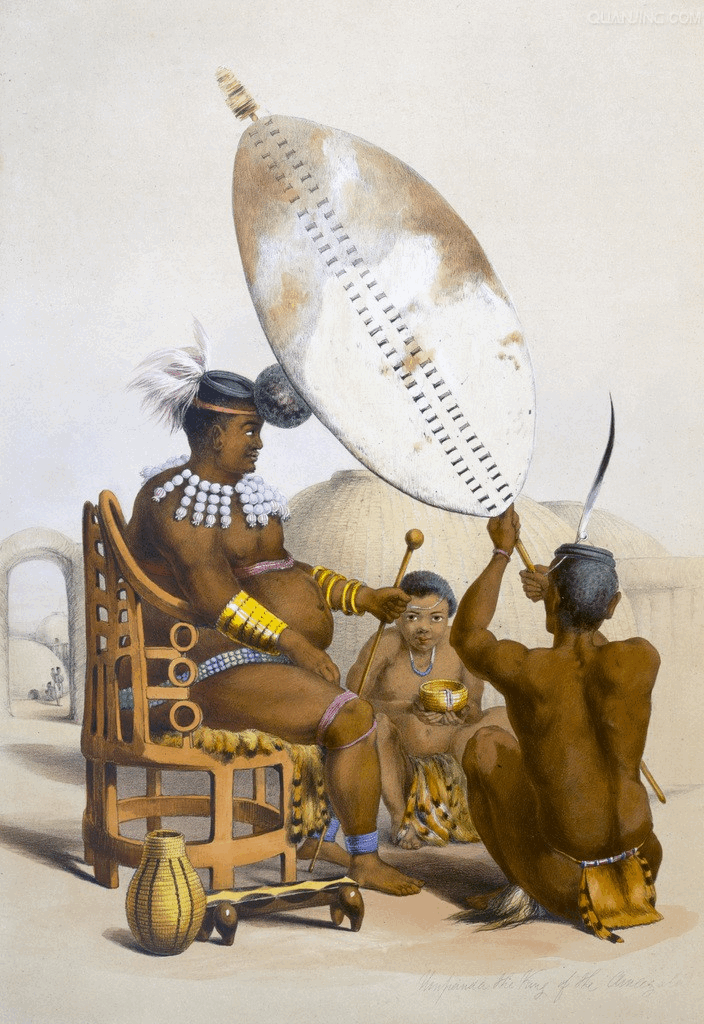
King Mpande, drawing by George French Angas

Following his defeat, Dingane burned his royal household and fled north. Mpande, the half-brother who had been spared from Dingane's purges, defected with 17,000 followers, and, together with Pretorius and the Voortrekkers, went to war with Dingane. Dingane was assassinated near the modern Swaziland border. Mpande then took over rulership of the Zulu nation.

Following the campaign against Dingane, in 1839 the Voortrekkers, under Pretorius, formed the Boer republic of Natalia, south of the Tugela, and west of the British settlement of Port Natal (now Durban). Mpande and Pretorius maintained peaceful relations. However, in 1842, war broke out between the British and the Boers, resulting in the British annexation of Natalia. Mpande shifted his allegiance to the British, and remained on good terms with them.

In 1843, Mpande ordered a purge of perceived dissidents within his kingdom. This resulted in numerous deaths, and the fleeing of thousands of refugees into neighbouring areas (including the British-controlled Natal). Many of these refugees fled with cattle, the main measure of the Zulu wealth. Mpande began raiding the surrounding areas, culminating in the invasion of Swaziland in 1852. However, the British pressured him into withdrawing, which he did shortly afterwards.

=== Cetshwayo's reign ===
At this time, a battle for the succession broke out between two of Mpande's sons, Cetshwayo and Mbuyazi. This culminated in 1856 with the Battle of Ndondakusuka, which left Mbuyazi dead. Cetshwayo then set about usurping his father's authority.

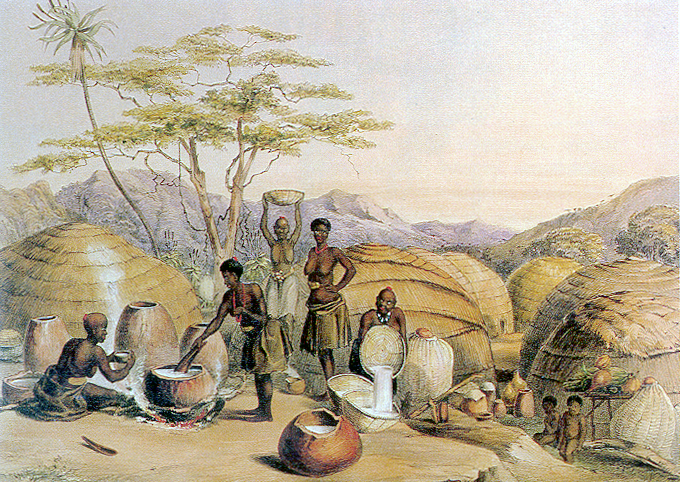
Zulu village, c. 1849

In 1861, Umtonga, another son of Mpande, fled to the Utrecht district, prompting Cetshwayo to assemble an army on the nearby frontier. The Boers agreed to surrender Umtonga in return for land as long as Umtonga's life was spared. The south boundary of the land added to Utrecht ran from Rorke's Drift on the Buffalo to a point on the Pongola River, and this was beaconed in 1864. Cetshwayo renounced the deal in 1865 when Umtonga fled to Natal as he feared that the still living Umtonga might be used to supplant him, as Mpande had been used to supplant Dingane. And removed the beacons along the frontier.

He also claimed the land ceded by the Swazis to Lydenburg. The Zulus asserted that the Swazis were their vassals and therefore had no right to part with this territory. For a year, a Boer commando unit, under Paul Kruger and an army under Cetshwayo were posted to defend the newly acquired Utrecht border. The Zulu forces took back their land north of the Pongola. Questions were also raised as to the validity of the documents signed by the Zulus concerning the Utrecht strip; in 1869 the services of the lieutenant-governor of Natal, then Robert William Keate, were accepted by both parties as arbitrator, but the attempt then made to settle disagreements proved unsuccessful.

In spite of his dislike for their activities, Cetshwayo permitted European missionaries in Zululand. Though he did not harm or persecute the missionaries themselves, several converts were killed. The missionaries, for their part, were a source of hostile reports. While numerous Zulus of rival factions fled into Natal and some of the surrounding areas, Cetshwayo continued and maintained the peaceful relations with the Natal colonists that had prevailed for decades.

After Mpande died of old age in 1872 Cetshwayo was acclaimed king by his izinduna in 1873 and had a coronation a month later where Shepstone as Natal's Secretary for Native Affairs proclaimed a set of 'coronation laws,' that challenged traditional Zulu social rites.

As ruler, Cetshwayo set about reviving the military methods of his uncle Shaka as far as possible. He formed new age-set regiments and even succeeded in equipping his regiments with a few antiquated muskets and other outdated firearms. Most Zulu warriors were armed with an iklwa (the Zulu refinement of the assegai thrusting spear) and a shield made of cowhide. (Note: Lock & Quantrill 2002, p. 62 quote John Shepstone, Acting Secretary for Native Affairs at the time on the Zulu army: saying "Equipment: Each man carries his shield and assegais, and a kaross or blanket if he possesses one, he may also have a war dress of monkey skins or ox tails, this is all.") The Zulu army drilled in the personal and tactical use and coordination of this weapons system. While some Zulus also had firearms, their marksmanship training was poor and the quality and supply of their powder and shot was dreadful. The Zulu attitude towards firearms was summarized: "The generality of Zulu warriors, however, would not have firearms – the arms of a coward, as they said, for they enable the poltroon to kill the brave without awaiting his attack."

==== British Conquest ====
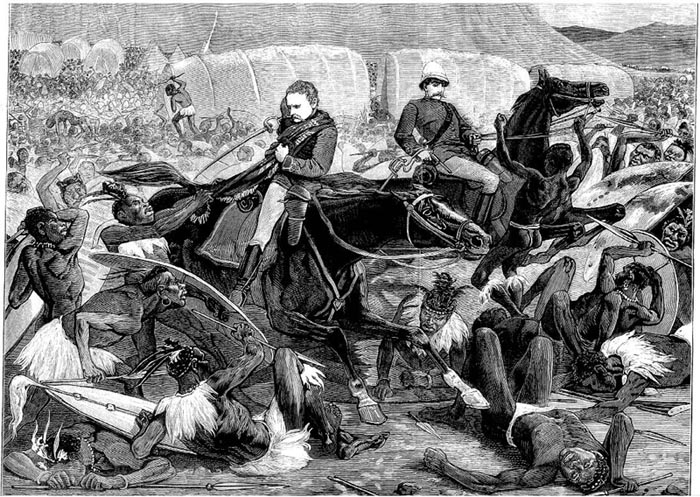
The Battle of Isandlwana, 1879

On 11 December 1878, with the intent of instigating a war with the Zulu, Sir Henry Bartle Frere, on his own initiative and without the approval of the British government, presented an ultimatum to the Zulu king Cetshwayo in terms with which he could not possibly comply: that the Zulu army be disbanded and the Zulus accept a British resident. British forces crossed the Tugela river at the end of December 1878. Initially, the British suffered a heavy defeat at the Battle of Isandlwana on 22 January 1879 where the Zulu army killed more than 1,000 British soldiers in a single day.

The Zulu deployment at Isandhlwana showed the well-organized tactical system that had made the Zulu kingdom successful for many decades. This constituted the worst defeat the British army had ever suffered at the hands of a native African fighting force. The defeat prompted a redirection of the war effort, and the British, though outnumbered, began winning small engagements and later larger setpiece encounters. The fighting culminated in the Siege of Ulundi, the Zulus' capital city, and the subsequent defeat of the Zulu Kingdom.

==== Division and the death of Cetshwayo ====
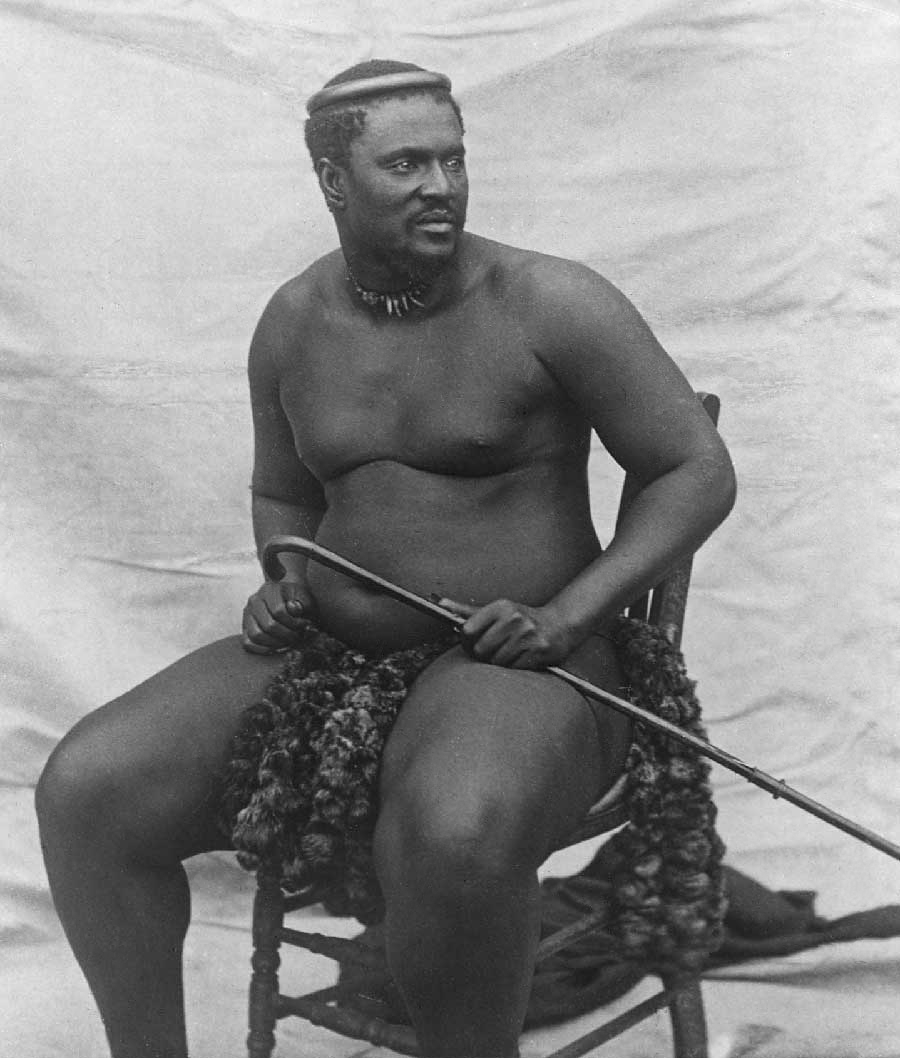
King Cetshwayo (c. 1875)

After the battle of Ulundi, the Zulu army dispersed, most of the leading chiefs tendered their submission, and Cetshwayo became a fugitive. Wolseley, having relieved Chelmsford after Ulundi, took over the final operations and on 28 August captured and eventually deposed the king. Cetshwayo was captured a month after his defeat, and then exiled to Cape Town.

Wolseley wasted no time in discarding Bartle Frere's confederation scheme and drew up a new scheme which divided Zululand into thirteen chiefdoms headed by compliant chiefs which ensured that the Zulus would no longer unite under a single king and made internal divisions and civil wars inevitable. The dynasty of Shaka was deposed, and the Zulu country portioned among eleven Zulu chiefs, including Zibhebhu, and two non Zulus John Robert Dunn, a white adventurer, and Hlubi, a Basuto chief allied to the British in the war.

The British passed rule of the Zulu kingdom onto 13 "kinglets", each with his own subkingdom. Conflict soon erupted between these subkingdoms, and in 1882, Cetshwayo was allowed to visit England. He had audiences with Queen Victoria and other famous personages before being allowed to return to Zululand to be reinstated as king.

In 1883, Cetshwayo was put in place as king over a buffer reserve territory, much reduced from his original kingdom. Later that year, however, Cetshwayo was attacked at Ulundi by Zibhebhu, one of the 13 kinglets. Cetshwayo was wounded and fled. Cetshwayo died in February 1884, possibly poisoned. His son, Dinuzulu, then 15, inherited the throne.

The academic Roberto Breschi notes that Zululand had a flag from 1884 to 1897 but this is pure conjecture as A.P. Burgers notes in his book. It consisted of three horizontal bands in equal width of gold, green and red.

=== Dinuzulu's reign and exile ===
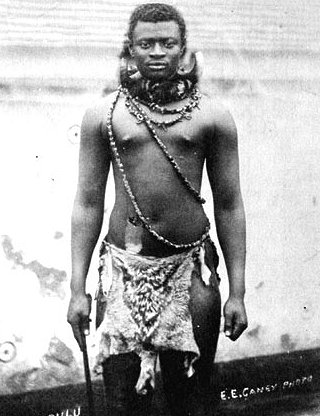
King Dinuzulu (c. 1883)

Dinuzulu made a pact with the Boers of his own, promising them land in return for their aid. The Boers were led by Louis Botha. Dinuzulu and the Boers defeated Zibhebhu in 1884. They were granted about half of Zululand individually as farms, and formed the independent Republic of Vryheid. This alarmed the British who wanted to prevent the Boers access to a harbour. The British then annexed Zululand in 1887. Dinuzulu became involved in later conflicts with rivals. In 1906 Dinuzulu was accused of being behind the Bambatha Rebellion. He was arrested and put on trial by the British for "high treason and public violence". In 1909, he was sentenced to ten years' imprisonment on St Helena island. When the Union of South Africa was formed, Louis Botha became its first prime minister, and he arranged for his old ally Dinuzulu to return to South Africa and live in exile on a farm in the Transvaal, where he died in 1913.

Dinuzulu's son Solomon kaDinuzulu was never recognised by South African authorities as the Zulu king, only as a local chief, but he was increasingly regarded as king by chiefs, by political intellectuals such as John Langalibalele Dube and by ordinary Zulu people. In 1923, Solomon founded the organisation Inkatha YaKwaZulu to promote his royal claims, which became moribund and then was revived in the 1970s by Mangosuthu Buthelezi, chief minister of the KwaZulu bantustan. In December 1951, Solomon's son Cyprian Bhekuzulu kaSolomon was officially recognised as the Paramount Chief of the Zulu people, but real power over ordinary Zulu people lay with South African government officials working through local chiefs who could be removed from office for failure to cooperate.

== Recent history ==
=== KwaZulu Bantustan ===
KwaZulu was a bantustan in South Africa, intended by the apartheid government as a semi-independent homeland for the Zulu people. The capital was moved from Nongoma to Ulundi in 1980.

It was led until its abolition in 1994 by Chief Mangosuthu Buthelezi of the Zulu royal family and head of the Inkatha Freedom Party (IFP). It was merged with the surrounding South African province of Natal to form the new province of KwaZulu-Natal.

The name KwaZulu translates roughly as Place of Zulus, or more formally Zululand.

=== Contemporary Zululand ===
The Zulu Kingdom is currently part of South Africa's KwaZulu-Natal (of which the King of the Zulu Nation is the monarch), one of the country's nine provinces, under the leadership of King MisuZulu ka Zwelithini. A large portion of the territory is made up of wildlife reserves and a major contributing source of income is derived from tourism – the area is known for its savanna covered hills. It is home to a WWF Black Rhinoceros reintroduction project known as "The Black Rhino Range Expansion Project" within the Zululand Rhino Reserve (ZRR). The ZRR is a 20,000 hectare reserve consisting of 15 individually owned farms that have lowered their fences in order to further conservation. The Zulu royal family still fulfils many important ceremonial duties.

== See also ==
- Zulu military system
  - Impi
- Zulu Civil War
- Anglo-Zulu War
- List of Zulu kings
- Postage stamps and postal history of Zululand
