= Battle of Ndondakusuka =

1856 battle between Zulu factions

- Part of Zulu Civil War
Date	2 December 1856
Location	Tugela River, KwaZulu-Natal, South Africa
Result	Decisive Cetshwayo/uSuthu victory

Belligerents
Cetshwayo faction (uSuthu)	Mbuyazi faction (iziGqoza)

Commanders and leaders
Cetshwayo	Mbuyazi; John Robert Dunn

Strength
c. 20,000	c. 7,000

Casualties and losses
Unknown	over 20,000 (including non-combatants)

The Battle of Ndondakusuka, often known as the Second Zulu Civil War, fought on 2 December 1856, was the culmination of a succession struggle in the Zulu Kingdom between Cetshwayo and Mbuyazi, the two eldest sons of King Mpande. Mbuyazi was defeated at the battle and was killed, leaving Cetshwayo in de facto control of the kingdom, though his father remained king. Mbuyazi's followers, including five other sons of King Mpande, were massacred in the aftermath of the battle.

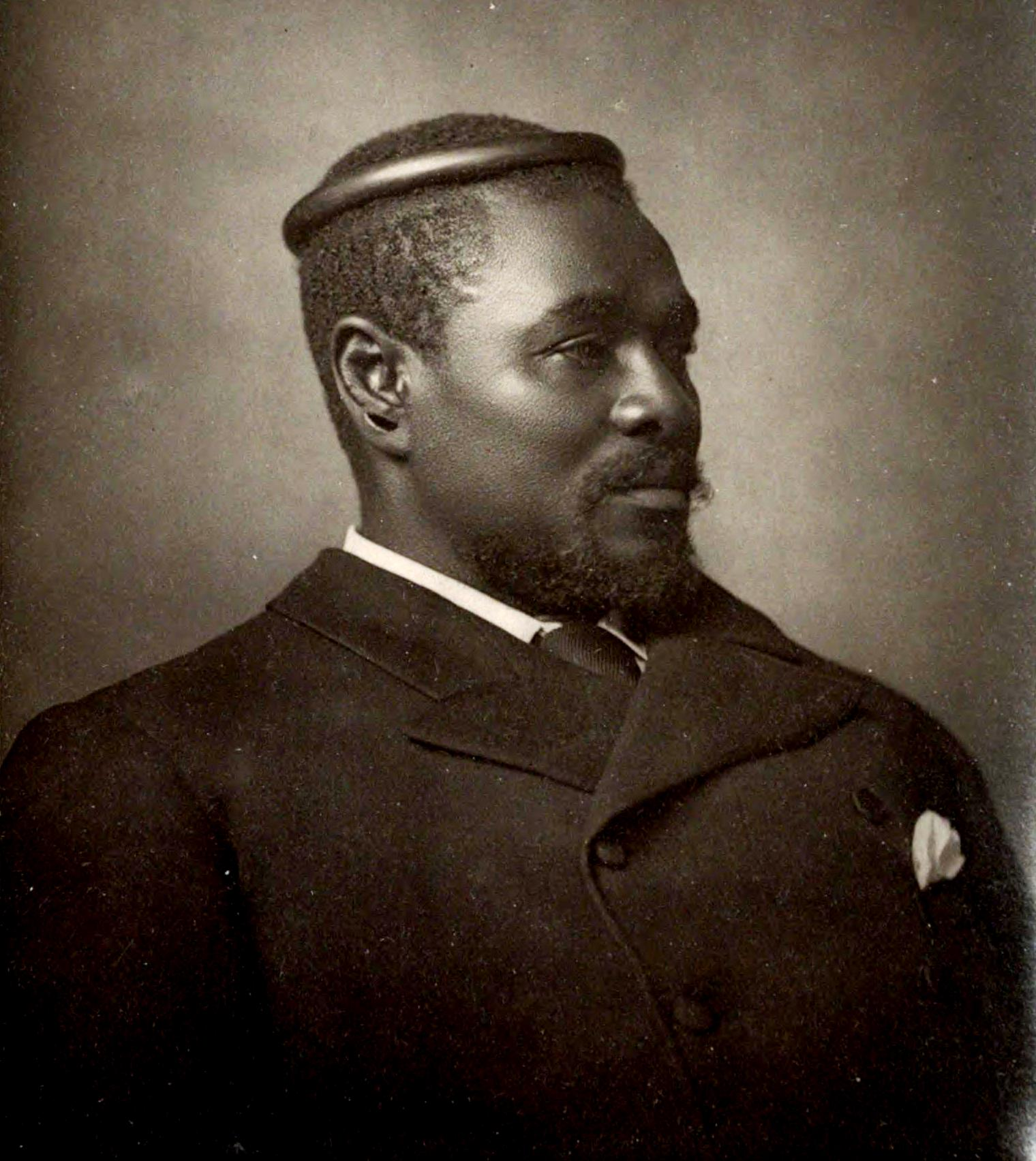
Cetshwayo ka Mpande

== Background ==
Inheritance and succession in Zulu society followed complex rules, but stated simply, the first-born son of a chief's "great wife" was the presumptive heir, although identification of "great wife" was often delayed until a chief neared his end. With respect to the Zulu king, succession had been murky ever since 1816 when Shaka had supplanted his half-brother and presumptive heir Sigujana.

Cetshwayo was the eldest son of the King Mpande kaSenzangakhona. Many of the izikhulu supported Cetshwayo, but Mpande favoured his next-eldest son Mbuyazi. Previous kings had succeeded to the throne through bloody means, and Mpande's successor would face the same trial.

Mbuyazi was Mpande's second son by a widow of Shaka. The higher status was Mpande's justification that the elder Cetshwayo should be bypassed. At a sacrifice of an ox, the point was made known when Mpande ordered that the shields to be made from the hide would have the best side used for Mbuyazi. An inDuna pointed out to Mpande that this meant he was renouncing Cetshwayo as rightful heir. Mpande retorted that when he was a commoner he had fathered Mbuyazi on behalf of Shaka, and that now as king the significance of that birth would be recognized by being Mpande's successor. The public consequences of that action were realized when Mpande ordered Mbuyazi to move his supporters, the iziGqoza faction, to the south of the Mhlathuze River, the area that Cetshwayo, as the first son, had occupied with his followers, the uSuthu faction.

In 1856, Mpande granted Mbuyazi land just north of the lower Tugela River on the border of Natal, in the hope that his alliance with the Boers there would aid Mbuyazi in the conflict with Cetshwayo. Mbuyazi set out with his followers, families and cattle, leaving the Ifafa Hills and headed south. Cetshwayo believed that it was the time to act decisively and mobilised his forces. He intended to remove this threat to his succession to the Zulu kingship, starting the Second Zulu Civil War. In response to this mobilization, in mid-November 1856 Mbuyazi and his forces fled further south toward the Tugela River and Natal, with the hope that he would receive asylum there. Cetshwayo's forces followed.

== Forces involved ==
Mbuyazi had far fewer supporters than Cetshwayo. On the advice of his father, he sought help from white settlers in Natal led by John Dunn. Dunn gathered a small group of thirty-five Natal Border Police with an additional force of about a hundred native hunters. Mbuyazi's own forces totaled 7,000 warriors. Cetshwayo was seen by many as the rightful heir, so warriors flocked to his support, which numbered between 15,000 and 20,000 men. The guns of the colonials could only help Mbuyazi up to a point, as their numbers were too few to overcome such a large enemy force, but he was not discouraged. Mbuyuzi remembered that Mpande's general Nongalaza had overcome a superior force during the Battle of Maqongqo against Dingane. Nongalaza himself joined Mbuyazi at Mpande's request.

== The battle ==
Mbuyazi's forces had their backs to the kingdom's border along the bank of the lower Tugela River, the latter filled by the seasonal rains that swelled the river into a torrent. Mbuyazi had his warriors burn a line in the grass which would serve as a marker of no further retreat as they pledged to win, and if not to die on the field.

Cetshwayo's first attack failed, giving heart to the Mbuyazi forces after they repelled it. But Cetshwayo had enough reserves for a second attack. Cetshwayo's inner circle of supporters were then sent in, along with the Mandlakazi who far outnumbered the iziGqoza. Mbuyazi's army was overwhelmed. Mbuyazi and five of his siblings were killed. Others were swept away by the river when they attempted escape. Mpande's aging general Nongalaza, barely swam to safety.

John Dunn and his forces were to the left of Mbuyazi’s and escaped by means of a boat waiting on the Natal boundary of the river; it was said that escaping Mbuyazi forces were refused a place on the boat. Very quickly, the battle turned into the slaughter of all Mbuyazi’s surviving followers.

== Aftermath ==
In the aftermath of the battle the uSuthu faction slaughtered, with their assegais, every iziGqoza they could find, including the women and children. The justification for this act was that women bore warriors and children grow up. It is estimated that 20,000 people were killed and the mouth of the Tugela river where the bodies washed up began to be referred to as the Mathambo ("place of bones")

John Dunn later negotiated with Cetshwayo for the return of settler property captured after the battle. He later became an important advisor to Cetshwayo and an influential intermediary between the Zulus, Boers and British.

Mpande was inconsolable and resentful, and when Cetshwayo presented all the captured iziGqoza cattle to his father, Mpande refused and ordered Cetshwayo to leave. He left without any retaliation to the rejection and bided his time until the natural death of his father in 1872. Cetshwayo was crowned king by Theophilus Shepstone on 1 September 1873.

== See also ==
- Child of Storm (a novel)

== Sources ==
- Taylor, Stephen (1994) Shaka’s Children. Harper Collins London.
- Knight, Ian (1989) The Zulus. Osprey, London.
