= Bertram Mitford (novelist) =

English writer (1855–1914)

Bertram Mitford FRGS (13 June 1855 – 4 October 1914) was an English colonial writer, novelist, essayist and cultural critic who wrote forty-four books, most of which are set in South Africa.

He was a contemporary of H. Rider Haggard. A member of the Mitford family, he was the third son of Edward Ledwich Osbaldeston Mitford (1811–1912). The latter became the 31st Lord of the manor of Mitford in 1895 (following the death of his brother Colonel John Philip Osbaldeston Mitford) and died at Mitford Hall, Northumberland, in 1912.

Bertram Mitford was born in Bath in 1855, educated at Hurstpierpoint College in Sussex, went to southern Africa in 1874, living in Cheltenham 1881, married Zima Helen Gentle, daughter of Alfred Ebden, 9 March 1886 in Brighton, had daughter Yseulte Helen 3 June 1887 (died July 1969), had son Roland Bertram 17 June 1891 (died 16 April 1932), living in London 1891, and died in Cowfold, Sussex of liver disease in 1914.

He belonged to four London clubs: Junior Athenaeum, Savage, New Vagabond, and Wigwam.

== Partial bibliography ==
- Our Arms in Zululand – 1881 (poems)
- Through the Zulu Country, its Battlefields and its People – Kegan, Paul, 1883 (non-fiction)
- The Fire Trumpet – Blackett, 1889
- The Weird of Deadly Hollow – Sutton, 1891
- Golden Face – Trischler, 1892
- Tween Snow and Fire – Heinemann, 1892
- The Gun-Runner – Chatto & Windus, 1893
- The Curses of Clement Waynflete – Ward, Lock, 1894
- The King's Assegai – Chatto & Windus, 1894
- The Luck of Gerard Ridgeley – Chatto & Windus, 1894
- Renshaw Fanning's Quest – Chatto & Windus, 1894
- The White Shield – Cassell, 1895
- A Veldt Official – Ward, Lock, 1895
- The Sign of the Spider – Methuen, 1896
- The Expiation of Wynne Palliser – Ward, Lock, 1896
- Fordham's Feud – Ward, Lock, 1897
- The Induna's Wife – F. V. White, 1898
- The Ruby Sword – F. V. White, 1899
- Aletta – F. V. White, 1900
- John Ames, Native Commissioner – F. V. White, 1900
- The Triumph of Hilary Blachland – Chatto & Windus, 1901
- The Word of the Sorceress – Hutchinson, 1902
- A Veldt Vendetta – Ward, Lock, 1903
- Dorrien of Cranston – Hurst, 1903
- Forging the Blades – Nash, 1903
- Haviland's Chum – Chatto & Windus, 1903
- In the Whirl of the Rising – Methuen, 1904
- The Red Derelict – Methuen, 1904
- The Sirdar's Oath – F. V. White, 1904
- A Frontier Mystery – F. V. White, 1905
- A Secret of the Lebombo – Hurst, 1905
- Harley Greenoak's Charge – Chatto & Windus, 1906
- The White Hand and the Black – John Long, 1907
- A Legacy of the Granite Hills – John Long, 1909
- A Border Scourge – John Long, 1910
- A Duel Resurrection – Ward, Lock, 1910
- Ravenshaw of Rietholme – Ward, Lock, 1910
- The Heath Hover Mystery – Ward, Lock, 1911
- The River of Unrest – Ward, Lock, 1912
- Seaford's Snake – Ward, Lock, 1912
- Selmin of Selmingfold – Ward, Lock, 1912
- Averno – Ward, Lock, 1913
- An Island of Eden – Ward, Lock, 1913
