= Dinuzulu KaCetshwayo =

King of the Zulu nation

Dinuzulu kaCetshwayo
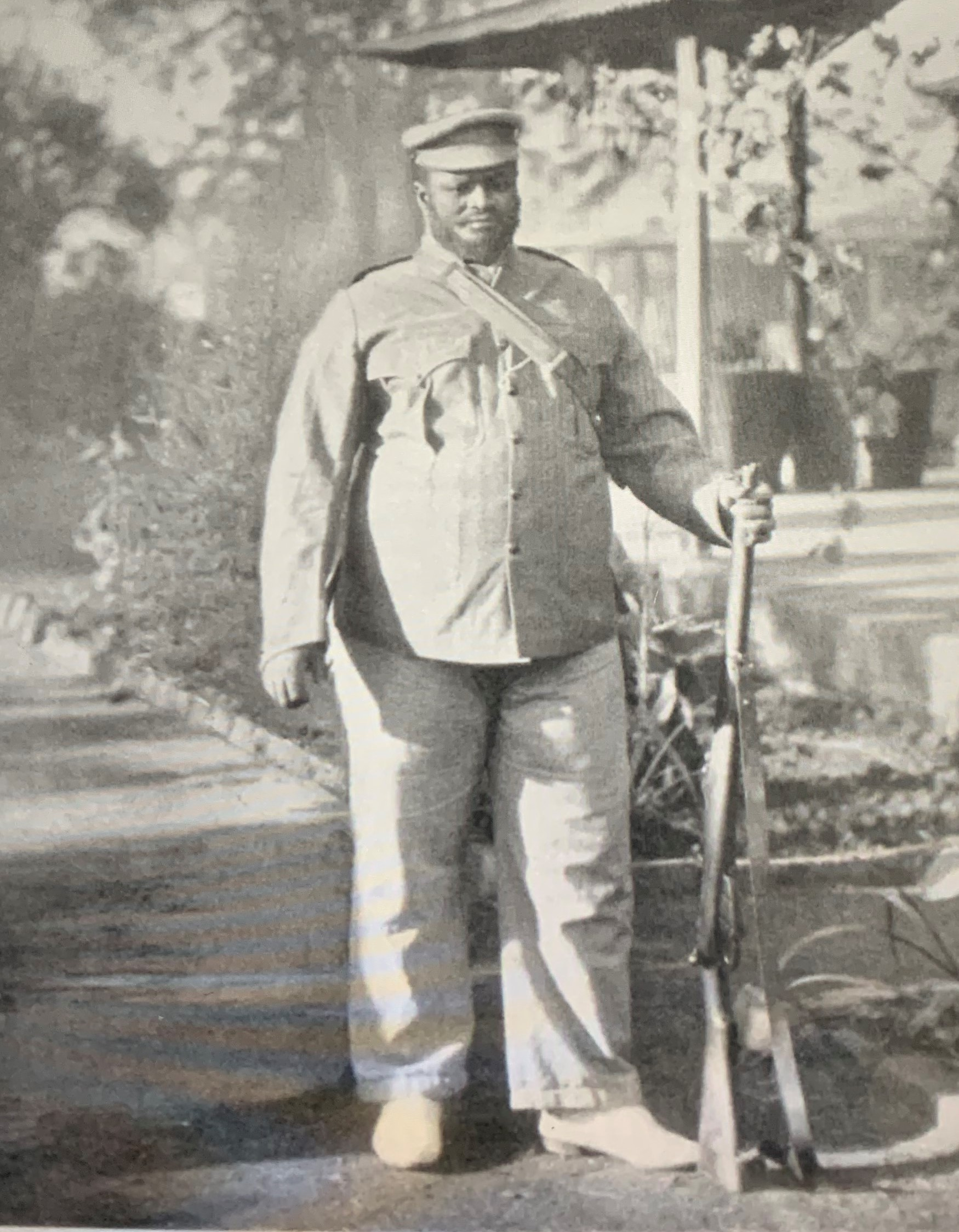
- Dinuzulu in military uniform, South Africa, c. 1888–1913

King of the Zulu Nation
- Reign: 20 May 1884 – 18 October 1913
- Predecessor: Cetshwayo kaMpande
- Successor: Solomon kaDinuzulu
- Born: 1868
- Died: 18 October 1913 (aged 45); Transvaal, Union of South Africa
- Burial: KwaNobamba, South Africa
- Spouse: uNdlunkulu okaKhumalo (waseNsindeni)
- House: House of Zulu
- Religion: Zulu traditional religion Anglican Church

Dinuzulu kaCetshwayo (c. 1868 – 18 October 1913, commonly misspelled Dinizulu) was the king of the Zulu nation from 20 May 1884 until his death in 1913. He succeeded his father Cetshwayo, who was the last king of the Zulus to be officially recognised as such by the British. Zululand had been broken up into thirteen smaller territories by the British government after the Anglo-Zulu War, and Cetshwayo, and subsequently Dinuzulu, administered one of them. The British later realised the futility of breaking up Zululand into the territories and restored Cetshwayo as paramount leader of the territories. However, they left one of Cetshwayo's relatives, Usibepu (Zibhebhu), alone with his lands intact. On 22 July 1883, Usibepu attacked Cetshwayo's new kraal in Ulundi, wounding the king and causing him to flee to Eshowe.

== Dinuzulu's volunteers ==
To contest the succession, Dinuzulu first appealed to the British, but received no response. He then offered rewards of land to Boer farmers of the Vryheid and Utrecht districts, to come and fight on his side and restore the Zulu Kingdom. In 1884 a group of Boer farmers from the districts of Utrecht and Vryheid undertook to help restore order, in return for land for the formation of an independent republic with access to the sea. Led by General Louis Botha, they formed Dinuzulu's Volunteers and after several clashes with Zibhebhu, defeated him at the Battle of Ghost Mountain (also known as the Battle of Tshaneni) on 5 June 1884.

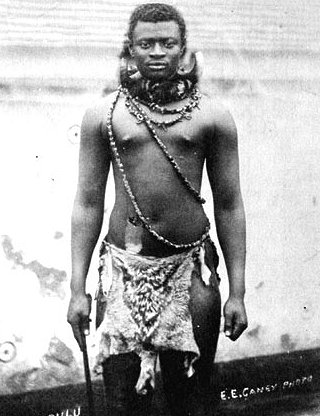
Photo of Dinuzulu, c. 1883

The Nieuwe Republiek, established in northern Natal on land awarded to Boers by Dinuzulu, was recognized by Germany and Portugal. It was later incorporated on its request by the ZAR because of financial problems, after the British annexed the coastal plains from the Thukela river (Tugela) northwards in order to prevent the Boers from building a harbour. After considerable dispute in a Natal arbitration court, Britain eventually recognized the New Republic, but reduced it in size after annexing the coastal plains to the Cape Colony, along with the republic's claims to St Lucia for a harbor. The Niewe Republiek was incorporated on its own request with the Zuid Afrikaanse Republiek in 1888. No major conflict would occur in the region until the outbreak of the Second Boer War in 1899.

== Exile ==
In 1890 Dinuzulu was captured by the British and exiled to the island of Saint Helena for seven years, for leading a Zulu army against the British due to annexation of the coastal plains of Zululand. During his exile, Dinuzulu was initially held at Rosemary Hall in St. Pauls, and later moved to Maldivia in upper Jamestown, and finally to Francis Plain House in St. Pauls. He was allowed to have an entourage of about 20 people, including two of his wives, his uncles, a doctor, and translators. Despite the circumstances, Dinuzulu engaged with the local community, learned to write, and even played the piano and organ.

When Zululand was formally incorporated into Natal in 1897, Dinuzulu was released. The following year he was installed as the British government's InDuna.

== Bambatha rebellion ==
In 1906 the so-called Bambatha rebellion broke out. After the rebellion had been put down, Dinuzulu was accused of giving orders to Bambatha to start the rebellion and was put on trial for treason. Although he steadfastly protested his innocence, he was found guilty and sentenced to four years imprisonment in March, 1908.

Two years later an old friend of his, General Louis Botha, became Prime Minister of the Union of South Africa. Botha ordered that Dinuzulu be released and transported to the farm Uitkyk in the Transvaal, where he died on 18 October 1913 at the age of 44 or 45. After a state funeral, he was buried at Nobamba in the Khosini Valley (31°16'E; 28°26'S), which lies in the upper White Umfolozi drainage system. He was succeeded by his son Solomon kaDinuzulu.

== Statue ==
A statue of Dinuzulu has been erected next to the statue of General Louis Botha, the first prime minister of the Transvaal colony, at the corner of Berea Road and Warwick Avenue in Durban.

== Wood Badge beads ==
Beads from Dinuzulu's necklace—claimed to have been found by Robert Baden-Powell—were later presented to Scout leaders following Wood Badge leadership training. Today the Wood Badge beads are replicas of the original beads. To date, there is conflicting evidence as to how Baden-Powell came upon the beads as well as the specific purpose and owner of the beads. Alternative stories include that Baden-Powell took the beads improperly, and that the beads were not war beads but actually belonged to a woman, such as a wife of Dinuzulu.

Regnal titles
Preceded by Cetshwayo	King of the Zulu Nation; 1884–1913	Succeeded by Solomon kaDinuzulu
