= Usuthu =

The uSuthu were the royalist faction in Zululand, more specifically they were the followers of Cetshwayo kaMpande. The young Zulu warriors who clustered around prince Cetshwayo in 1856 during the Second Zulu Civil War formed the core of the uSuthu. Their name came from the Zulu war cry usuthu.

After King Cetshwayo kaMpande was deposed by the British in the Anglo-Zulu War of 1879, the First Partition of Zululand resulted in thirteen separate chiefdoms, none of which were ruled by King Cetshwayo kaMpande, the former and subsequent Zulu king. The uSuthu resented this "divide and conquer" strategy of the British, and sought to re-establish the monarchy, resulting in the Third Zulu Civil War of 1883–1884 (Mandlakazi-uSuthu Conflict), and the uSuthu Rebellion of 1888.

The British sought to dismantle the uSuthu chieftaincy.
