= Theophilus Shepstone =

British South African statesman

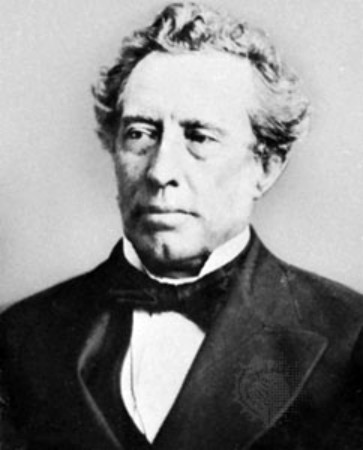
Theophilus Shepstone

Sir Theophilus Shepstone KCMG (8 January 1817 – 23 June 1893) was a British South African statesman who was responsible for the annexation of the Transvaal to Britain in 1877.

== Early life ==
Theophilus Shepstone was born at Westbury-on-Trym near Bristol, England. When he was three years old his father, the Rev. William Theophilus Shepstone, emigrated to Cape Colony. Young Shepstone was educated at the native mission stations at which his father worked, and the boy acquired great proficiency in the indigenous languages of South Africa, a circumstance which determined his career. In the Xhosa War of 1835 he served as headquarters interpreter on the staff of the governor, Sir Benjamin d'Urban, and at the end of the campaign remained on the frontier as clerk to the agent for the local tribes.

== Natal ==
In 1838 he was one of the party sent from Cape Colony to occupy Port Natal on behalf of Britain. This force was recalled in 1839 when Shepstone was appointed British resident among the amaMfengu and other communities in Kaffraria. Here he remained until the definite establishment of British rule in Natal and its organisation as an administrative entity, when Shepstone was made (1845) Secretary for the Native Affairs. In 1848 he became captain-general of the native levies; in 1855 judicial assessor in native causes; and, in 1856, on the remodelling of the Natal government, secretary for native affairs and a member of the executive and legislative councils. This position he held until 1877.

Thus for over thirty years, he was the director of native policy in Natal. A man of strong will and pronounced views, he gained a great influence over the indigenous people, by whom he was called "father old man," and given the nickname "Somtseu" (a famed black hunter) by the Zulus, allegedly when he fled before an elephant, but more likely in childhood. The main line of his policy was to maintain tribal customs as far as consistent with principles of humanity, and not to attempt to force the civilisation. The result of his policy remained traceable for some time in the condition and status of the Natal peoples. While he remained in charge there was but one serious revolt—that of Langalibalele in 1873 against a demand that guns be registered.

Shepstone's influence with the Zulus was made use of by the Natal government; in 1861 he visited the Zulu Kingdom and obtained from Mpande a public recognition of Cetshwayo as his successor. Twelve years later Shepstone attended Cetshwayo's coronation, the Zulu chief promising Shepstone to live at peace with his neighbours. In 1874 and again in 1876 Shepstone travelled to London on colonial affairs.

== Transvaal ==
When in London in 1876 Shepstone was entrusted by the 4th earl of Carnarvon, then secretary of state for the colonies, with a special commission to confer with the Transvaal executive on the question of the federation of the South African states, and given power, should he deem it necessary, to annex the country, subject to the confirmation of the British government.

Shepstone went to Pretoria in January 1877, and on 12 April issued a proclamation announcing the establishment of British authority over the Transvaal. Shepstone's force consisted of twenty-five men of the Natal Mounted Police only, but no overt opposition was made to the annexation; the republic at the time was in a condition bordering on anarchy. "Nothing but annexation," wrote Sir Theophilus to the Colonial Office, "will or can save the state, and nothing else can save South Africa from the direst consequences. All the thinking and intelligent people know this, and will be thankful to be delivered from the thraldom of petty factions by which they are perpetually kept in a state of excitement and unrest because the government and everything connected with it is a thorough sham" (Martineau's Life of Sir Bartle Frere, ch. 18). Shepstone's action has been condemned as premature. He had, however, reason to believe that if Britain remained inactive, Germany would be induced to undertake the protection of the Transvaal.

Moreover, had the policy of self-government for the Boers which he outlined in his annexation proclamation been carried out, the revolt of 1880–81 might not have occurred. Shepstone remained in Pretoria as administrator of the Transvaal until January 1879; his rule was marked, according to Sir Bartle Frere, who described him as "a singular type of an Africander Talleyrand," by an "apparent absence of all effort to devise or substitute a better system" than that which had characterised the previous regime. Shepstone had been summoned home to advise the Colonial Office on South African affairs and he reached England in May 1879; on his return to Natal he retired (1880) from the public service. In 1883, however, he was commissioned to replace Cetshwayo as king in Zululand. He was active in church matters in Natal, and was, prior to the Langalibalele "rebellion", a close friend of Bishop Colenso. The two men, though, became estranged following Colenso's gradual realisation that Shepstone exerted a malign influence on Zulu affairs. Shepstone opposed the grant of self-government to Natal. He died at Pietermaritzburg on 23 June 1893.

Although Shepstone's life and work have at times been celebrated by Britons and South Africans, experts on the period such as South African historian Jeff Guy implicate him in building a conspiracy to promote the invasion of the Zulu kingdom and its dismemberment by forces from Natal and the Transvaal. His motive seems to have been both to fill the increasing demand for labour in Natal colony and to win back the friendship of the Transvaal government.

== Family ==
In 1833 Shepstone married Maria, daughter of Charles Palmer, commissary-general at Cape Town; they had six sons and three daughters. One of his sons, Captain George Shepstone, was killed at the Battle of Isandlwana; of the other sons H. C. Shepstone (born 1840) was secretary for native affairs in Natal from 1884 to 1893; Theophilus was adviser to the Swazis (1887–1891); and A. J. Shepstone (born 1852) served in various native expeditions, as assistant-commissioner in Zululand, in the South African War, 1899–1902, and became in 1909 secretary for native affairs (Natal) and secretary of the Natal native trust. A younger brother of Sir Theophilus, John Wesley Shepstone (born 1827), filled between 1846 and 1896 various offices in Natal in connection with the administration of native affairs.

Shepstone is the great-great-grandfather of international artist Conor Mccreedy.
