= Cetshwayo =

King of the Zulu Kingdom (1826–1884)

Cetshwayo kaMpande
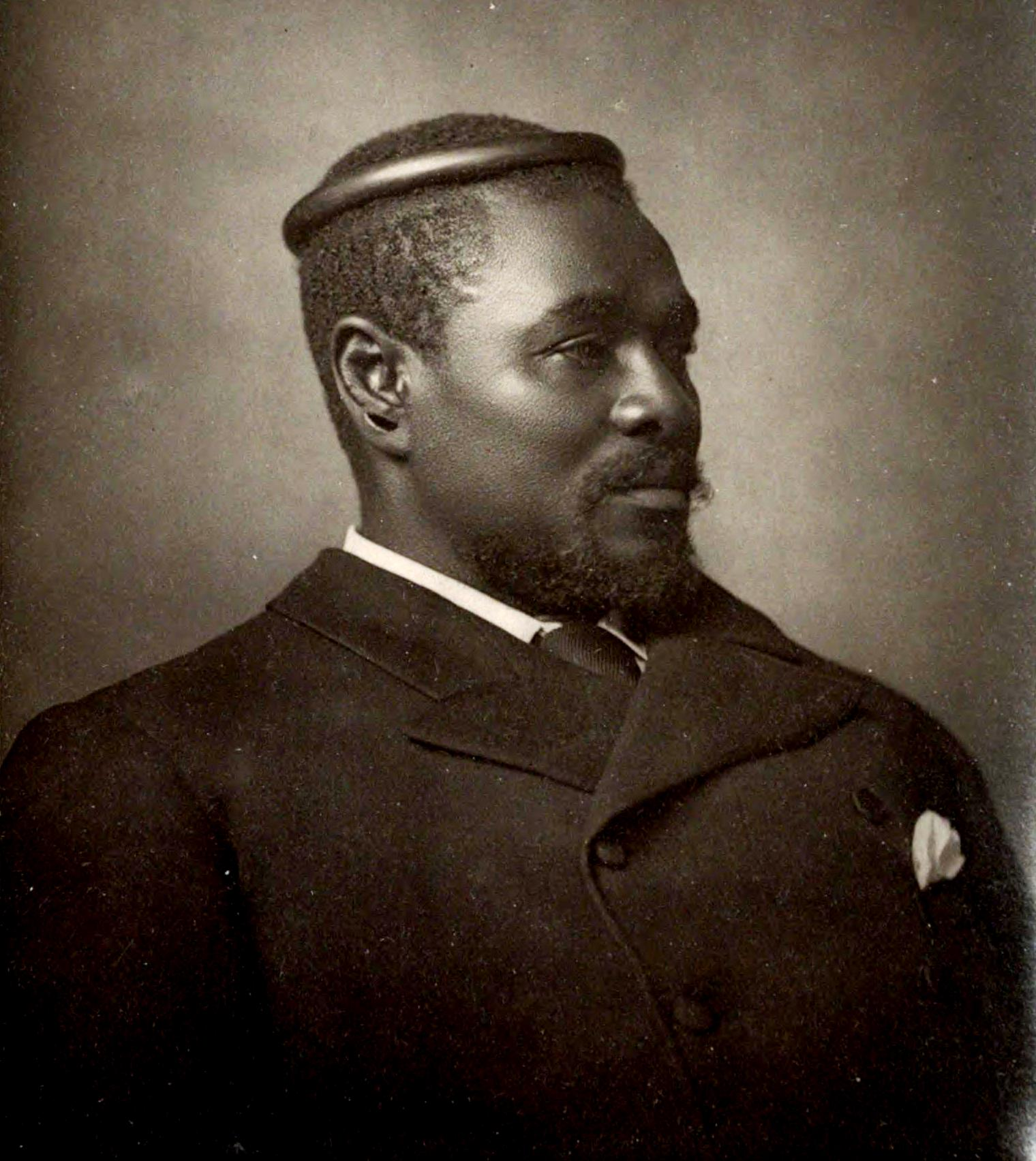
- Photograph of Cetshwayo by Alexander Bassano in Old Bond Street, London, c. 1882

King of the Zulu Nation
- Reign: 1 September 1873 – 8 February 1884
- Predecessor: Mpande kaSenzangakhona
- Successor: Dinuzulu kaCetshwayo
- Born: 1826; Eshowe, Zulu Kingdom
- Died: 8 February 1884 (aged 58); Eshowe, Zulu Kingdom
- Wives: OkaSekethwayo Mdlalose; Novimbi kaMsweli Nzimela; MaJiya; Nhlamule kaMasiphula Ntshangase; Fumutha kaQethuka Magwaza; OkaMkhayiphi; OkaMaganda
- Issue: 13 including: Dinuzulu kaCetshwayo; Kusabhede Soneni kaCetshwayo; Nyoniyentaba kaCetshwayo; Manzolwandle kaCetshwayo; Maseyana kaCetshwayo; Mkebeni kaCetshwayo; Manzolwandle kaCetshwayo; Sililo kaCetshwayo; Simiso kaCetshwayo; Bekisile kaCetshwayo; Nomandlambi kaCetshwayo; Sabede kaCetshwayo; Siyele kaCetshwayo
- House: House of Zulu
- Father: Mpande kaSenzangakhona
- Mother: Ngqubazi kaMbondi Zungu

Cetshwayo kaMpande (/kɛtʃˈwaɪ.oʊ/; Zulu pronunciation: [ᵏǀétʃwajo kámpande]; c. 1826 – 8 February 1884) was the king (Note: The title iSilo samaBandla was used for the king by the Zulu people.) of the Zulu Kingdom from 1873 to 1884 and its Commander in Chief during the Anglo-Zulu War of 1879. His name has been rendered as Cetywayo, Cetewayo or Cetshwayo. Cetshwayo consistently opposed the war, sought fruitlessly to make peace with the British, and was defeated and exiled following the Zulu defeat in the war. He was later allowed to return to Zululand, where he died in 1884.

== Early life ==
Cetshwayo kaMpande was born in 1826, the son of future Zulu king Mpande kaSenzangakhona and Queen Ngqumbazi. He was a half-nephew of the then reigning Zulu King Shaka and a grandson of Senzangakhona.

Cetshwayo was a prominent Usuthu leader the Zulu Civil War of 1856, against his younger brother Mbuyazi. Prominent trader John Robert Dunn unsuccessfully attempted to mediate the conflict, caught in the eventual Battle of Ndondakusuka on the 2nd of December 1856. Cetshwayo succeeded in defeating Mbuyazi, annihilating most of his Gqoza followers, including five of his own brothers, and the capture of nearly one thousand head of cattle from white traders who had congregated nearby. Dunn later negotiated the release of 1,200 heads of cattle in 1857 from Cetshwayo, becoming his advisor in the process.

In 1861, Mpande formerly recognised Cetshwayo as his heir. Throughout this decade, and with the advice of Dunn, Cetshwayo successfully manipulated the importation of firearms to Usuthus exclusively, enhancing his status and providing a technological edge over his rivals, many of whom also traded. As a result, the military power of his rival half-brother uHamu kaNzibe, and Zubhebhu waned.

His other brother, Umthonga, was still a potential rival. Cetshwayo also kept an eye on his father's new wives and children for potential rivals, ordering the death of his favourite wife, Nomantshali, and her children in 1861. Though two sons escaped, the youngest was murdered in front of the king. After these events Umthonga fled to the Boers' side of the border and Cetshwayo had to make deals with the Boers to get him back. In 1865, Umthonga again fled across the border, apparently making Cetshwayo believe that Umthonga would organize help from the Boers against him, the same way his father had overthrown his predecessor, Dingane.

Stories from that time regarding his huge size vary, saying he stood at least between 6 ft 6 in (198 cm) and 6 ft 8 in (203 cm) in height and weighed close to 25 stone (350 lb; 160 kg).

== Coronation ==
Mpande died of old age in 1872, his death was first concealed to ensure a smooth transition of power. Cetshwayo was acclaimed king by his izinduna in 1873 a month before the coronation. He invited Natal's Secretary for Native Affairs, Sir Theophilus Shepstone although Shepstone was aware of and annoyed by the previous tribal ceremony. Shepstone arrived with a substantial military escort including the artist Thomas Baines and had two days of discussion with Cetshwayo.

Shepstone presided over the ceremony on 1 September 1873 that crowned Cetshwayo, partly as a way to frustrate Cetshwayo's rivals but also as backing against Boer land claims. Cetshwayo restricted access to firearms to the Usuthu in the period before his Coronation due to fear of usurpation. However, at his coronation, rival chiefs uHamu kaNzibe, Zubhebhu of the Mandlakazi, and Mnyamana kaNgqengelele declared their loyalty to Cetshwayo, effectively centralising Zulu military power.

During the ceremony, Shepstone proclaimed a set of 'coronation laws,' that as well as promising to live at peace with their neighbours challenged traditional Zulu social rites, with an end to indiscriminate bloodshed in Zululand; no one to be condemned without trial or appeal to the king; no life to be taken without the king's consent; and the replacement of the death penalty with fines for minor crimes. That farcical piece of theatre had been agreed to by Cetshwayo simply to satisfy the wishes of Shepstone and meant nothing to the Zulu people, although Cetshwayo may have seen it as a way to limit the power of the great chiefs. Shepstone's motives were mixed, mixing a genuinely philanthropic desire to bring more predictable law but also to provide a pretext for future British involvement, and the apparent breaking of Cetshwayo's coronation promises would be a prominent grievance in the ultimatum that would start the war.

After his coronation, as was customary, Cetshwayo established a new capital for the nation and called it Ulundi (the high place). Cetshwayo and Dunn controlled much of the material and economic wealth in Zululand.

== Reign ==
Throughout his six year reign, Cetshwayo's popularity among Zulus is the subject of significant debate. In 1876, the King gave permission for the inDlondlo and uDolkwe Regiments to marry, leading to an exodus of young Zulu couples to Natal or the Transvaal, and some young women who remained were killed on Cetshwayo's orders.

Both he and his father were opposed to missionaries, although allowed them on occasion to court favour with colonial Natal, and the wealthy patrons of certain missionaries. However, as early as 1871, Missionaries were persecuted on the orders of Cetshwayo and he would decry the conversion of Zulus to Christianity, actively expunging Missionaries from 1877, leading to criticism from the British, and South African Church.

Cetshwayo's foreign policy prior to 1877 relied on an alliance with the British Empire in Natal, then under the authority of Shepstone. Shepstone helped bring about the annexation of the Transvaal, making it a British colony. As a result, a complex Boer-Zulu border dispute became a British-Zulu issue, affecting the previously positive British-Zulu relations.

An 1878 Boundary Commission established by Sir Harry Bulwer, then Lieutenant-Governor of Natal, investigated the boundary dispute with the cooperation of Cetshwayo. The commission established that the Boers had no right to be in Zulu land, maintaining a peaceful British-Zulu relationship. Such a finding disappointed High Commissioner to Native Affairs and Governor of Cape Colony Sir Henry Bartle-Frere, who withheld the findings of the Commission, believing incidents would occur that could justify the annexation of Zululand.

== Anglo-Zulu War ==
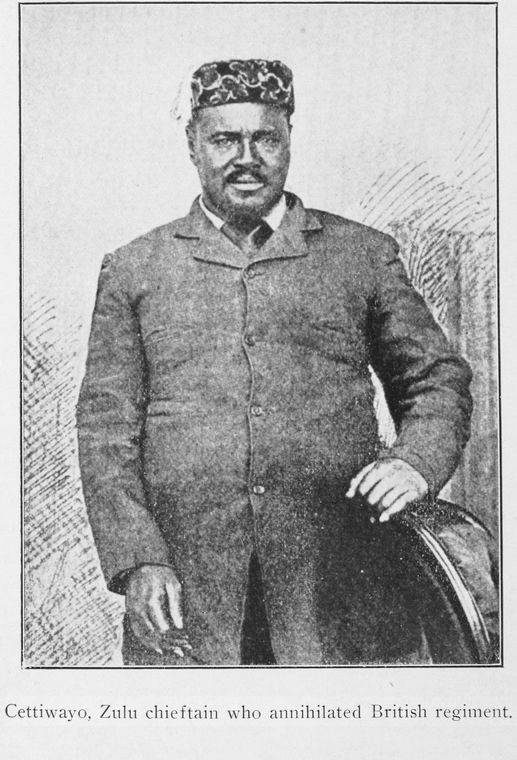
Cetshwayo (called Cettiwayo in the caption) in Cape Town, shortly after his capture in the Anglo-Zulu War

As early as August 1878 High Commissioner for Native Affairs and Governor of the Cape Colony Sir Henry Bartle Frere sought to subjugate Zululand, believing the Zulu to be an significant obstacle to the federation of South African colonies. In July 1878, the wives of minor Zulu Chief Sirayo's sons, left their husbands and sought refuge in Natal. In response, Sirayo's sons entered Natal to retrieve their wives, violating British-Zulu boundary agreements. In September 1878, two Englishmen illegally surveying Zululand were detained. In October, an ex-Swazi chief living in Zululand attacked some Swazi kraals. Sir Henry Bartle Frere presented these minor infractions as evidence of Zulu preparations for a full scale war against the British, despite Cetshwayo being unaware of them.

Bartle Frere issued an ultimatum to Cetshwayo on the 11th of December 1878, demanding the abolition of the Zulu military system within thirty days, and the payment of hundreds of cattle in compensation for misdemeanors. Such an ultimatum was impossible to meet, the rainy season impeding the collection of cattle, and the military system underpinning Zulu society. Despite Cetshwayo's attempts to collect the cattle, he was unable to meet the deadline, and Frere refused its extension despite numerous requests from the Zulu King. As a result, British forces entered Zululand on the 11th of January, 1879.

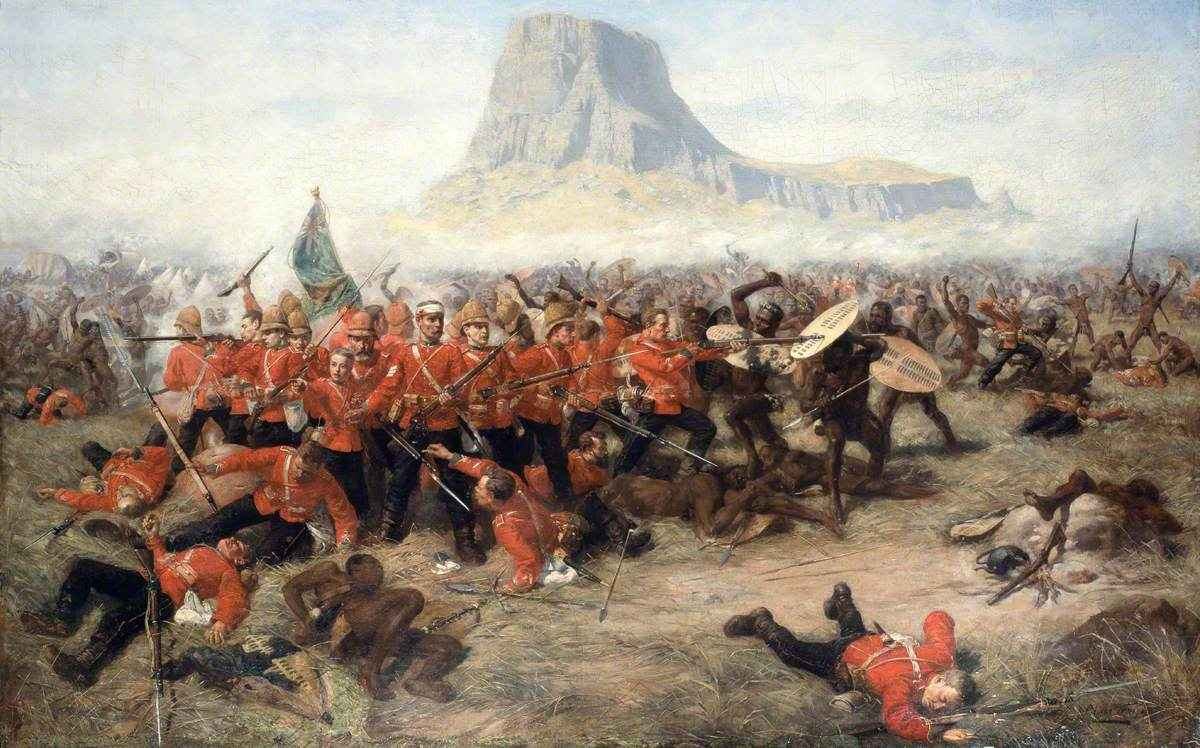
The Battle of Isandlwana

Throughout the war, Bartle Frere and Chelmsford blamed perceived aggression on the part of Cetshwayo as the cause of the conflict. Frere referred to Cetshwayo's "reign of terror," and British officials suggested that his support by Zulus was waning. Yet, Cetshwayo sought to make peace early in the war, sending messengers to intercept Chelmsford's column with requests for peace talks, the British imprisoning these messengers.

After an initial decisive but costly Zulu victory over the British at the Battle of Isandlwana and the failure of the other two columns of the three-pronged British attack to make headway – indeed, one was bogged down in the Siege of Eshowe – the British retreated, other columns suffering two further defeats to Zulu armies in the field at the Battle of Intombe and the Battle of Hlobane. However, the British follow-up victories at Rorke's Drift and Kambula prevented a total collapse of the British military positions. While this retreat presented an opportunity for a Zulu counterattack deep into Natal, Cetshwayo refused to mount such an attack; he intended to repulse the British offensive and secure a peace treaty. However, Cetshwayo's translator, a Dutch trader he had imprisoned at the start of the war named Cornelius Vijn, gave warnings to Lord Chelmsford of gathering Zulu forces during these negotiations.

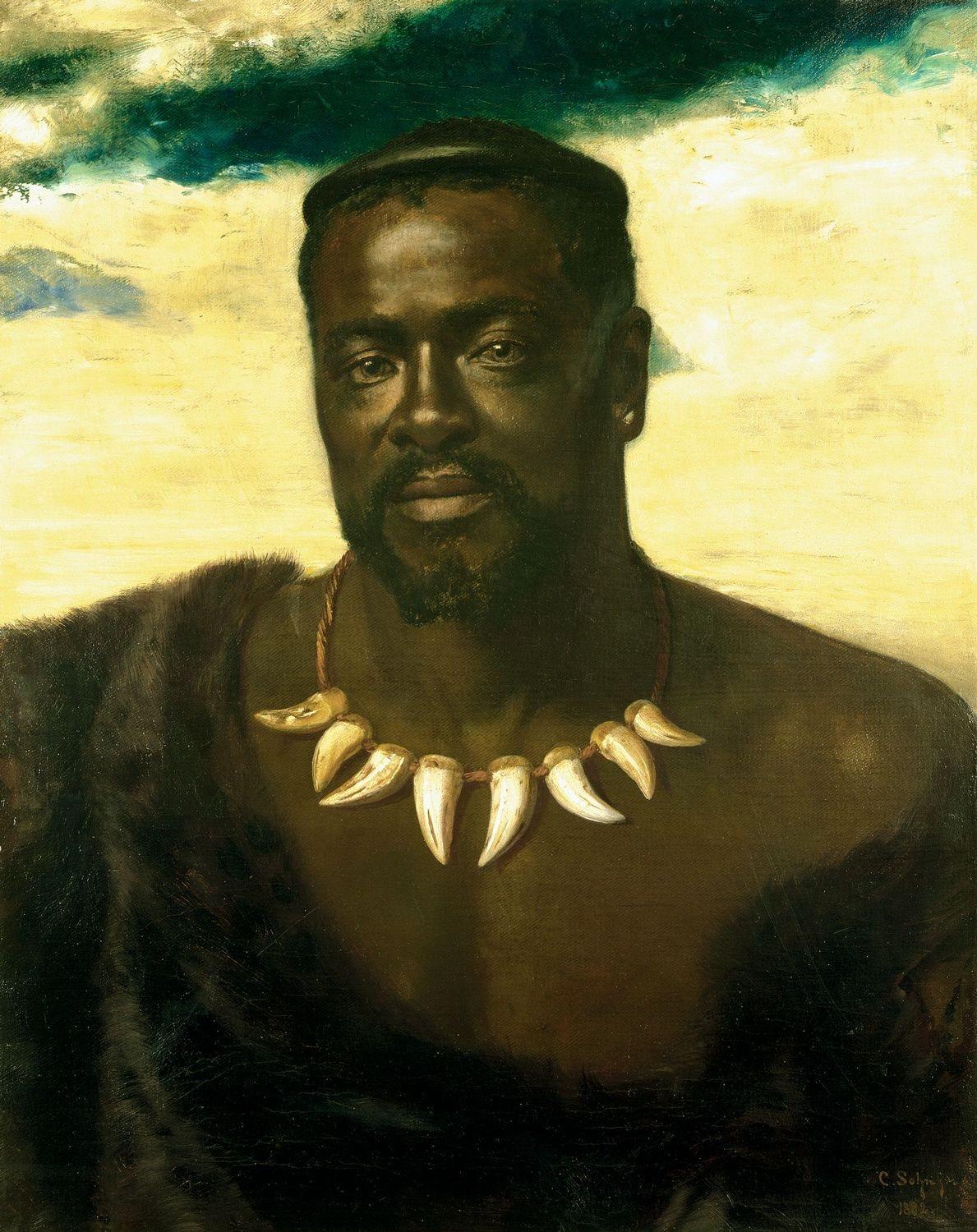
Cetshwayo visited England in 1882 when this portrait was painted by Karl Rudolf Sohn.

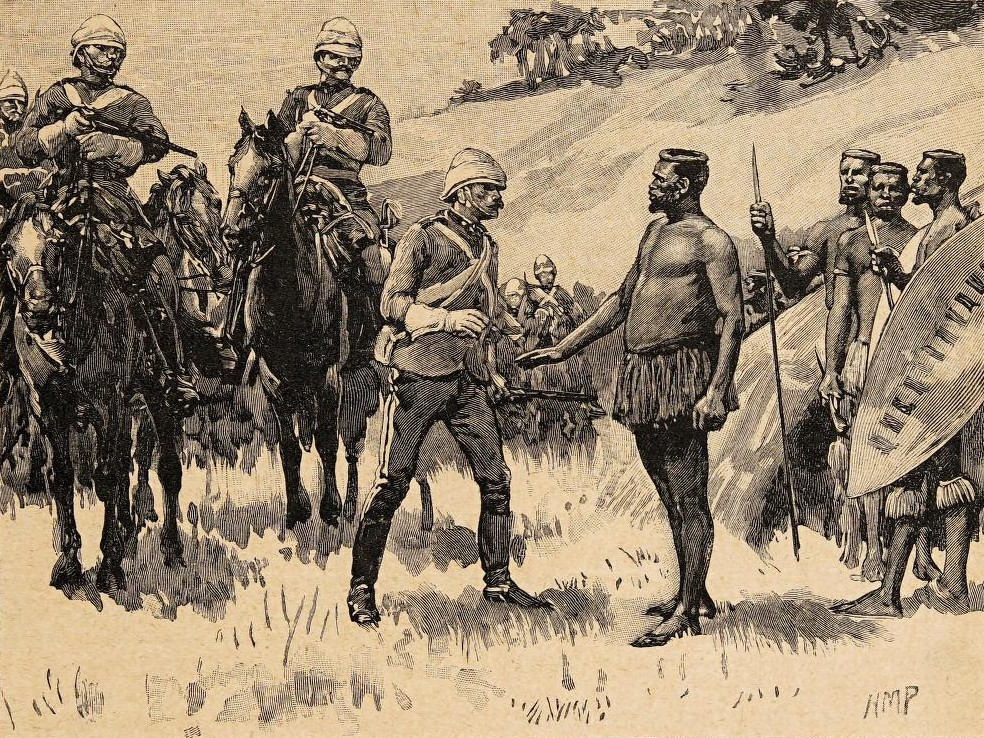
Surrender of Cetewayo in 1879

The British then returned to Zululand with a far larger and better-armed force, finally capturing the Zulu capital at the Battle of Ulundi on 4 July, in which the British, having learned their lesson from their defeat at Isandlwana, set up a hollow square on the open plain, armed with cannons and Gatling guns. The battle lasted approximately 45 minutes before the British ordered their cavalry to charge the Zulus, which routed them and took and burnt Ulundi.

Cetshwayo became a fugitive and on 28 August was captured and sent to Cape Town. It is said that scouts spotted the water-carriers of the king, distinctive because the water was carried above, not upon, their heads. His deposition was formally announced to the Zulu and Zululand was divided into thirteen chiefdoms.

== Later life ==
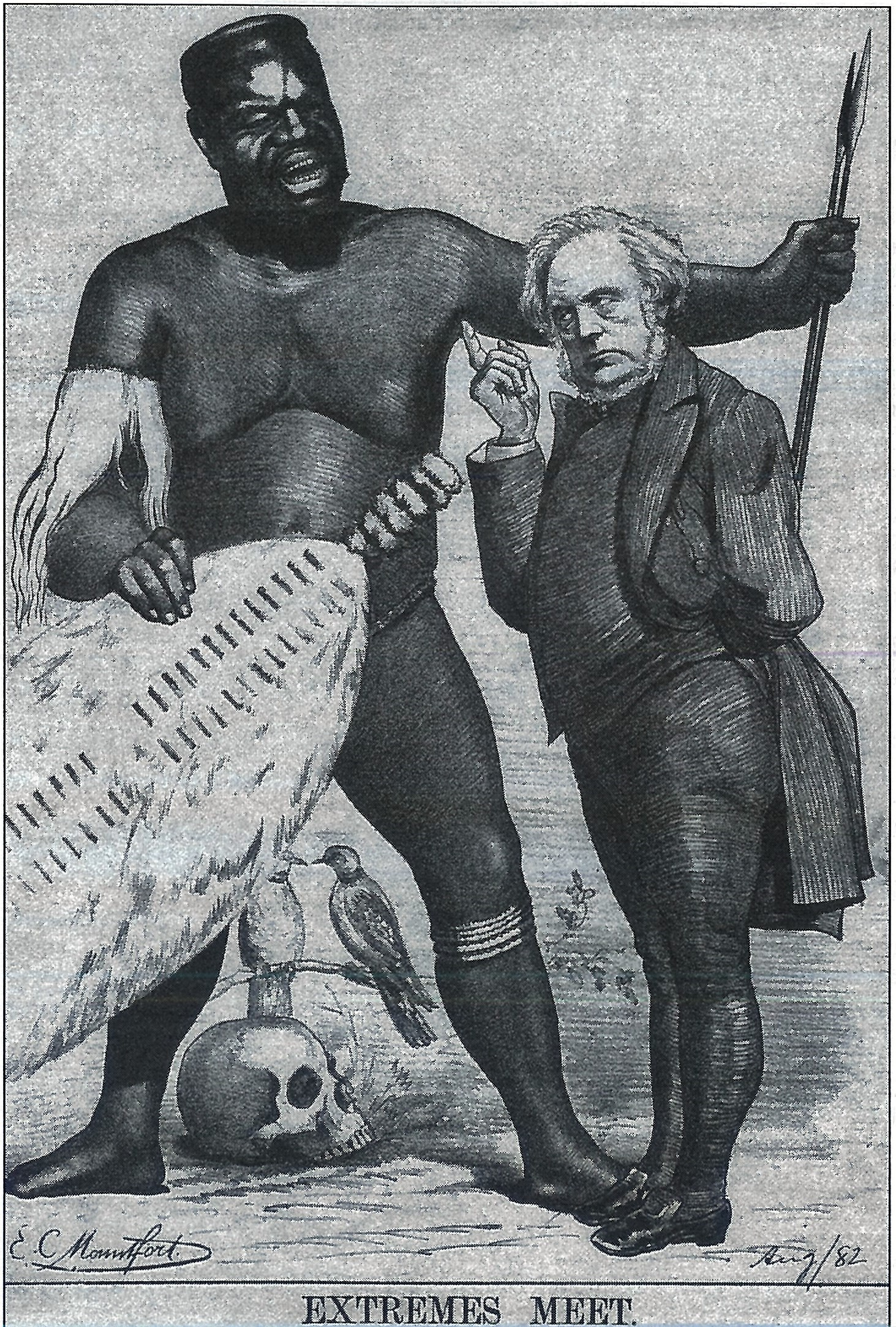
Cartoon by E. C. Mountfort of 1882, depicting Cetshwayo being lectured by the anti-imperialist MP for Birmingham, John Bright

.

From 1881, his cause had been taken up by, among others, Bishop Colenso of Natal and Lady Florence Dixie, correspondent of The Morning Post, who wrote articles and books in his support. This, along with his gentle and dignified manner, gave rise to public sympathy and the sentiment that he had been ill-used and shoddily treated by Bartle Frere and Lord Chelmsford. In 1882, Cetshwayo was allowed to visit England. He had audiences with Queen Victoria and other famous personages.

Following the conclusion of the Anglo-Zulu War he was released from Robben Island.

By 1882, differences between two Zulu factions—pro-Cetshwayo uSuthus and three rival chiefs led by Zibhebhu—had erupted into a blood feud and civil war. In 1883, the British government returned Cetshwayo to Zululand and tried to restore his rule at least part of his previous territory, but the attempt failed. With the aid of Boer mercenaries, Chief Zibhebhu started a war contesting the succession, and on 22 July 1883, he attacked Cetshwayo's new kraal in Ulundi. Cetshwayo was wounded but escaped to the forest at Nkandla. Two months later, the King was treated for 'A Rare Foreign Body in the Eye,' a live tick that had attached itself to his cornea.

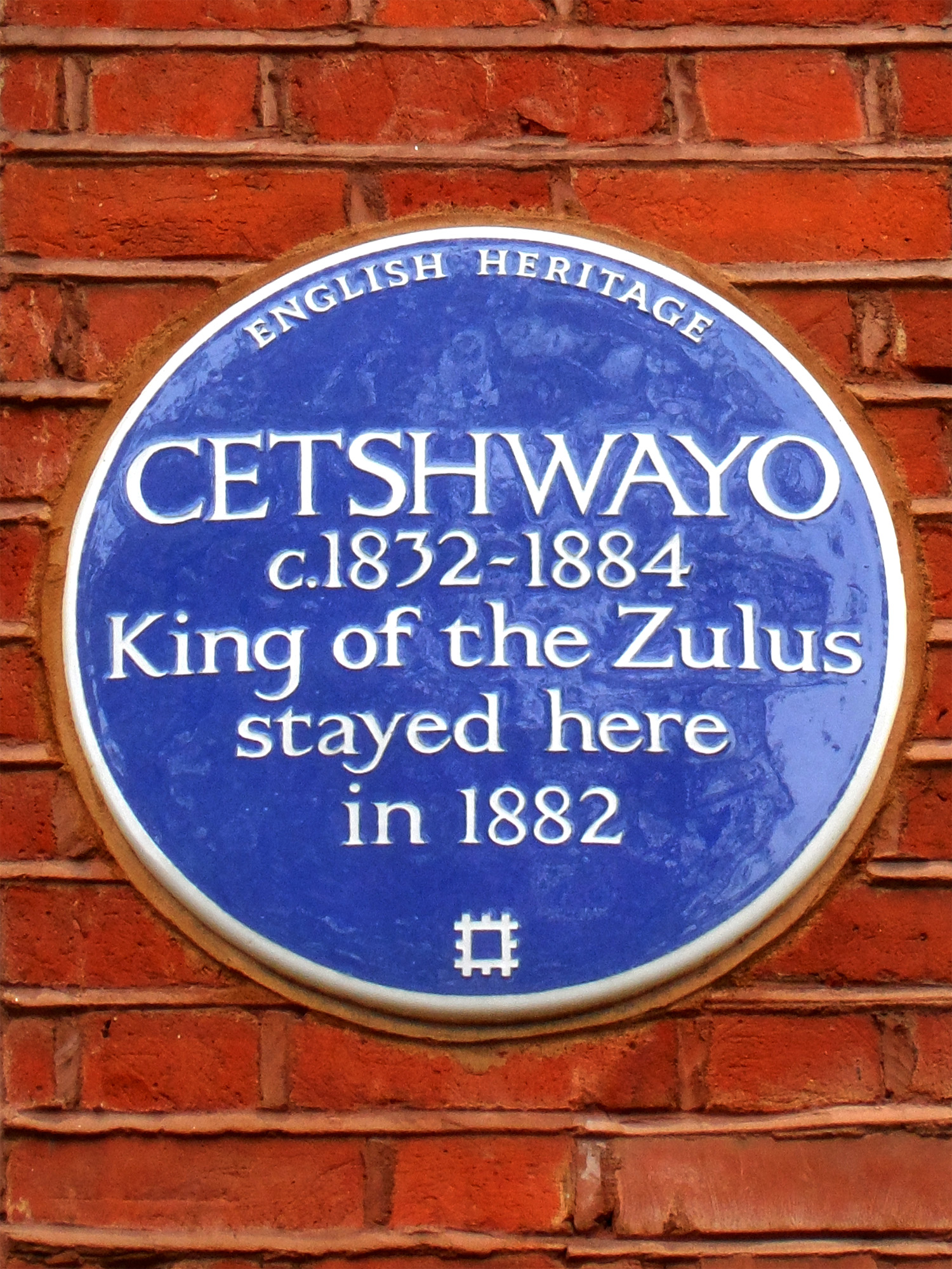
Cetshwayo Blue Plaque at 18 Melbury Road in Kensington, London

After pleas from the Resident Commissioner, Sir Melmoth Osborne, Cetshwayo moved to Eshowe, where he died a few months later on 8 February 1884, presumably from a heart attack, although there are some theories that he may have been poisoned. His body was buried in a field within sight of the forest, to the south near Nkunzane River. The remains of the wagon that carried his corpse to the site were placed on the grave and may be seen at Ondini Museum, near Ulundi.

Cetshwayo's most prominent role in South African historiography is being the last independent king of the Zulu Kingdom. His son Dinuzulu, as heir to the throne, was proclaimed king on 20 May 1884, supported by (other) Boer mercenaries. A blue plaque commemorates Cetshwayo at 18 Melbury Road, Kensington, London.

== Legacy ==
In 2016, the King Cetshwayo District Municipality was named after Cetshwayo.

=== In Literature ===
Cetshwayo figures in three adventure novels by H. Rider Haggard: The Witch's Head (1885), Black Heart and White Heart (1900) and Finished (1917), and in his non-fiction book Cetywayo and His White Neighbours (1882). He is mentioned in John Buchan's novel Prester John. In the short story A Municipal Report in Strictly Business by O. Henry (1910), the face of a key character is compared to that of "King Cettiwayo".

Cetshwayo is a prominent character in George Bernard Shaw's novel Cashel Byron's Profession.

There is a brief allusion made to Cetshwayo in the novel Age of Iron by J. M. Coetzee in the line "The new Africans, pot-bellied, heavy-jowled men on their stools of office: Cetshwayo, Dingane in white skins."

A character in the opera Leo, the Royal Cadet by Oscar Ferdinand Telgmann and George Frederick Cameron was named in his honour in 1889.

=== In Film ===
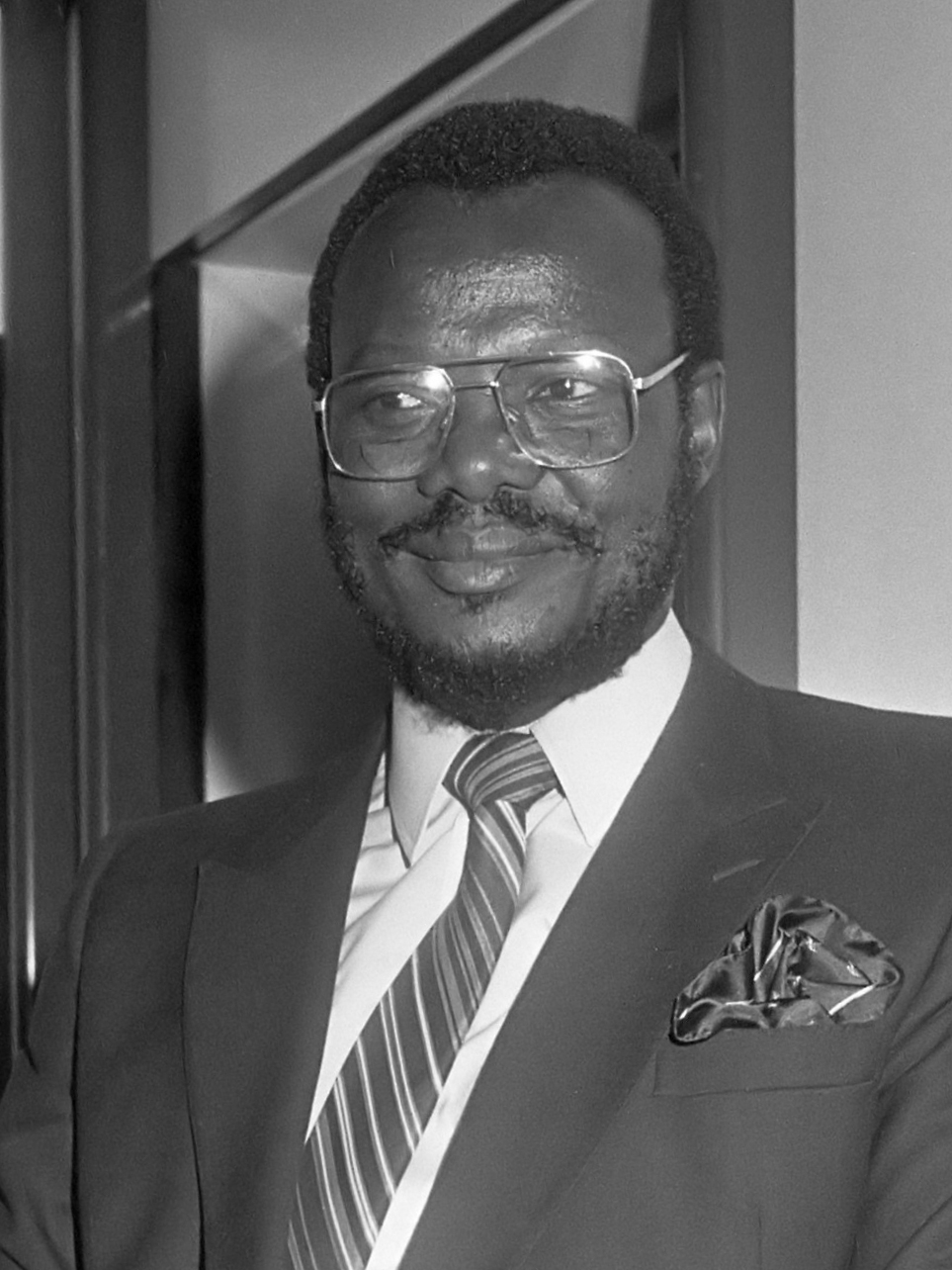
Mangosuthu Buthelezi.

In the 1964 film Zulu which depicted the Battle of Rorke's Drift, Cetshwayo was played by Mangosuthu Buthelezi, his maternal great-grandson and the future leader of the Inkatha Freedom Party. In the 1979 film Zulu Dawn depicting the Battle of Isandlwana, he was played by Simon Sabela.

In the 1986 miniseries Shaka Zulu, he was played by Sokesimbone Kubheka.

Civilization V: Brave New World features Cetshwayo as the leader of the Zulus in the Scramble for Africa scenario.

Regnal titles
Preceded by Mpande	King of the Zulu Nation; 1872–1879; 1883–1884	Succeeded by Dinuzulu
