= Mahlabatini =

- Location within KwaZulu-Natal Location within South Africa
- Coordinates: 28°15′S 31°26′E
- Country: South Africa
- Province: KwaZulu-Natal
- District: Zululand
- Municipality: Ulundi

Area
  - Total: 8.94 km^{2} (3.45 sq mi)

Population (2011)
  - Total: 1,511
  - Density: 169/km^{2} (438/sq mi)

Racial makeup (2011)
  - Black African: 98.4%
  - Coloured: 0.7%
  - Indian/Asian: 0.1%
  - White: 0.6%
  - Other: 0.2%

First languages (2011)
  - Zulu: 96.7%
  - Other: 3.3%
- Time zone: UTC+2 (SAST)
- PO box: 3865
- Area code: 035

Mahlabatini is a small town in KwaZulu-Natal, South Africa. It was established in 1898 by the British.

Village 48 km south-west of Nongoma. Established as a Norwegian mission station, it became the seat of magistracy of the Mahlabatini district. The name is Zulu, said to mean ‘country of white, sandy soil’. Known locally as Mashona, situated on the Mashona Engashoni Ridge.

Neighbouring localities include Ulundi (10 km); Melmoth (55 km); Nongoma (53 km); Hlabisa (99 km).
