= Ulundi Local Municipality =

Ulundi
- Local municipality
- Seal

- Location of Ulundi Local Municipality within KwaZulu-Natal
- Coordinates: 28°19′S 31°25′E
- Country: South Africa
- Province: KwaZulu-Natal
- District: Zululand
- Seat: Ulundi
- Wards: 25

Government
  - Type: Municipal council
  - Mayor: (IFP)

Area
  - Total: 3,250 km^{2} (1,250 sq mi)

Population (2022)
  - Total: 221,977
  - Density: 68.3/km^{2} (177/sq mi)

Racial makeup (2011)
  - Black African: 99.5%
  - Coloured: 0.1%
  - Indian/Asian: 0.1%
  - White: 0.2%

First languages (2011)
  - Zulu: 95.9%
  - English: 1.3%
  - Southern Ndebele: 1.1%
  - Other: 1.7%
- Time zone: UTC+2 (SAST)
- Municipal code: KZN266

Ulundi Municipality (Zulu: UMasipala wasoLundi) is a local municipality within the southern part of the Zululand District Municipality, in the KwaZulu-Natal province of South Africa. It is a mainly rural municipality, and its seat is Ulundi.

== Population characteristics ==
Recent surveys have identified the following characteristics of the municipality's population:

More than half the population is younger than 19 years of age, placing pressure on the need for social facilities. A significant number of these children will be orphaned due to HIV/AIDS.

At least 12% of the population (27 450 people) are already infected with HIV/AIDS. Population growth is expected to decline over the next 20 years.

Education levels are very low; 29% of the population has no formal education.

Income levels are very low; nearly 40% of households have no income. Unemployment levels are very high, with only 12.5% of the total population being formally employed.

The population is predominantly Zulu in ethnicity and culture.

== Places of interest ==
The tourism potential of the area remains largely undeveloped; however, the area features a number of activities and places of interest. These include game reserves, historical/cultural sites, cultural events and guest lodges. Game reserves include the Hluhluwe-Umfolozi Parks, Babanango Game Reserve, the Ophathe Game Park, the Emakhosini (Valley of the Zulu Kings), the planned Emakhosini-Ophathe Conservancy, and the ThakaZulu Game Reserve. Historical/cultural sites include Nodwengu (King Mpande’s residence and grave), Ulundi Battlefield, Amafa and Dingaan Stat/Piet Retief’s grave.

== Main places ==
The 2001 census divided the municipality into the following main places:

| Place | Code | Area (km^{2}) | Population |
|---|---|---|---|
| Babanango | 53101 | 6.54 | 1,297 |
| Buthelezi Empithimpithini | 53102 | 464.49 | 49,553 |
| Inhlazatshe | 53103 | 13.60 | 1,214 |
| Kwazunyawo | 53104 | 5.91 | 1,298 |
| Mahlabatini | 53105 | 8.21 | 2,342 |
| Mbatha | 53106 | 124.05 | 9,954 |
| Mpungose | 53107 | 158.64 | 27,726 |
| Ndebele | 53108 | 93.44 | 14,799 |
| Nobamba | 53109 | 684.56 | 41,286 |
| Simelane | 53110 | 3.48 | 501 |
| Ulundi | 53111 | 10.27 | 18,420 |
| Ximba | 53112 | 298.34 | 19,330 |
| Zungu | 53113 | 321.98 | 17,228 |
| Remainder of the municipality | 53114 | 1,561.36 | 8,017 |

== Politics ==
The municipal council consists of forty-nine members elected by mixed-member proportional representation. Twenty-five councillors are elected by first-past-the-post voting in twenty-five wards, while the remaining twenty-four are chosen from party lists so that the total number of party representatives is proportional to the number of votes received.

In the election of 4 November 2026 the Inkatha Freedom Party (IFP) retained its majority on the council, winning 36 seats.

The following table shows the results of the election.

| Party | Ward | | | List | | | Total seats |
| Party | Votes | % | Seats | Votes | % | Seats | Total seats |
|---|---|---|---|---|---|---|---|
| Inkatha Freedom Party | 35,101 | 72.46 | 25 | 35,229 | 72.87 | 11 | 36 |
| uMkhonto weSizwe Party | 4,828 | 9.97 | 0 | 4,995 | 10.33 | 5 | 5 |
| African National Congress | 3,409 | 7.04 | 0 | 3,235 | 6.69 | 3 | 3 |
| National Freedom Party | 1,727 | 3.57 | 0 | 1,690 | 3.50 | 2 | 2 |
| Economic Freedom Fighters | 1,180 | 2.44 | 0 | 1,061 | 2.19 | 1 | 1 |
| National Peoples Ambassadors | 1,076 | 2.22 | 0 | 907 | 1.88 | 1 | 1 |
| Democratic Alliance | 399 | 0.82 | 0 | 429 | 0.89 | 1 | 1 |
| 8 other parties | 721 | 1.49 | 0 | 798 | 1.65 | 0 | 0 |
| Total | 48,441 | 100.00 | 25 | 48,344 | 100.00 | 24 | 49 |
| Valid votes | 48,441 | 98.93 | | 48,344 | 98.90 | | |
| Invalid/blank votes | 525 | 1.07 | | 537 | 1.10 | | |
| Total votes | 48,966 | 100.00 | | 48,881 | 100.00 | | |
| Registered voters/turnout | 103,674 | 47.23 | | 103,674 | 47.15 | | |
