= Tamboekiesdraai =

- Location within KwaZulu-Natal Location within South Africa
- Coordinates: 27.394°S 31.040°E
- Country: South Africa
- Province: KwaZulu-Natal
- District: Zululand
- Municipality: eDumbe

Area
  - Total: 5.11 km^{2} (1.97 sq mi)

Population (2011)
  - Total: 442
  - Density: 86.5/km^{2} (224/sq mi)

Racial makeup (2011)
  - Black African: 99.5%
  - Indian/Asian: 0.2%
  - White: 0.2%

First languages (2011)
  - Zulu: 98.0%
  - Other: 2.0%
- Time zone: UTC+2 (SAST)

Tamboekiesdraai is a town in Zululand District Municipality in the KwaZulu-Natal province of South Africa. The town had a population of 442 in 2011.
