= Eersteling =

- Location within KwaZulu-Natal Location within South Africa
- Coordinates: 27.446°S 31.074°E
- Country: South Africa
- Province: KwaZulu-Natal
- District: Zululand
- Municipality: eDumbe

Area
  - Total: 5.28 km^{2} (2.04 sq mi)

Population (2011)
  - Total: 992
  - Density: 188/km^{2} (487/sq mi)

Racial makeup (2011)
  - Black African: 99.9%
  - Indian/Asian: 0.1%

First languages (2011)
  - Zulu: 97.8%
  - English: 1.3%
  - Other: 0.9%
- Time zone: UTC+2 (SAST)

Eersteling is a town in Zululand District Municipality in the KwaZulu-Natal province of South Africa. According to the 2011 Census, Eersteling has a population of 992, almost entirely Black African, with the vast majority speaking Zulu as their first language. It is part of the eDumbe Local Municipality in the Zululand District.
