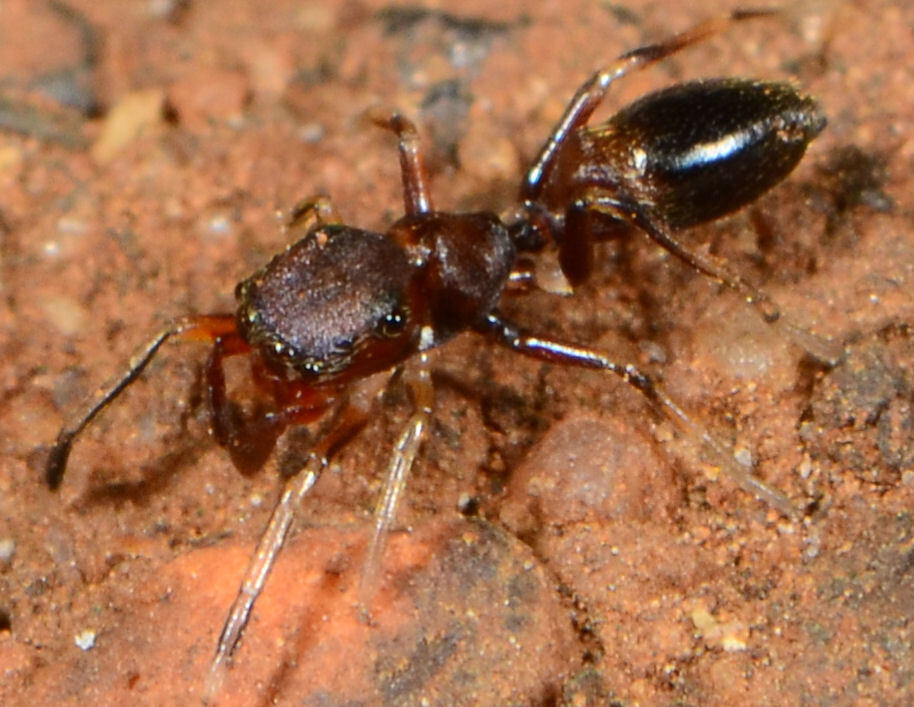
- female
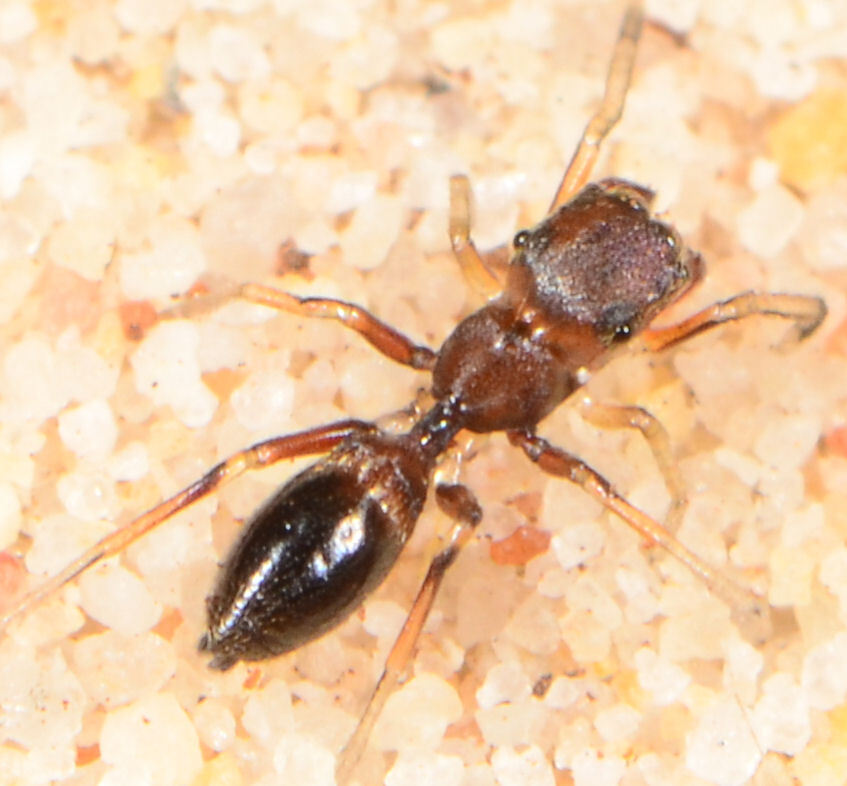
- female

Conservation status
- Least Concern (IUCN 3.1)

Scientific classification
- Kingdom: Animalia
- Phylum: Arthropoda
- Subphylum: Chelicerata
- Class: Arachnida
- Order: Araneae
- Infraorder: Araneomorphae
- Family: Salticidae
- Genus: Belippo
- Species: B. meridionalis

Binomial name
- Belippo meridionalis Wesołowska & Haddad, 2013

= Belippo meridionalis =

Ophathe Belippo Jumping Spider

Species of spider

Belippo meridionalis, the Ophathe Belippo Jumping Spider, is a jumping spider species that lives in South Africa. A member of the genus Belippo, the spider is small, with a cephalothorax that is between 1.5 and 1.8 mm (0.06 and 0.07 in) long and an abdomen between 16 mm (0.63 in) and 1,8 mm long. The female is generally lighter than the male, both resembling ants of the genus Crematogaster. The male can be distinguished from other members of the genus by the arrangement of its teeth in its chelicerae. Unlike most other Belippo spiders, Belippo meridionalis has no teeth at the front and two at the back. It also has a spur that protrudes from the side of its chelicerae. The female has four teeth on the front and five on the back. It can be distinguished by its epigyne, the external part of its copulatory organs, which lacks the pouches that can be seen on other species. Internally, it has very long membranous semination ducts and spherical spermathecae.

== Taxonomy ==
Belippo meridionalis is a species of jumping spider, a member of the family Salticidae, that was first described by the arachnologists Wanda Wesołowska and Charles Haddad in 2013. They assigned the species to the genus Belippo, first circumscribed by Eugène Simon in 1910. The specific name is a Latin word that can be translated 'southern', which relates to the fact that the spider is generally found in more southerly locations than other members of the genus. It is known as the Ophathe Belippo Jumping Spider.

In Wayne Maddison's 2015 study of spider phylogenetic classification, the genus Belippo was allocated to the tribe Myrmarachnini, named by Eugène Simon in 1901. The tribe is a member of the subclade Simonida in the clade Astioida in the subfamily Salticinae. In 2016, Jerzy Prószyński added the genus to a group of genera named Belippines, named after the genus.

== Description ==
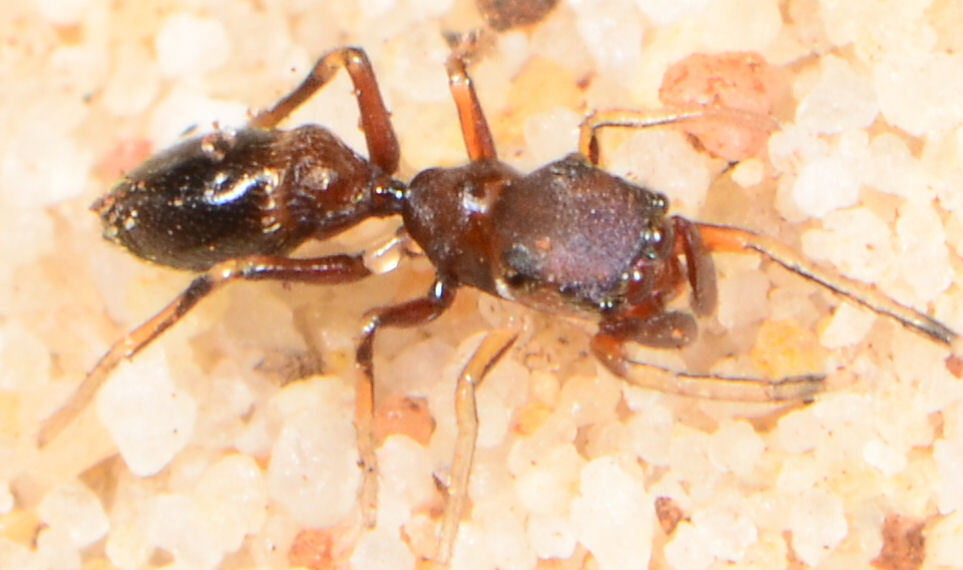
female B. meridionalis

Belippo are relatively small ant-like spiders. They often mimic ants of the genus Crematogaster. Their body is divided into two main parts: a forward section known as a cephalothorax and, behind that, another section called an abdomen. The male Belippo meridionalis has a cephalothorax that is typically 1.8 mm (0.07 in) long and 0.7 mm (0.03 in) wide. Its carapace, the hard upper part of the cephalothorax, is pitted and dark brown apart from the very front of its eye field, which is even darker. There is a shallow constriction at the back of the spider's eye field and colourless bristles around the front row of eyes. A scattering of white scales can be seen on the thorax. The underside of its cephalothorax, or sternum, is brown. The spider's face, or clypeus, is very low. Its mouthparts are brown and its large chelicerae are brownish-orange. It has a backward-pointing spur on the side its chelicerae. Inside, there are no teeth on the front and two teeth to the back. It is the lack of front teeth that distinguishes the species from the related Belippo cygniformis. Its chelicerae are also similar to the related Belippo pulchra, which also has no teeth at the front but has five to the back.

The male's abdomen is also 1.8 mm long and 09 mm (0.35 in) wide. It is oval, widest at the back, with a slight constriction about a third of the way back. The top is dark black with a strong glossy finish and covered with two shiny hard patches, or scuta. A scattering of long thin colourless hairs can be seen on the surface along with a pattern of patches formed of white scales behind the rearmost of the two scuta. The underside of its abdomen is brown and marked with two pale bands. It has short dark spinnerets to spin webs. Its legs are short, slender and yellow with a few dark areas, particularly on the front pair. There are twelve spines on the front legs, five on the second pair and none on any of the other legs.

The spider's copulatory organs help distinguish it from others in the genus. The male has brown pedipalps. Its papal tibia has a clump of long hairs and a two appendage or apophysis. One is short, narrow and topped with other consists of tooth-like projections. The other is sickle-shaped and hidden in a groove in the spider's cymbium. The cymbium is smooth and convex. Next to it, the palpal bulb consists of a round tegulum with a relatively long embolus. The embolus starts at the side circles round the tegulum twice and then projects out towards the front of the spider in the shade of the top of the cymbium.

The female spider is smaller than the male with a cephalothorax that is typically 1.5 mm (0.06 in) long and 0.6 mm (0.02 in) high and an abdomen that is typically 1.6 mm (0.06 in) long and 0.9 mm wide. It is generally similar to the male in shape, although it is lighter, particularly the bottom of its abdomen, which is whitish and has a pattern of two dark areas on its surface. Its chelicarae are shorter and have four teeth on the front and five on the back. There are dense hairs on the spider's tarsus and its pedipalps. Its epigyne, the external visible part of its copulatory organs, is delicate and lacks the pouches found on other species. It shows slight signs of sclerotization. Internally, it has very long membranous seminal ducts that loop many times. Their narrow parts also show evidence of sclerotization. They lead to spherical spermathecae, or receptacles.

== Distribution and habitat ==
Belippo spiders live in the Afrotropical realm. Belippo meridionalis is endemic to South Africa. It has been found in Gauteng, KwaZulu-Natal and Limpopo Provinces, living at altitudes of between 405 and 1,411 m (1,329 and 4,629 ft) above sea level. It is likely to be undersampled and to have a wider species distribution. The holotype was found in 2008 in the eMakhosini Ophathe Heritage Park. It was seen living in leaf litter amongst ants of the genus Crematogaster. The species has also been found in other nature reserves, including the Lhuvhondo, Ngome, Nylsvley and Roodeplaat Nature Reserves.
