= Pivaanspoort =

- Location within KwaZulu-Natal Location within South Africa
- Coordinates: 27.480°S 30.992°E
- Country: South Africa
- Province: KwaZulu-Natal
- District: Zululand
- Municipality: eDumbe

Area
  - Total: 6.96 km^{2} (2.69 sq mi)

Population (2011)
  - Total: 380
  - Density: 55/km^{2} (140/sq mi)

Racial makeup (2011)
  - Black African: 99.7%
  - White: 0.3%

First languages (2011)
  - Zulu: 96.3%
  - S. Ndebele: 1.6%
  - English: 1.3%
  - Other: 0.8%
- Time zone: UTC+2 (SAST)

Pivaanspoort is a town in eDumbe Local Municipality in the KwaZulu-Natal province of South Africa.
