= EMakhosini Ophathe Heritage Park =

Protected area in KwaZulu-Natal, South Africa

eMakhosini Ophathe Heritage Park
- IUCN category V (protected landscape/seascape)
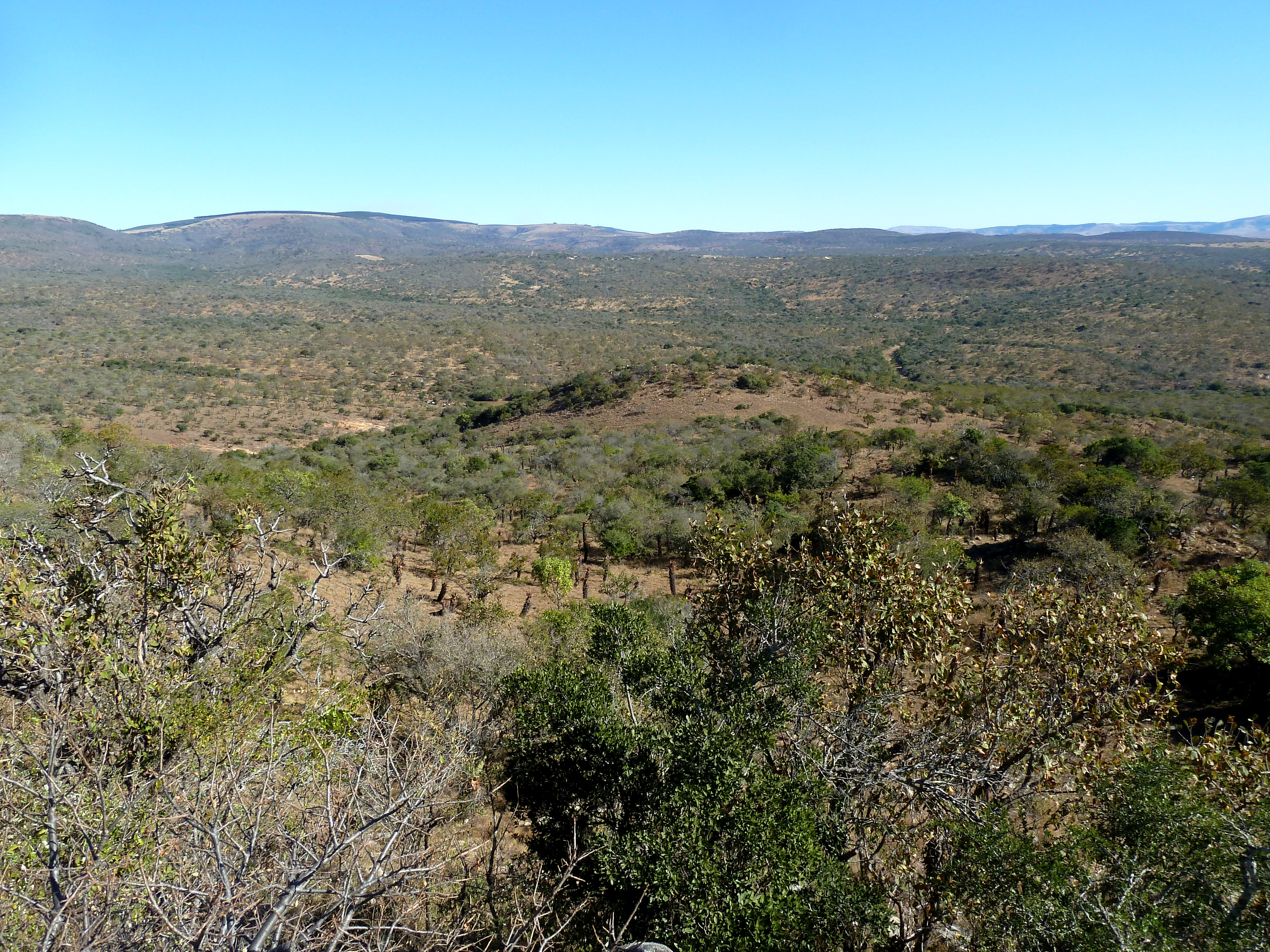
- Interactive map of eMakhosini Ophathe Heritage Park
- Location: Ulundi Local Municipality and Mthonjaneni Local Municipality, Zululand District Municipality
- Nearest city: Ulundi
- Coordinates: 28°31′S 31°40′E
- Area: 24,000 hectares (59,000 acres)
- Established: 2006
- Governing body: Ezemvelo KZN Wildlife (biodiversity); Amafa aKwaZulu-Natali (heritage)

The eMakhosini Ophathe Heritage Park is a protected area located approximately 10 kilometres south of Ulundi in the KwaZulu-Natal province of South Africa. The 24,000 hectares (59,000 acres) park lies on the banks of the White Mfolozi River and encompasses the eMakhosini Valley, known as the "Valley of the Kings" (eMakhosini meaning "place of the kings" in isiZulu), where seven early Zulu monarchs and a queen are buried.

The park was established in 2006 through the amalgamation of the 8,825 hectares (21,810 acres) Ophathe Game Reserve (proclaimed 1991) and approximately 13,000 hectares (32,000 acres) of land administered by Amafa aKwaZulu-Natali, the provincial heritage conservation agency. The vision for the heritage park is to recreate, as far as possible, the historical, cultural, and natural landscape of the eMakhosini Valley as it existed during the reign of King Shaka.

== Geography ==
The heritage park is situated within the Ulundi Local Municipality and Mthonjaneni Local Municipality of the Zululand District Municipality. The terrain is characterised by rugged topography, with elevations ranging from 270 metres above sea level in the eastern lowland sections adjacent to the White Mfolozi River to 987 metres in the south-western highlands of the Ophathe section.

The White Mfolozi River forms the principal hydrological feature, bordering the park to the north and east. Several smaller tributaries including the Ombesanoni River and Ophathe River pass through the reserve before entering the main river. The Ophathe Game Reserve forms part of the Northern Interior ecological corridor, connecting with the Ophathe–iMfolozi Link ecological corridor along the north-eastern boundary, providing potential connectivity with Hluhluwe–iMfolozi Park approximately 35 kilometres downstream.

== History ==
=== Zulu heritage ===
The eMakhosini Valley is considered the ancestral heartland and birthplace of the Zulu nation. King Shaka spent much of his youth in the valley, and King Dingane established his royal capital of Mgungundlovu here in 1829. The late King Goodwill Zwelithini kaBhekuzulu maintained a residence within the valley.

Seven Zulu kings and one queen are buried in the valley:

- King Zulu kaMalandela (founder of the Zulu clan)
- King Phunga kaNdaba
- King Mageba kaPhunga
- King Nkosinkulu kaMageba
- King Ndaba kaNkosinkulu
- King Jama kaNdaba
- King Senzangakhona kaJama (father of Shaka, Dingane, and Mpande)
- Queen Mthaniya (wife of King Jama and mother of Senzangakhona)

King Dinuzulu kaCetshwayo is also buried in the region.

=== Battle of Ophathe ===
On 27 December 1838, a significant engagement occurred in the Ophathe gorge between Zulu forces and the Voortrekker Wenkommando. Following the Battle of Blood River on 16 December 1838, the Voortrekkers pursued Zulu forces to recover captured livestock. At Mthonjaneni, a Zulu named Bongoza deceived the Voortrekkers into believing they could recover cattle in the Ophathe gorge. During their descent, the commando was lured into an ambush, resulting in a running battle between the two forces.

=== Battle of Gqokli Hill ===
The Battle of Gqokli Hill, fought within what is now the heritage park in 1818, was a decisive engagement between the forces of King Shaka and Inkosi Zwide of the Ndwandwe. Despite facing a numerically superior enemy, Shaka's innovative military tactics secured victory and established Zulu dominance in the region. Two other notable military leaders participated in this battle: Soshangane, who later founded the Gaza Empire in Mozambique, and Mzilikazi, who founded the Matabele Kingdom in present-day Zimbabwe.

=== Protected area establishment ===
The Ophathe Game Reserve was proclaimed in 1991 under the KwaZulu Nature Conservation Act of 1975. In 2006, the reserve was re-proclaimed to facilitate its incorporation into the larger eMakhosini Ophathe Heritage Park through amalgamation with land administered by Amafa aKwaZulu-Natali.

The World Wide Fund for Nature (WWF) has been instrumental in funding fencing of the area to facilitate wildlife reintroductions, with the long-term goal of removing internal fencing to provide black rhinoceros with access to over 20,000 hectares (49,000 acres) of their historical range.

== Flora ==
The park encompasses a diversity of vegetation types reflecting its altitudinal range and position in the transition zone between highland and lowland ecosystems. Vegetation communities include valley bushveld, mistbelt grassland, Ngongoni Veld, woodland, riparian forest, and freshwater wetlands.

The montane grassland in the higher-elevation south-western portions consists of open grassland with scattered woody plants including Coddia rudis, Ehretia rigida, Euclea species, Protea afra, and Vangueria infausta, largely restricted to areas around rocky outcrops.

The savanna woodlands at lower elevations are dominated by Vachellia gerrardi and Albizia species, with scattered Ziziphus mucronata (buffalo thorn), Sclerocarya birrea (marula), and Euclea species. Riparian vegetation along the rivers includes lush riverine forest providing habitat for forest-dependent bird species.

The park contains plant species of conservation concern, including Gnidia anthylloides and Buxus species listed as Endangered under the Threatened or Protected Species Regulations.

== Fauna ==
=== Mammals ===
The park supports populations of large mammals including black rhinoceros (Diceros bicornis), white rhinoceros (Ceratotherium simum), African buffalo (Syncerus caffer), giraffe (Giraffa camelopardalis), blue wildebeest (Connochaetes taurinus), Burchell's zebra (Equus quagga burchellii), greater kudu (Tragelaphus strepsiceros), bushbuck (Tragelaphus scriptus), nyala (Tragelaphus angasii), impala (Aepyceros melampus), waterbuck (Kobus ellipsiprymnus), and common warthog (Phacochoerus africanus).

Predators include leopard (Panthera pardus) and spotted hyena (Crocuta crocuta).

The park is of particular importance for black rhinoceros conservation as it falls within the species' historical range, which was largely lost to human encroachment during the 20th century. The reintroduction of black rhinos into the fenced heritage park has restored habitat connectivity for this critically endangered species.

=== Avifauna ===
The diverse habitats support a rich bird community. Notable species include martial eagle (Polemaetus bellicosus), listed under the Threatened or Protected Species Regulations, orange-breasted bushshrike (Chlorophoneus sulfureopectus), grey-headed bushshrike (Malaconotus blanchoti), white-throated robin-chat (Cossypha humeralis), black-crowned tchagra (Tchagra senegalus), brown-crowned tchagra (Tchagra australis), black-backed puffback (Dryoscopus cubla), crested francolin (Ortygornis sephaena), emerald-spotted wood dove (Turtur chalcospilos), white-crested helmetshrike (Prionops plumatus), scaly-throated honeyguide (Indicator variegatus), crowned hornbill (Lophoceros alboterminatus), Kurrichane thrush (Turdus libonyana), groundscraper thrush (Turdus litsitsirupa), and yellow-breasted apalis (Apalis flavida).

White-backed vulture (Gyps africanus) nesting colonies have been recorded along the Ophathe River.

=== Invertebrates ===
A comprehensive survey of non-acarine arachnids was conducted as part of the South African National Survey of Arachnida (SANSA) in 2007 and 2008. The study recorded 282 species in six arachnid orders from four representative habitats within the Ophathe Game Reserve section. Spiders (Araneae) were the most species-rich order, represented by 268 species in 47 families. This diversity is comparable to that found in other savanna reserves in South Africa and demonstrates the conservation value of the park for invertebrate biodiversity.

The SANSA survey employed seven sampling methods: pitfall traps, beating, sweep-netting, litter sifting, hand collecting, night collecting, and Winkler traps. Sample completeness analysis indicated that a large proportion of the species pool had been sampled, validating the rapid sampling protocol for biodiversity assessment in savanna ecosystems.

== Heritage sites ==
=== Spirit of eMakhosini Monument ===
The Spirit of eMakhosini monument was inaugurated in 2003 by King Goodwill Zwelithini as a memorial to his ancestors. The monument comprises a massive bronze imbiza (traditional Zulu beer pot) surrounded by 18 bronze reliefs depicting scenes of traditional Zulu life. Seven large horns symbolise the seven Zulu kings buried in the valley. The beer pot, found in every traditional household, symbolises both the valley's heritage and a spirit of togetherness. The monument sits on a beaded plinth on a hill overlooking the valley.

=== Mgungundlovu ===
Mgungundlovu was the royal capital of King Dingane from 1829 to 1838. The site is located south-west of Ulundi on the R34 road. It was here that Voortrekker leader Piet Retief and his party were executed on the orders of King Dingane in February 1838. Dingane torched and abandoned the capital following military defeats later that year.

=== Other sites ===
Additional heritage sites within the park include the Gqokli Hill Battlefield viewsite, the Ophathe Battlefield viewsite, and kwaMatiwane, where Piet Retief and his men were buried. An orientation centre with audio-visual displays interprets the history of the region and the Zulu nation.

Archaeological investigations have revealed Stone Age tools and evidence of historical interactions between indigenous communities and early European settlers.

== Tourism ==
The park offers tourism facilities including picnic sites, walking trails, game drives, and access to heritage sites. Approximately 28 kilometres of roads traverse the Ophathe section, with several watering points and a covered bird hide for wildlife observation. A 4×4 route traverses the mountainous terrain in the south-western sector.

Visitor facilities are limited compared to larger KwaZulu-Natal reserves. The use of local guides is recommended to enhance interpretation of the cultural and historical sites.

The park is accessible via the R34 road linking Vryheid and Melmoth, with the Mtonjaneni turnoff providing access to the heritage sites.

== Management and conservation ==
Management of the biodiversity within the park is undertaken by Ezemvelo KZN Wildlife in accordance with the National Environmental Management: Protected Areas Act (No. 57 of 2003). The heritage sites are administered by Amafa aKwaZulu-Natali under a memorandum of understanding between the two organisations.

Conservation challenges include poaching pressure (particularly targeting rhinoceros), illegal hunting with dogs, theft of boundary fencing, and encroachment by livestock from neighbouring communal lands. Some activities near the royal burial sites have been identified as requiring better management to maintain the dignity of the heritage area.

=== World Heritage nomination ===
The eMakhosini burial site is being considered for World Heritage Site status. Professor Sihawu Ngubane of the University of KwaZulu-Natal has noted that World Heritage designation would enhance interest in Zulu culture and traditions, preserve the site's cultural and historical significance, and promote engagement with knowledgeable members of the local community. The nomination follows the successful inscription of the uKhahlamba Drakensberg Park, iSimangaliso Wetland Park, and Sibhudu Cave as South African World Heritage Sites.

== See also ==
- Hluhluwe–iMfolozi Park
- Nkandla Forest
- Ulundi
- Zulu Kingdom
- Battle of Blood River
- Battle of Ulundi
- Mgungundlovu
