= UPhongolo Local Municipality =

uPhongolo
- Local municipality
- Seal

- Location of UPhongolo Local Municipality within KwaZulu-Natal
- Coordinates: 27°23′S 31°37′E
- Country: South Africa
- Province: KwaZulu-Natal
- District: Zululand
- Seat: Pongola
- Wards: 15

Government
  - Type: Municipal council
  - Mayor: Mr. S Mhlongo (2020)

Area
  - Total: 3,239 km^{2} (1,251 sq mi)

Population (2011)
  - Total: 127,238
  - Density: 39.28/km^{2} (101.7/sq mi)

Racial makeup (2011)
  - Black African: 98.1%
  - Coloured: 0.1%
  - Indian/Asian: 0.1%
  - White: 1.5%

First languages (2011)
  - Zulu: 94.0%
  - Afrikaans: 1.5%
  - Southern Ndebele: 1.2%
  - English: 1.1%
  - Other: 2.2%
- Time zone: UTC+2 (SAST)
- Municipal code: KZN262

uPhongolo Municipality (Zulu: UMasipala wasoPhongolo) is a local municipality within the northern area of the Zululand District Municipality, in the KwaZulu-Natal province of South Africa.

In 2007, the municipality contained 154 rural shops, 124 schools, 27 hotels, resorts or conference facilities, 15 clinics, 12 recreational facilities, 6 community halls, 4 post offices, 2 police stations, and 2 law courts. The municipality is largely composed of traditional areas, with tribal land patterns and high density rural settlements. 82% of the population lives in rural areas.

== Geography ==
The N2 national road corridor passes through the uPhongolo area as a national link between Gauteng and the Richards Bay complex, and on to Durban in the south. It also connects with Eswatini just to the north of the uPhongolo Municipal area. This is the primary development corridor in uPhongolo.

The two main rivers in the municipality are the Mkuze River in the south and the uPhongolo River in the north, the latter feeding the Pongolapoort Dam, located on the eastern boundary of the municipality.

The uPhongolo River rises just east of Wakkerstroom and drains an area of nearly 8,000 km^{2} where the rainfall often exceeds 1,000 mm a year. Because the irrigation weir at Pongola could not fully regulate the river's erratic water flow, the 89-meter-high Pongolapoort Dam wall was built in 1972 in a narrow gorge in the Lebombo Mountains. Phongolo is the Zulu word for "trough," referring to the many deep pools with steep sides along the river's course. Also located near Eswatini.

== Economy ==
Agriculture and tourism form the basis for the municipality’s economy. Major development components consist of game and nature reserves, agricultural activities, traditional settlement areas and some urban nodes.

The public sector is the dominant provider of employment opportunities. However, the informal sector is expanding, primarily based on the taxi industry, informal financial services and taverns.

Large areas of sugarcane and citrus are cultivated in the region.

The uPhongolo Municipality provides regional access to a wide range of tourist activities outside its own boundaries. It has within its area of jurisdiction two key tourist attractions: the Ithala Game Reserve and the Pongolapoort Dam. These attractions are complemented by a large number of private game farms and game reserves, on which a number of lodges and other tourist facilities are located.

Average income levels are low, with 66% of households receiving no income or less than R2400 per month. The traditional and rural areas are the most poverty stricken. Unemployment levels are relatively high; only 13.43% of the population are formally employed. Close to half of the population are children, placing pressure on the need for educational and social facilities. Many of these children are orphaned as a result of HIV/AIDS.

== Politics ==
The municipal council consists of twenty-nine members elected by mixed-member proportional representation. Fifteen councillors are elected by first-past-the-post voting in fifteen wards, while the remaining fourteen are chosen from party lists so that the total number of party representatives is proportional to the number of votes received.

In the election of 4 November 2026 the Inkatha Freedom Party (IFP) lost its majority, but remains the largest party.

The following table shows the results of the election.

Party	Ward			List			Total seats
Party	Votes	%	Seats	Votes	%	Seats	Total seats
Inkatha Freedom Party	13,983	34.98	9	13,942	34.90	1	10
uMkhonto weSizwe Party	10,198	25.51	2	10,797	27.03	6	8
African National Congress	10,494	26.25	4	10,382	25.99	4	8
National Freedom Party	1,180	2.95	0	1,155	2.89	1	1
Democratic Alliance	912	2.28	0	1,056	2.64	1	1
Freedom Front Plus	901	2.25	0	919	2.30	1	1
Independent candidates	754	1.89	0				0
13 other parties	1,557	3.89	0	1,692	4.24	0	0
Total	39,979	100.00	15	39,943	100.00	14	29
Valid votes	39,979	99.08		39,943	99.13		
Invalid/blank votes	371	0.92		352	0.87		
Total votes	40,350	100.00		40,295	100.00		
Registered voters/turnout	73,357	55.00		73,357	54.93		

== Main places ==
The 2001 census divided the municipality into the following main places:

Place	Code	Area (km^{2})	Population
Dlamini	52801	59.89	2,073
Itala Nature Reserve	52802	251.71	149
Msibi	52803	140.19	6,728
Ntshangase	52804	258.14	49,672
Pongola	52805	4.66	2,562
Sibiya/Masidla	52806	258.68	24,908
Simelane	52807	67.64	10,813
Remainder of the municipality	52808	2,190.35	22,865
