= Bivane River =

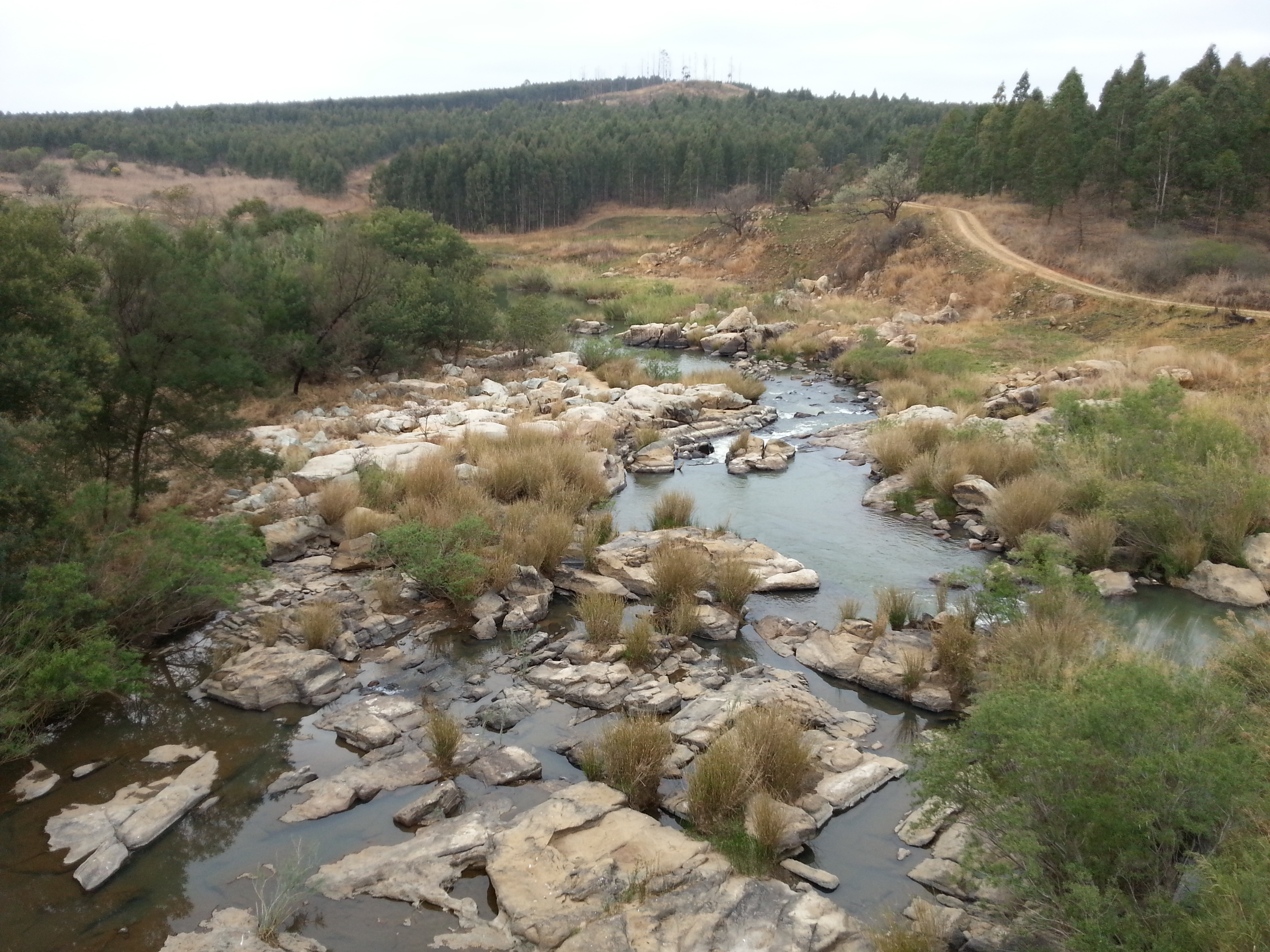

- Location of the Bivane River mouth
- Etymology: Origin of name uncertain, perhaps from the Zulu imbavana or impivane, meaning 'waterbuck'.

Location
- Country: South Africa

Physical characteristics
- Source: Balelasberg
  - location: North of Utrecht
  - elevation: 2,100 m (6,900 ft)
- Mouth: Phongolo River
  - location: Kwazulu-Natal, South Africa
  - coordinates: 27°26′33″S 31°12′30″E
  - elevation: 480 m (1,570 ft)

The Bivane River (also Pivaan River), a right bank tributary of the Pongola River, is situated in northern KwaZulu-Natal, South Africa.

== Course ==
The ultimate source of the river is at over 2,000 m a.s.l. in the uplands north of Utrecht. It flows between rolling uplands dotted with commercial plantations, passing under the Kruger Bridge of 1898, before reaching Pivaansbad south of Paulpietersburg, where hot springs and the Natal Spa resort are located. Downstream it enters open but hilly terrain until it enters the Bivane Dam, where the Bivane Dam resort and a nature reserve of 2,000 ha are located. Downstream of the dam the river enters more rugged terrain, and the turbulent waters are popular with canoeists, and besides for river rafting. This area is also the starting point for the annual Ithala Challenge Canoe Marathon. The river has a confluence with the Pongola on the western boundary of the Ithala Game Reserve, not far from the border with Eswatini.

== Dams ==
The Bivane Dam was completed in 2000 at its confluence with the Manzana River, to provide for a local irrigation scheme.

== Gallery ==
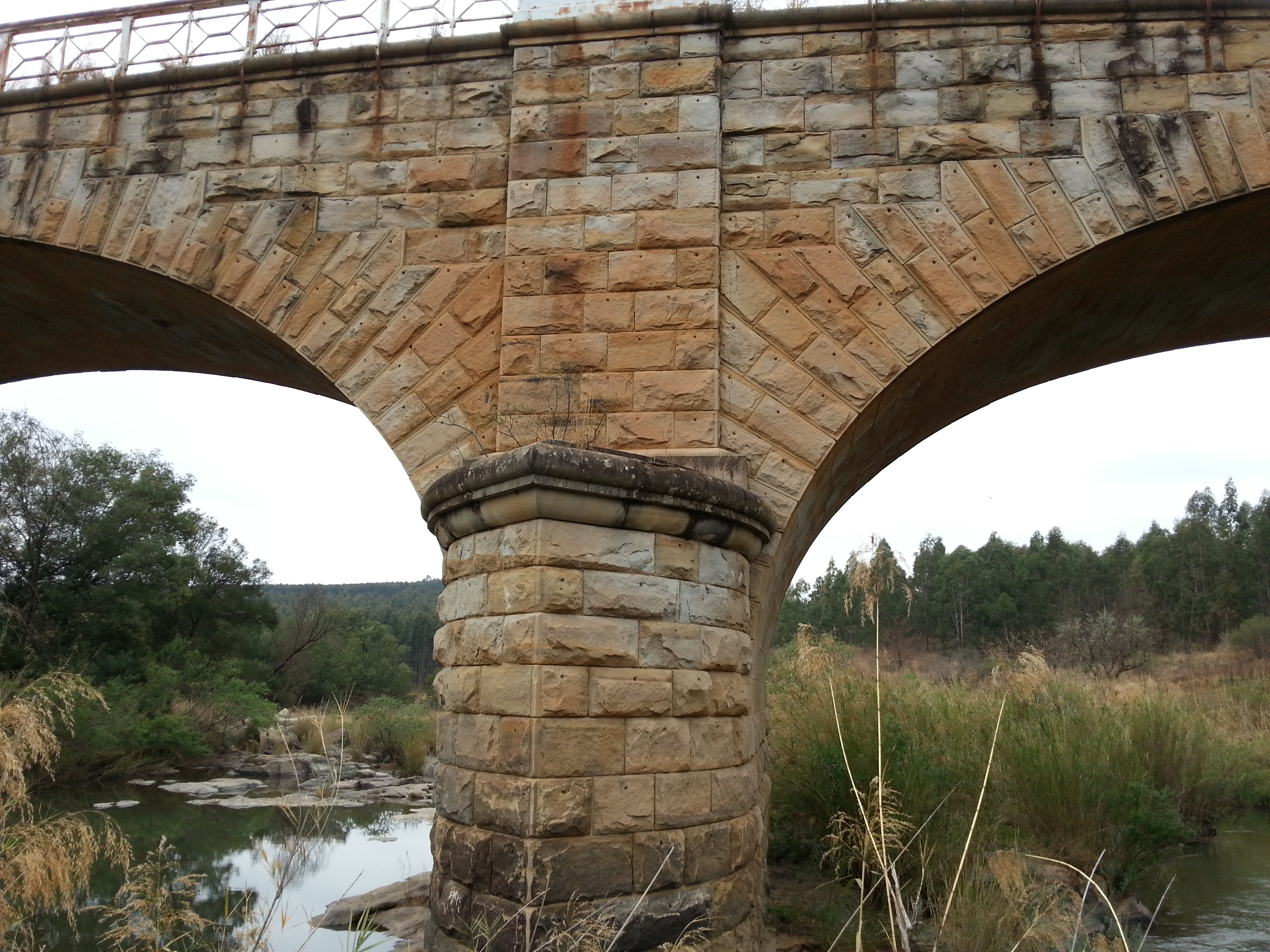
Kruger Bridge of 1898

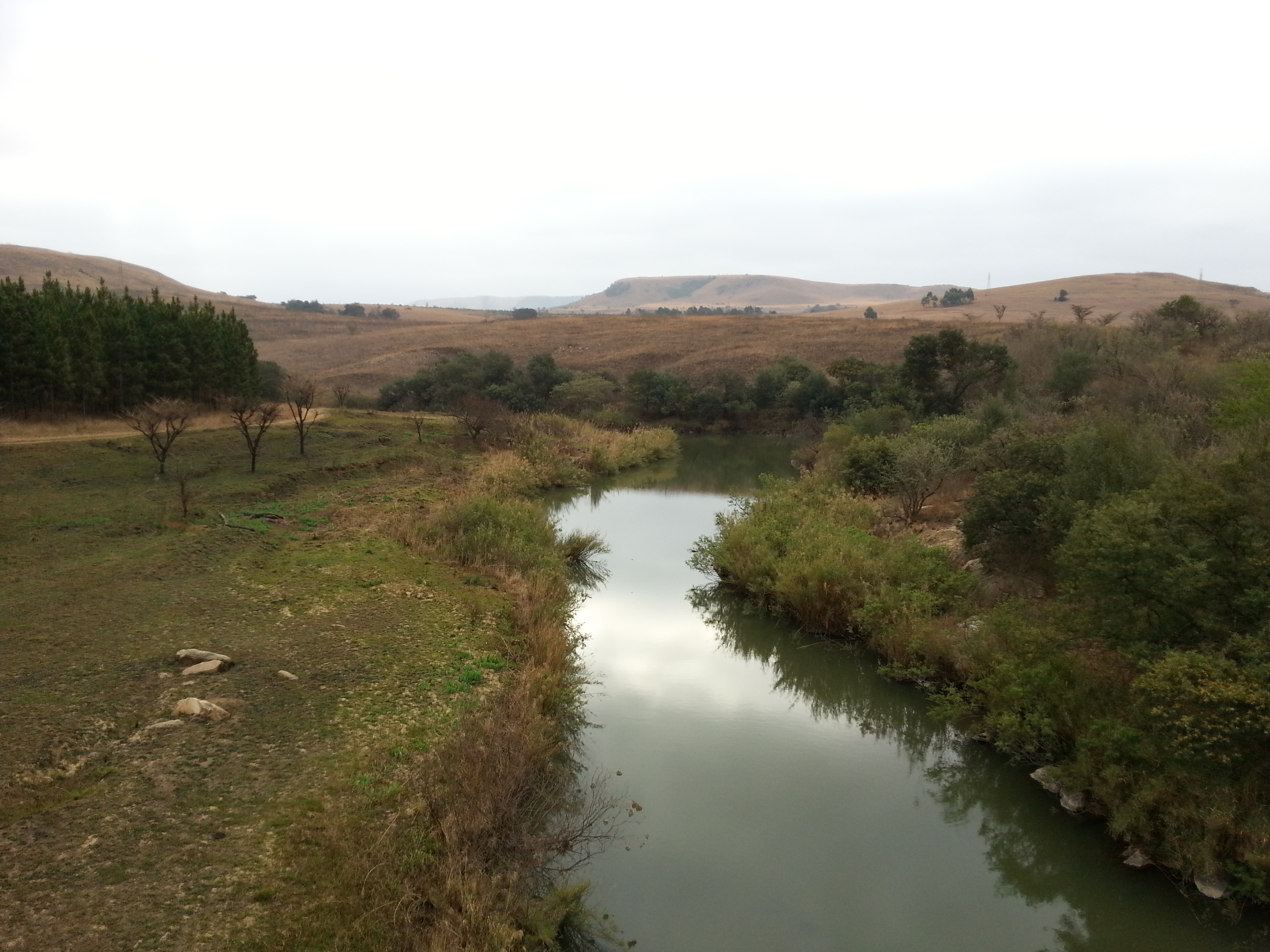
Upstream of Kruger Bridge

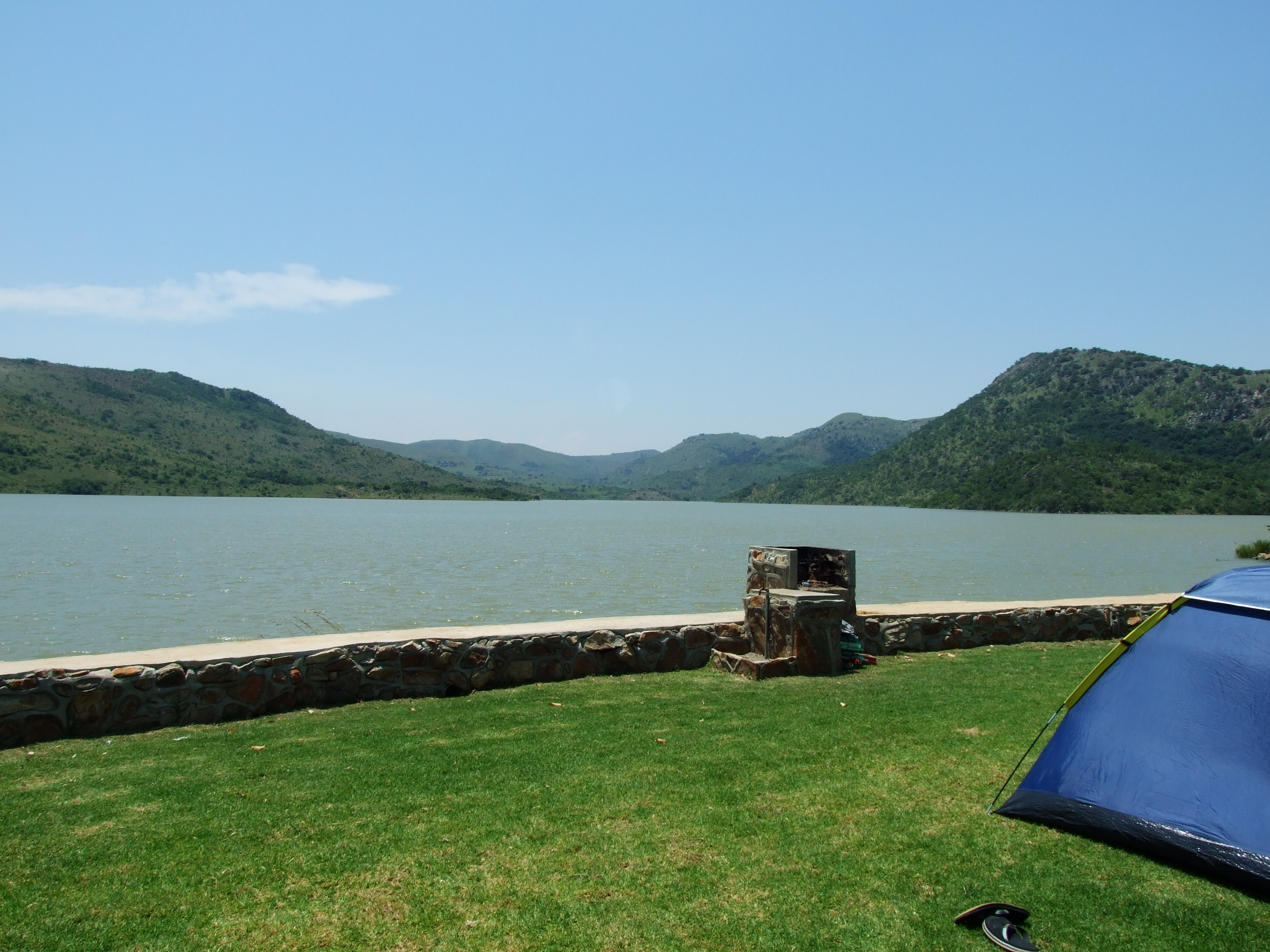
Bivane Dam
