= Eucithara abakcheutos =

Scientific classification
- Kingdom: Animalia
- Phylum: Mollusca
- Class: Gastropoda
- Subclass: Caenogastropoda
- Order: Neogastropoda
- Superfamily: Conoidea
- Family: Mangeliidae
- Genus: Eucithara
- Species: E. abakcheutos

Binomial name
- Eucithara abakcheutos Kilburn, 1992

Species of gastropod

Eucithara abakcheutos is a small sea snail, a marine gastropod mollusk in the family Mangeliidae.

== Description ==
The shell size attains 8 mm, its diameter 3.6 mm.

The small shell has a biconic-fusiform shape with a small, but sharp protoconch. The five teleoconch whorls are convex. The whorls are slightly concave at the shoulder. The aperture is long and narrow. The outer lip shows a thick varix. The inner lip is smooth or with small denticles. The ten opisthocline axial ribs are more or les prominent but do not project above the suture. The axial ribs are markedly narrower than the interstices, becoming weak below the shallow suture. The main interstices show a row of microscopic granules. The spiral sculpture is coarser (about 20-27 lirae on penultimate whorl). The siphonal canal is short. The color of the shell is white, the body whorl is suffused with brownish.

== Distribution ==
This marine species has been found on the inner continental shelf of northern Zululand, South Africa.
