= EDumbe Local Municipality elections =

Local elections in KwaZulu-Natal, South Africa

The eDumbe Local Municipality council consists of nineteen members elected by mixed-member proportional representation. Ten councillors are elected by first-past-the-post voting in ten wards, while the remaining nine are chosen from party lists so that the total number of party representatives is proportional to the number of votes received.

In the election of 4 November 2026, the Inkatha Freedom Party won a plurality of 6 seats.

== Results ==
The following table shows the composition of the council after past elections.

Event	ANC	DA	EFF	IFP	NFP	MKP	Other	Total
2000 election	4	1	—	9	—	—	—	14
2006 election	4	1	—	9	—	—	0	14
2011 election	4	1	—	2	8	—	0	15
2016 election	8	5	0	3	—	—	0	16
2021 election	5	1	1	5	6	—	1	19
2026 election	3	1	1	6	2	5	1	19

== December 2000 election ==
The following table shows the results of the 2000 election.

Party	Ward			List			Total seats
Party	Votes	%	Seats	Votes	%	Seats	Total seats
Inkatha Freedom Party	6,768	66.49	7	7,118	67.70	2	9
African National Congress	2,646	25.99	0	2,593	24.66	4	4
Democratic Alliance	765	7.52	0	803	7.64	1	1
Total	10,179	100.00	7	10,514	100.00	7	14
Valid votes	10,179	95.32		10,514	97.12		
Invalid/blank votes	500	4.68		312	2.88		
Total votes	10,679	100.00		10,826	100.00		
Registered voters/turnout	22,754	46.93		22,754	47.58		

== March 2006 election ==
The following table shows the results of the 2006 election.

Party	Ward			List			Total seats
Party	Votes	%	Seats	Votes	%	Seats	Total seats
Inkatha Freedom Party	8,726	64.54	5	8,659	64.13	4	9
African National Congress	3,519	26.03	2	3,783	28.02	2	4
Democratic Alliance	969	7.17	0	1,060	7.85	1	1
Independent candidates	307	2.27	0				0
Total	13,521	100.00	7	13,502	100.00	7	14
Valid votes	13,521	97.59		13,502	97.52		
Invalid/blank votes	334	2.41		344	2.48		
Total votes	13,855	100.00		13,846	100.00		
Registered voters/turnout	26,879	51.55		26,879	51.51		

== May 2011 election ==
The following table shows the results of the 2011 election.

Party	Ward			List			Total seats
Party	Votes	%	Seats	Votes	%	Seats	Total seats
National Freedom Party	10,315	52.11	6	10,237	51.70	2	8
African National Congress	5,418	27.37	2	5,514	27.85	2	4
Inkatha Freedom Party	3,157	15.95	0	3,188	16.10	2	2
Democratic Alliance	895	4.52	0	861	4.35	1	1
Independent candidates	8	0.04	0				0
Total	19,793	100.00	8	19,800	100.00	7	15
Valid votes	19,793	98.58		19,800	98.64		
Invalid/blank votes	286	1.42		273	1.36		
Total votes	20,079	100.00		20,073	100.00		
Registered voters/turnout	32,274	62.21		32,274	62.20		

== August 2016 election ==
The following table shows the results of the 2016 election.

Party	Ward			List			Total seats
Party	Votes	%	Seats	Votes	%	Seats	Total seats
African National Congress	11,308	50.15	7	11,512	51.16	1	8
Democratic Alliance	6,542	29.01	1	6,640	29.51	4	5
Inkatha Freedom Party	3,422	15.18	0	3,593	15.97	3	3
Economic Freedom Fighters	466	2.07	0	413	1.84	0	0
Independent candidates	524	2.32	0				0
African People's Convention	183	0.81	0	186	0.83	0	0
Freedom Front Plus	104	0.46	0	160	0.71	0	0
Total	22,549	100.00	8	22,504	100.00	8	16
Valid votes	22,549	98.57		22,504	98.37		
Invalid/blank votes	328	1.43		373	1.63		
Total votes	22,877	100.00		22,877	100.00		
Registered voters/turnout	37,780	60.55		37,780	60.55		

No party obtained a council majority. Siyabonga Kunene of the African National Congress (ANC) was subsequently elected mayor and Nyanga Ndlangamandla of the Inkatha Freedom Party (IFP) was elected deputy mayor.

== November 2021 election ==
The following table shows the results of the 2021 election.

Party	Ward			List			Total seats
Party	Votes	%	Seats	Votes	%	Seats	Total seats
National Freedom Party	7,712	33.61	6	7,693	33.47	0	6
African National Congress	5,361	23.37	2	5,445	23.69	3	5
Inkatha Freedom Party	5,233	22.81	2	5,448	23.71	3	5
Economic Freedom Fighters	1,745	7.61	0	1,671	7.27	1	1
Abantu Batho Congress	1,413	6.16	0	1,409	6.13	1	1
Democratic Alliance	794	3.46	0	776	3.38	1	1
Activists Movement of South Africa	108	0.47	0	108	0.47	0	0
African People's Convention	112	0.49	0	54	0.23	0	0
African People's Movement	93	0.41	0	73	0.32	0	0
African Transformation Movement	81	0.35	0	83	0.36	0	0
National People's Front	64	0.28	0	78	0.34	0	0
Academic Congress Union	47	0.20	0	39	0.17	0	0
Independent candidates	79	0.34	0				0
African Freedom Revolution	36	0.16	0	42	0.18	0	0
African Christian Democratic Party	36	0.16	0	31	0.13	0	0
Black First Land First	29	0.13	0	32	0.14	0	0
Total	22,943	100.00	10	22,982	100.00	9	19
Valid votes	22,943	98.64		22,982	98.51		
Invalid/blank votes	317	1.36		348	1.49		
Total votes	23,260	100.00		23,330	100.00		
Registered voters/turnout	40,418	57.55		40,418	57.72		

After the election, the National Freedom Party (NFP) and the ANC formed an arrangement, with the NFP taking the mayor and speaker positions, and the ANC taking the deputy mayor and chief whip position.

== November 2026 election ==
The following table shows the results of the 2026 election.

Party	Ward			List			Total seats
Party	Votes	%	Seats	Votes	%	Seats	Total seats
Inkatha Freedom Party	8,188	32.25	6	8,193	32.24	0	6
uMkhonto weSizwe Party	6,663	26.24	3	6,780	26.68	2	5
African National Congress	4,530	17.84	1	4,429	17.43	2	3
National Freedom Party	1,880	7.40	0	1,793	7.06	2	2
National Peoples Ambassadors	993	3.91	0	1,020	4.01	1	1
Democratic Alliance	859	3.38	0	990	3.90	1	1
Economic Freedom Fighters	925	3.64	0	904	3.56	1	1
Nyoni Progress Party	526	2.07	0	465	1.83	0	0
South African Communist Party	376	1.48	0	349	1.37	0	0
Afrika Mayibuye Movement	152	0.60	0	134	0.53	0	0
African Transformation Movement	111	0.44	0	97	0.38	0	0
African Renaissance Unity	18	0.07	0	96	0.38	0	0
Labour Party	48	0.19	0	50	0.20	0	0
African Economic Freedom	45	0.18	0	43	0.17	0	0
Pan Africanist Congress of Azania	44	0.17	0	33	0.13	0	0
Abantu Bezwelethu Congress Democracy	33	0.13	0	34	0.13	0	0
Total	25,391	100.00	10	25,410	100.00	9	19
Valid votes	25,391	98.86		25,410	98.92		
Invalid/blank votes	294	1.14		278	1.08		
Total votes	25,685	100.00		25,688	100.00		
Registered voters/turnout	44,608	57.58		44,608	57.59		
