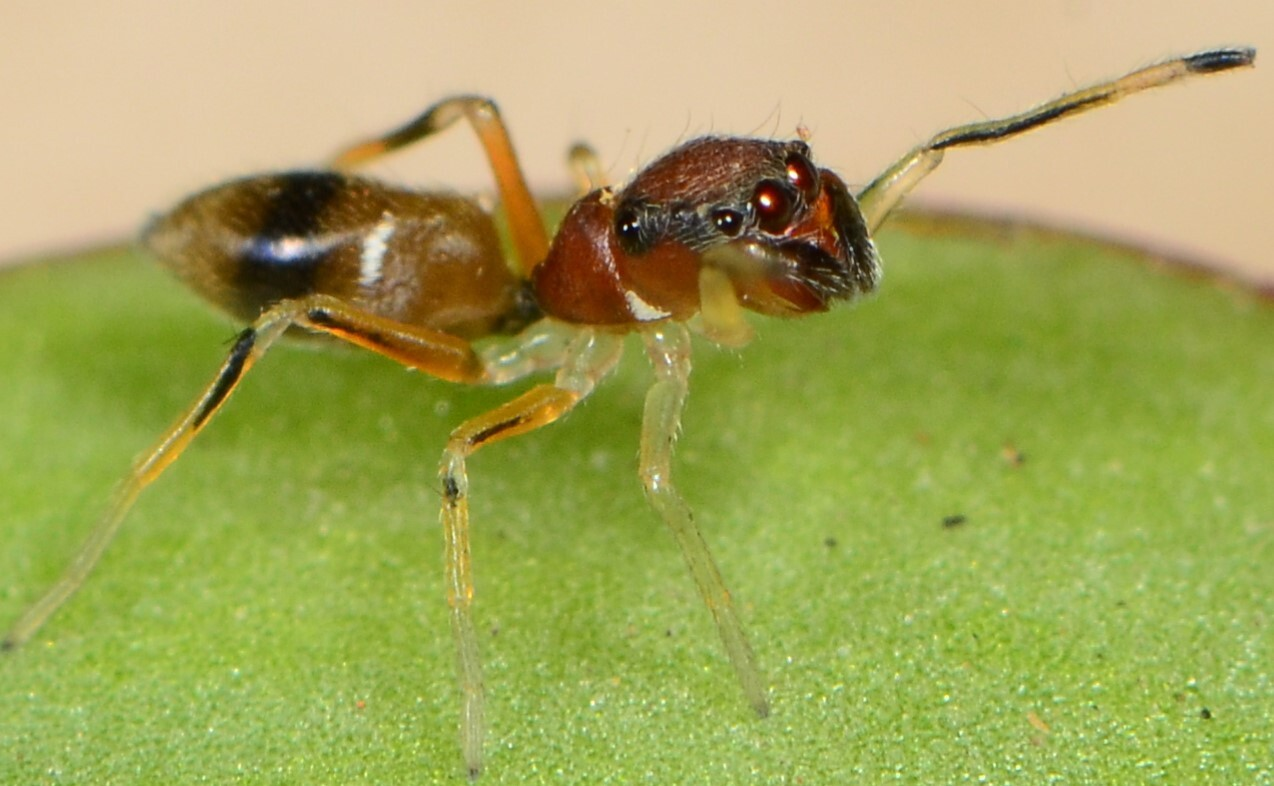
- juvenile female
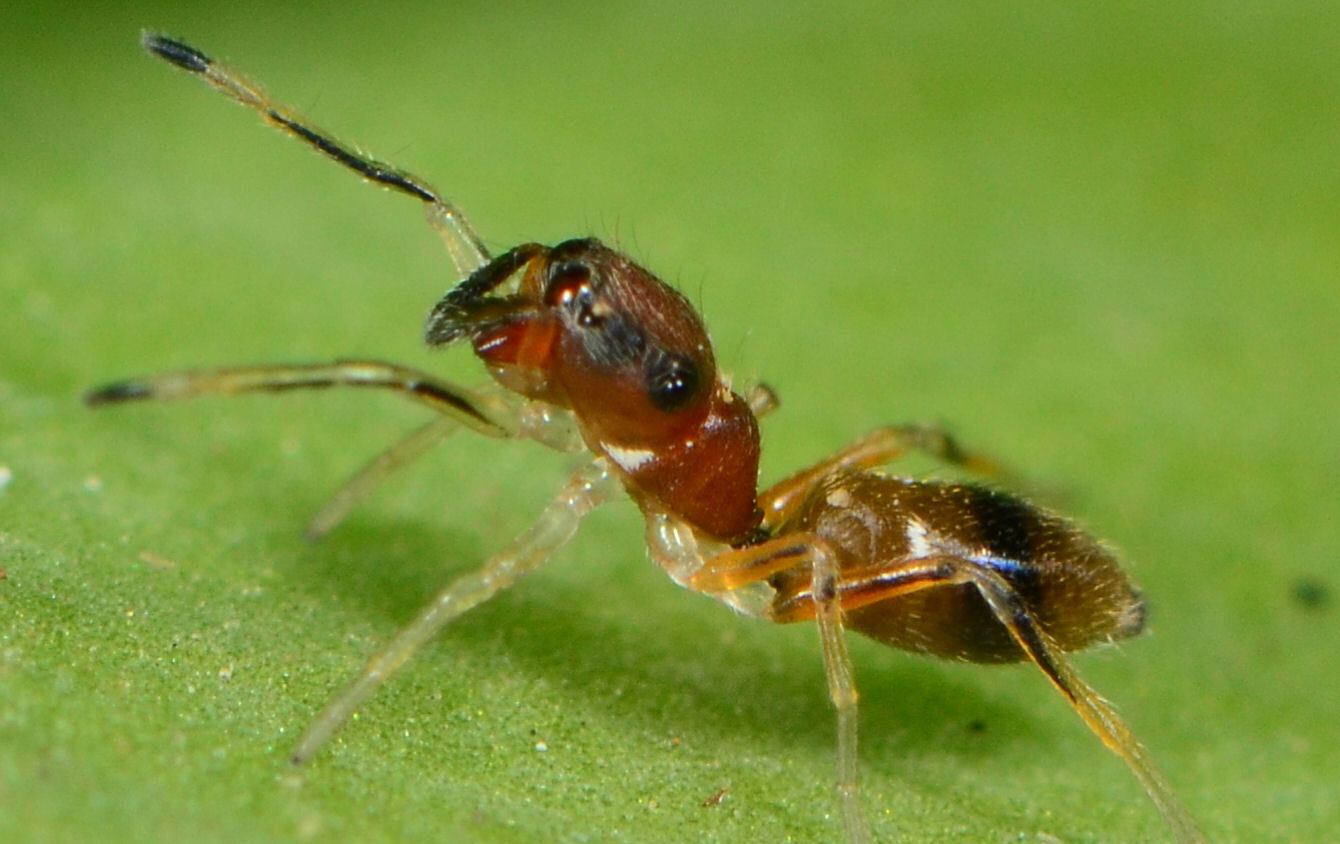
- juvenile female

Conservation status
- Least Concern (IUCN 3.1)

Scientific classification
- Kingdom: Animalia
- Phylum: Arthropoda
- Subphylum: Chelicerata
- Class: Arachnida
- Order: Araneae
- Infraorder: Araneomorphae
- Family: Salticidae
- Genus: Belippo
- Species: B. pulchra

Binomial name
- Belippo pulchra Haddad & Wesołowska, 2013

= Belippo pulchra =

Magoebaskloof Belippo Jumping Spider

Species of spider

Belippo pulchra, the Magoebaskloof Belippo Jumping Spider, is a jumping spider species that lives in South Africa. A member of the genus Belippo, the spider is small, with a cephalothorax that is between 1.7 and 1.8 mm (0.07 and 0.07 in) long and an abdomen between 1.8 and 2.4 mm (0.09 in) long. The female is generally lighter than the male, both resembling ants of the genus Crematogaster. The spider's cephalothorax is dark brown on top and light brown underneath, and its abdomen is black on top and brown underneath. The abdomen has a pattern that differs between the sexes, with the female having white triangular patch that the male lacks. The male has distinctive chelicerae that lack any teeth on the front margin. This helps distinguish it from other members of the genus. The female is harder to distinguish, particularly in comparison to the related Belippo anguina and Belippo nexilis, which have similar copulatory organs.

== Taxonomy and etymology ==
Belippo pulchra is a species of jumping spider, a member of the family Salticidae, that was first described by the arachnologists Charles Haddad and Wanda Wesołowskain 2013. They assigned the species to the genus Belippo, first circumscribed by Eugène Simon in 1910. The specific name is a Latin word that can be translated 'pretty'. It is known as the Magoebaskloof Belippo Jumping Spider.

In Wayne Maddison's 2015 study of spider phylogenetic classification, the genus Belippo was allocated to the tribe Myrmarachnini, named by Eugène Simon in 1901. The tribe is a member of the subclade Simonida in the clade Astioida in the subfamily Salticinae. In 2016, Jerzy Prószyński added the genus to a group of genera named Belippines, named after the genus.

== Description ==
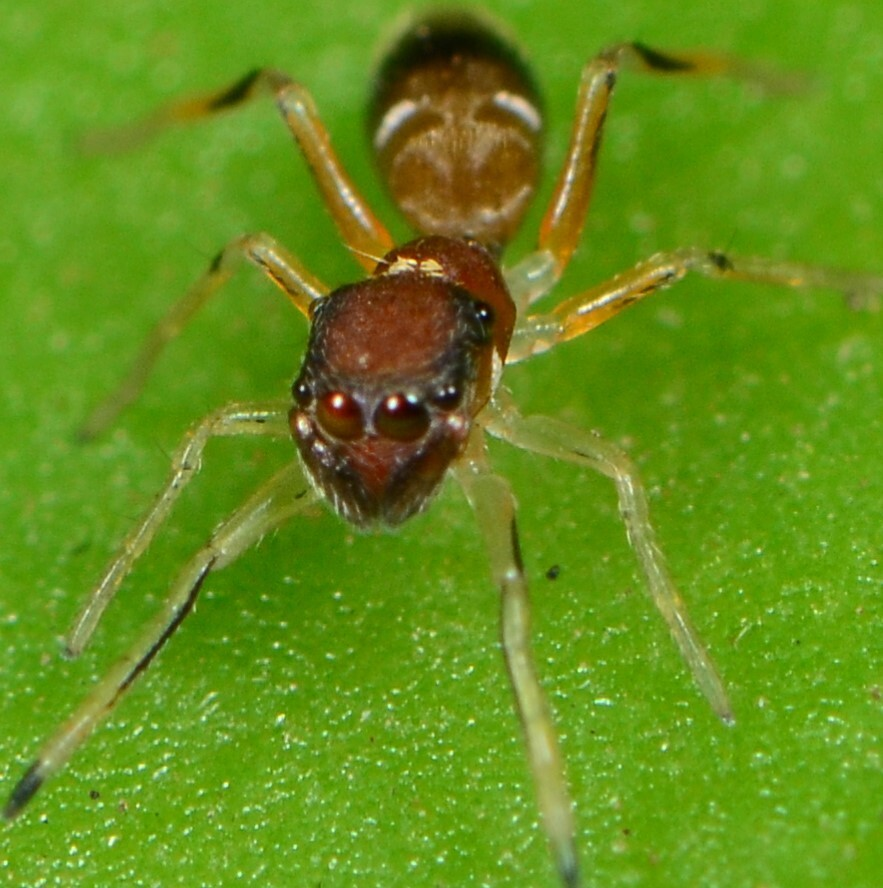
juvenile female

Belippo are relatively small ant-like spiders. They often mimic ants of the genus Crematogaster. Their body is divided into two main parts: a forward section known as a cephalothorax and, behind that, another section called an abdomen. The male Belippo pulchra has a cephalothorax that is typically 1.7 mm (0.07 in) long and 0.6 mm (0.02 in) high. Its carapace, the hard upper part of the cephalothorax, is dark brown apart from the very front of its eye field, which is black. There is a shallow constriction at the back of the spider's pitted eye field and black rings around the front row of eyes. A scattering of white hairs can be seen on the thorax. The underside of its cephalothorax, or sternum, is light brown.

The male's abdomen is typically 1.8 mm (0.07 in) long and 1 mm (0.04 in) wide. The top is black and covered with a shiny hard patch, or scuta, that has a covering of thin colourless hairs. There are small patches formed of white scales approximately one-third down the surface. The underside of its abdomen is brown with two light streaks that narrow towards the back of the spider. It has short yellowish-grey spinnerets to spin webs. Its legs are short, slender and yellow with a few dark patches, particularly on the front pair. There are also spines on the front legs. The spider has large, elongated and reddish-brown chelicerae that have no teeth on their front front margin and six teeth to the rear. The remaining mouthparts are light brown. It is the shape of the chelicerae and the lack of teeth on its front row that most easily distinguishes the spider from others in the genus.

The spider's copulatory organs help distinguish it from others in the genus. The male has brown pedipalps. The spider's palpal bulb consists of a round tegulum with a relatively long embolus that starts at the side circles round the tegulum twice and then projects out towards the front of the spider set within a groove in the cymbium. Its palpal tibia is small and has a short appendages or apophyses, that is topped with other consists of tooth-like projections.

The female spider is similar in size to the male with a cephalothorax that is between 1.7 and 1.8 mm (0.07 in) long and similarly 0.6 high, and an abdomen that is between 1.8 and 2.4 mm (0.09 in) long and between 1 and 1.5 mm (0.06 in) wide. It is generally similar to the male in shape, although it is lighter and has a pattern on its abdomen that consists of a light band that crosses from side to side, two pale round patches in the middle and a triangle-shaped patch at the rear. Its legs are also different, being whitish-yellow with a black line marking their sides.

The female's copulatory organs are very similar to Belippo anguina and Belippo nexilis. Its epigyne, the external visible part of its copulatory organs, shows evidence of sclerotization and has two central depressions flanking a broad ridge. Internally, it has long seminal ducts that lead to spermathecae, or receptacles, that consist of two spherical chambers connected by a long narrow duct.

== Distribution and habitat ==
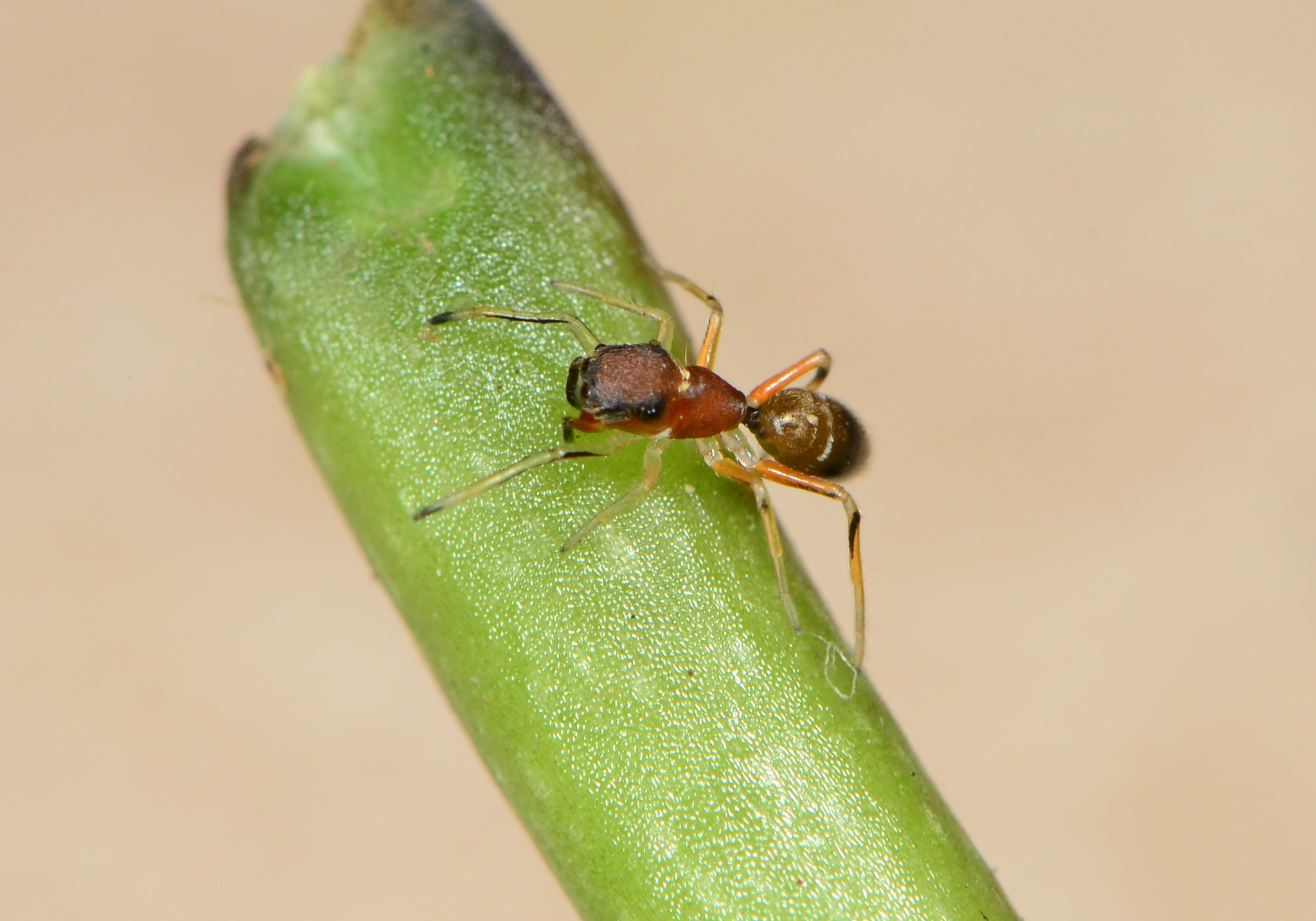
juvenile on a stalk

Belippo spiders live in the Afrotropical realm. Belippo pulchra is endemic to South Africa. It has been found in the Indian Ocean Coastal Belt and Savanna Biomes, living in KwaZulu-Natal and Limpopo Provinces, in isolated parts of the country. It is likely to be under-sampled and to have a wider species distribution. The holotype was found in 2012 on the Magoebaskloof pass at an altitude of 1,188 m (3,898 ft) above sea level. Other examples have also been found nearby. It lives in the leaf litter in forests.
