= Belippo attenuata =

Scientific classification
- Kingdom: Animalia
- Phylum: Arthropoda
- Subphylum: Chelicerata
- Class: Arachnida
- Order: Araneae
- Infraorder: Araneomorphae
- Family: Salticidae
- Genus: Belippo
- Species: B. attenuata

Binomial name
- Belippo attenuata Wesołowska & Haddad, 2014

Species of spider

Belippo attenuata is a jumping spider species in the genus Belippo that lives in Lesotho. It was first identified in 2014.
