= Belippo eburnensis =

Scientific classification
- Kingdom: Animalia
- Phylum: Arthropoda
- Subphylum: Chelicerata
- Class: Arachnida
- Order: Araneae
- Infraorder: Araneomorphae
- Family: Salticidae
- Genus: Belippo
- Species: B. eburnensis

Binomial name
- Belippo eburnensis Wesołowska & Wiśniewski, 2020

Species of jumping spider

Belippo eburnensis is a jumping spider species that lives on the forest floor in Ivory Coast. A member of the genus Belippo, spider is small, with a cephalothorax that is between 2 and 2.4 mm (0.08 and 0.09 in) long and an abdomen between 2.1 and 2.8 mm (0.08 and 0.11 in) long. The female is generally larger than the male, both resembling ants of the genus Crematogaster. It is generally black with a lighter underside and a white streak or patch on the top in the slit that divides the spider's head and thorax. The male has distinctive legs that range in color from its mainly whitish-yellow second pair to its mainly black back pair. This helps determine that the male is an example of this species rather than of a different member of the genus. The pincer-like end of its long embolus, part of its copulatory organs, can also be used to identify it. It is harder to distinguish the female.

== Taxonomy ==
Belippo eburnensis is a species of jumping spider, a member of the family Salticidae, that was first described by the arachnologists Wanda Wesołowska and Małgorzata Wiśniewski in 2020. They assigned the species to the genus Belippo, first circumscribed by Eugène Simon in 1910. In Wayne Maddison's 2015 study of spider phylogenetic classification, the genus Belippo was allocated to the tribe Myrmarachnini, named by Eugène Simon in 1901. The tribe is a member of the subclade Simonida in the clade Astioida in the subfamily Salticinae. In 2016, Jerzy Prószyński added the genus to a group of genera named Belippines, named after the genus.

== Description ==
Belippo are relatively small ant-like spiders. They often mimic ants of the genus Crematogaster. Their body is divided into two main parts: a cephalothorax and an abdomen. The male Belippo eburnensis has a cephalothorax that is between 2 and 2.1 mm (0.08 and 0.08 in) long and 0.9 and 1 mm (0.04 and 0.04 in) wide. The forward part of the cephalothorax, the spider's head, is higher and broader than its thorax; the two are divided by a slit that is marked with a brown streak. Its carapace, the hard upper part of the cephalothorax, is black and pitted. As well as a scattering of white hairs visible on its surface, there are a few long dark brown bristles on the spider's eye field and fovea. The underside of its cephalothorax, or sternum, is brown. It has dark brown chelicerae that have three teeth on their front front margin and six teeth to the rear. On the outside of the chelicerae, there is a long spine that projects forward. The remaining mouthparts are brown.

The male's abdomen is between 2.1 and 2.3 mm (0.09 in) in length and 1.0 and 1.1 mm (0.04 in) in width and has a constriction in the middle. The top is black and covered with short black hairs, with two shiny hard patches, or scuta, surrounded with white lines visible on its surface. The underside of its abdomen is grey with a large brown rectangle in the middle. It has generally dark spinnerets to spin webs. Its legs vary in color. Its front legs are mainly black, its second pair whitish-yellow, its third mainly yellow with some darker segments and its rearmost pair mainly black with dark streak on their lighter metatarsi. The front legs have seven pairs of spines and the pair immediately behind have five pairs. The difference in leg coloration helps distinguish the spider from the related Belippo ibadan.

The spider's copulatory organs also help distinguish it from others in the genus. The male has blackish hairy pedipalps that has two appendages, or apophyses, one of which is a short hook and the other consists of three small tooth-like projections. The spider's palpal bulb consists of a round tegulum with a relatively long embolus that starts at the side circles round the tegulum twice and then projects out towards the front of the spider. The end of the embolus is shaped like a pincer; this is a distinguishing feature for the species.

The female spider is slightly larger than the male with a cephalothorax that is between 2.2 and 2.4 mm (0.09 in) long and between 1.3 and 1.5 mm (0.05 and 0.06 in) wide, and an abdomen between 2.1 and 2.3 mm (0.09 in) long and between 1.4 mm (0.06 in) and 1.5 mm wide. It is generally similar to the male externally, although the light patch between the head and thorax is less clearly defined and the spider's legs are thinner, all blackish with yellow segments and have yellow stripes on the femora of the second legs. Like the male, the female spider has six teeth at the back of its chelicerae, but differs in having four teeth at the front, one lying apart from the others. It has black pedipalps. Its copulatory organs are very similar to Belippo ibadan. Its epigyne, the external visible part of its copulatory organs, has a large central depression flanked by pockets. Internally, it has long thin and meandering seminal ducts that lead to spermathecae, or receptacles, that consist of two spherical chambers, themselves connected by long ducts.

== Distribution and habitat ==
Belippo spiders live in the Afrotropical realm. Belippo eburnensis is endemic to Ivory Coast, which is where its specific name originates. The holotype was found in 2018 on Mount Toukoui near Man at an altitude of 1,200 m (3,900 ft) above sea level. Other examples have also been found nearby. It lives in the shrubs that are found on the floor between the trees in the forest.
