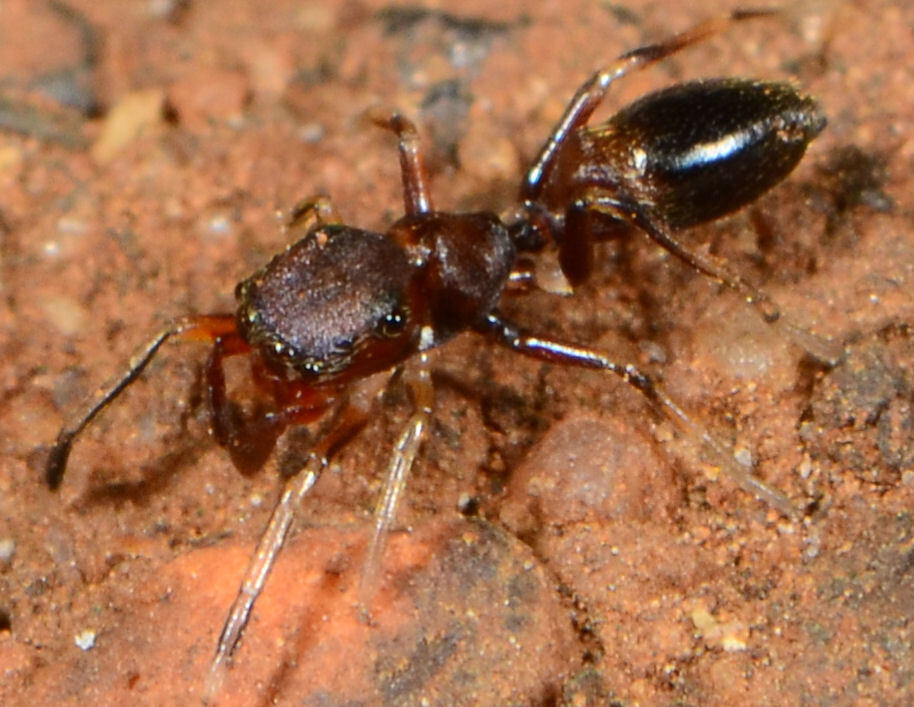
- female B. meridionalis
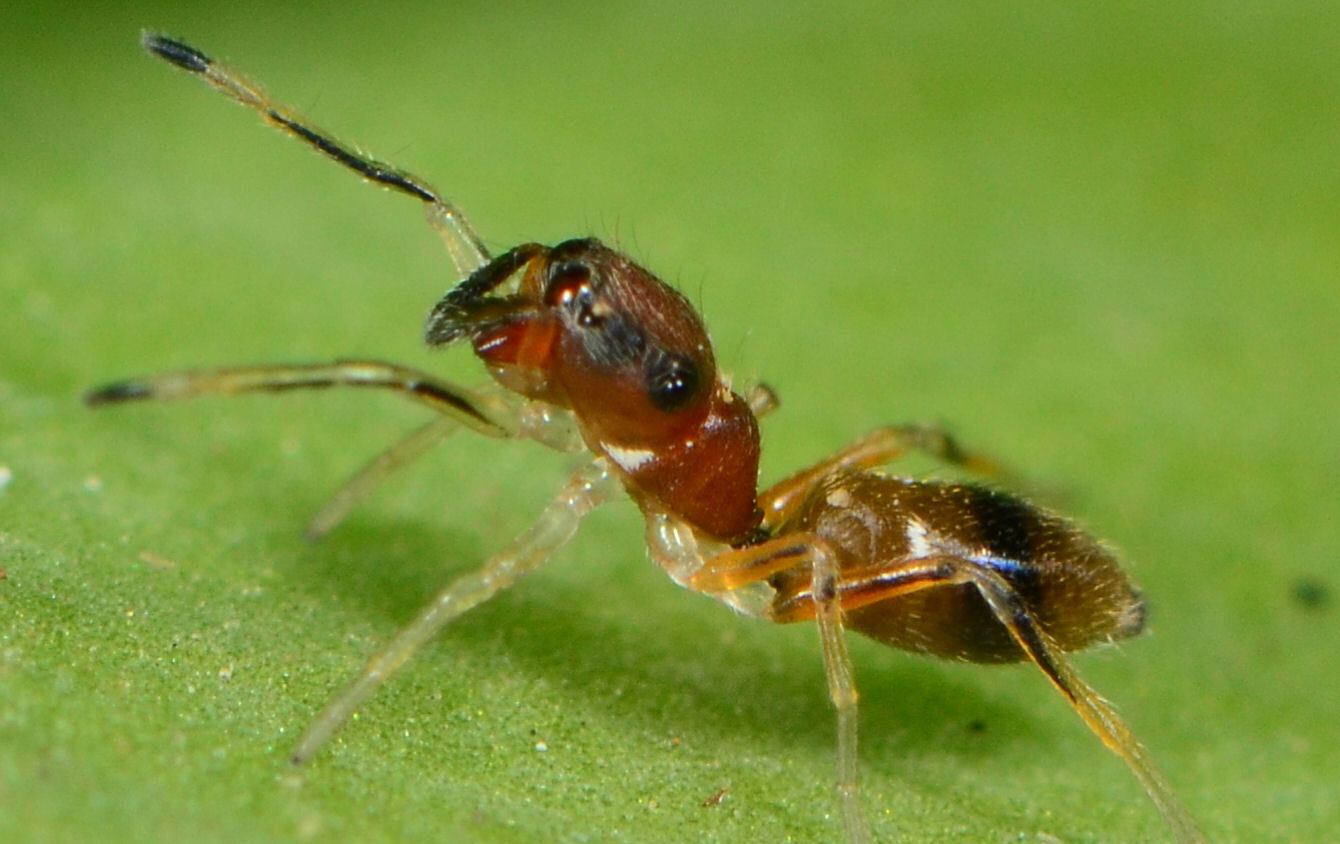
- juvenile female B. pulchra

Scientific classification
- Kingdom: Animalia
- Phylum: Arthropoda
- Subphylum: Chelicerata
- Class: Arachnida
- Order: Araneae
- Infraorder: Araneomorphae
- Family: Salticidae
- Subfamily: Salticinae
- Genus: Belippo; Simon, 1910

Type species
- B. anguina Simon, 1910

Species
- 13, see text

= Belippo =

Genus of spiders

Belippo is a genus of ant-mimicking African jumping spiders. The genus was first described by Eugène Simon (1848-1924) in 1910.

== Life style ==
These are ground-dwelling spiders, usually collected from leaf litter. They generally mimic Crematogaster ants.

== Description ==
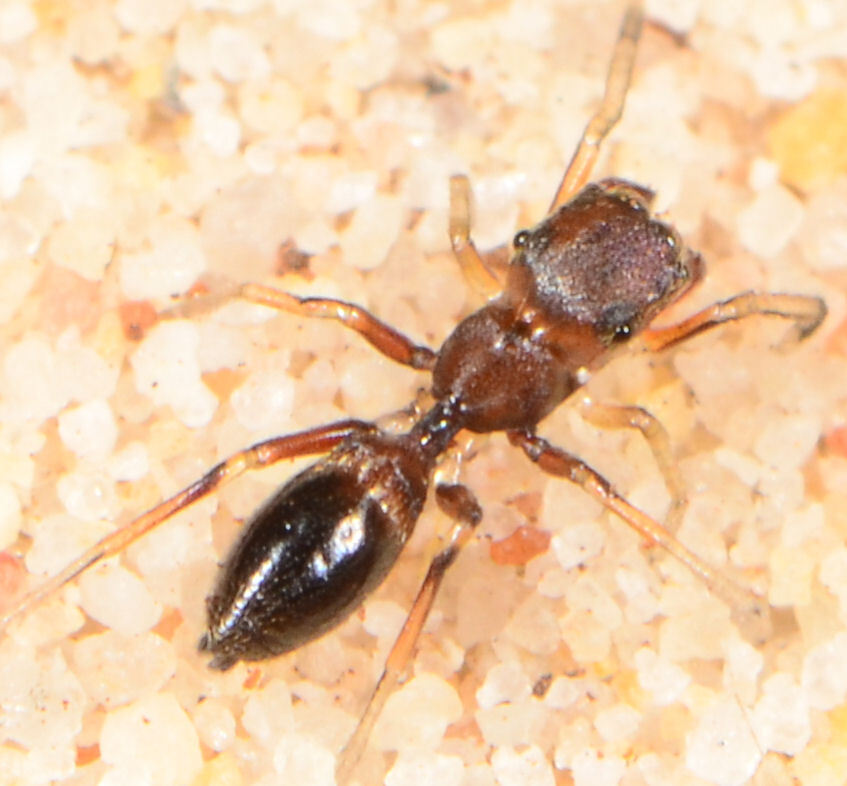
female B. meridionalis

Belippo are small ant-like spiders with elongated bodies.

The most characteristic feature of males is the movable retrolateral tibial apophysis. Females are characterized by the primary and secondary spermathecae joined by a thin, long canal. Carapace with shallow constriction, slightly higher in cephalic part, surface with punctured sculpture. Carapace with black eye field, covered in thin long colourless hairs with scattered white scales among them and long bristles near eyes. Two long trichobothria in constriction.

Chelicerae long, promargin toothless, retromargin with four teeth, fangs long. Endites, labium and sternum dark brown. Abdomen elongate. Legs slender with four pairs of long ventral spines on tibiae I and two pairs on metatarsi.

== Taxonomy ==
The genus was last revised by Fred Wanless in 1978. Since then several species have been described.

== Species ==
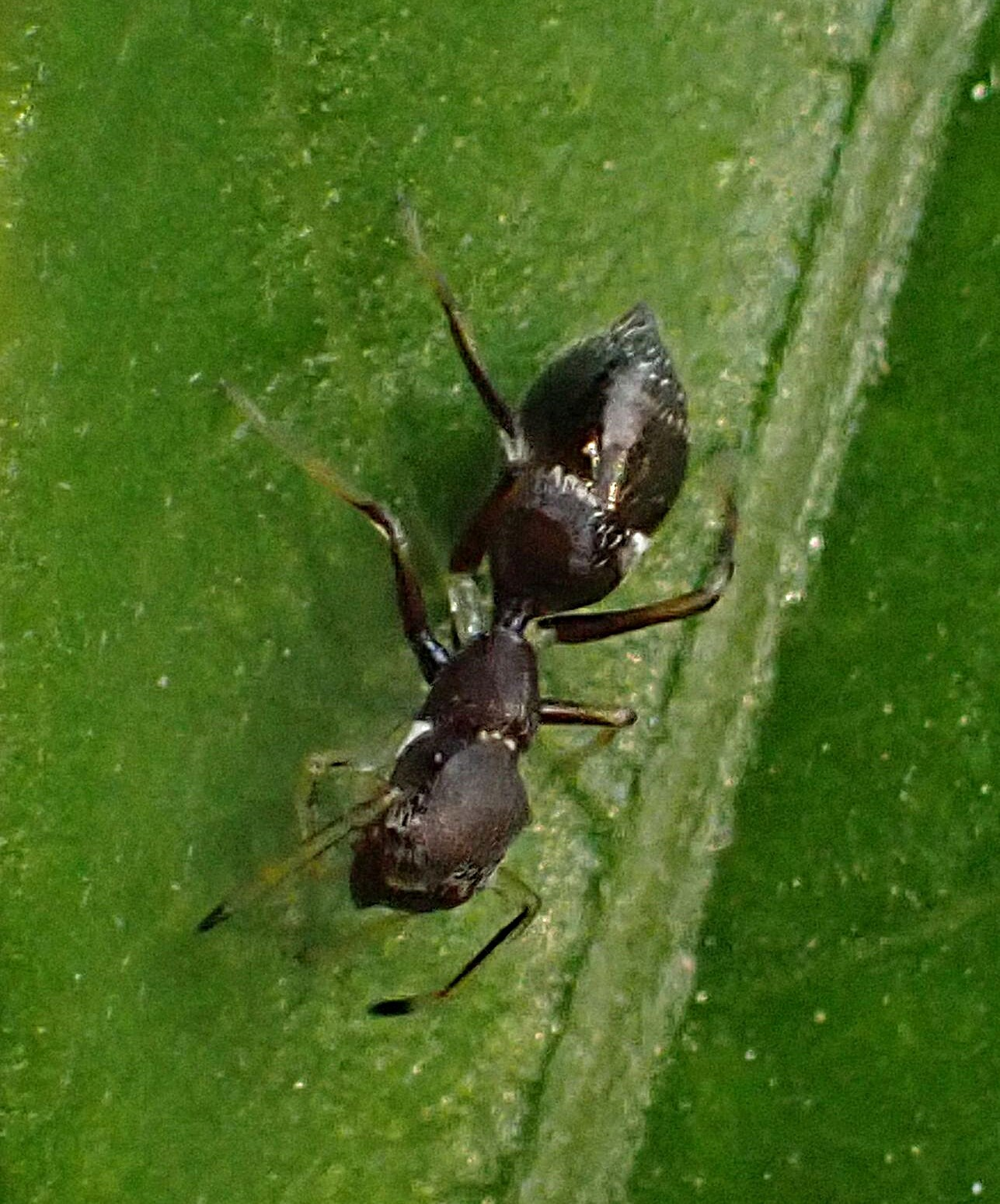
B. calcarata

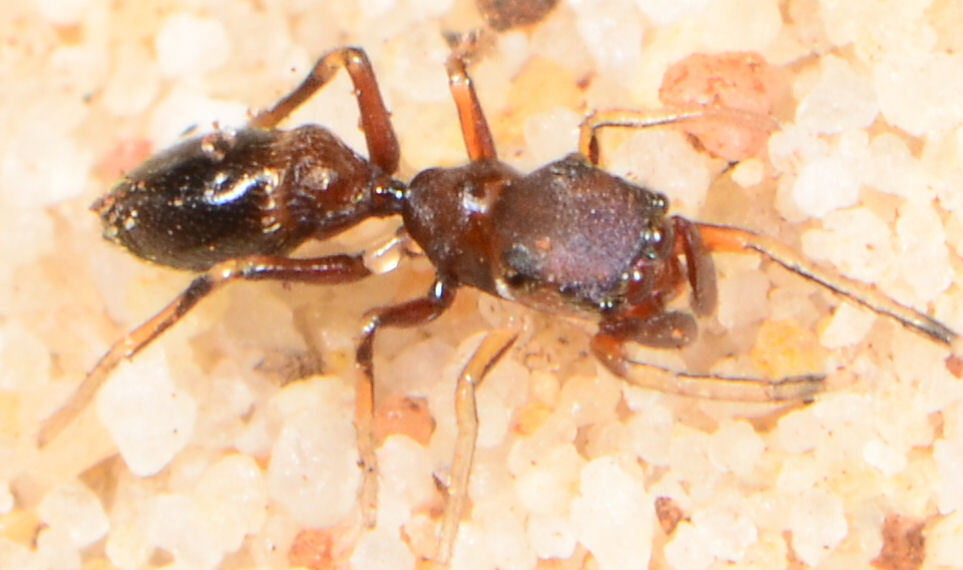
female B. meridionalis

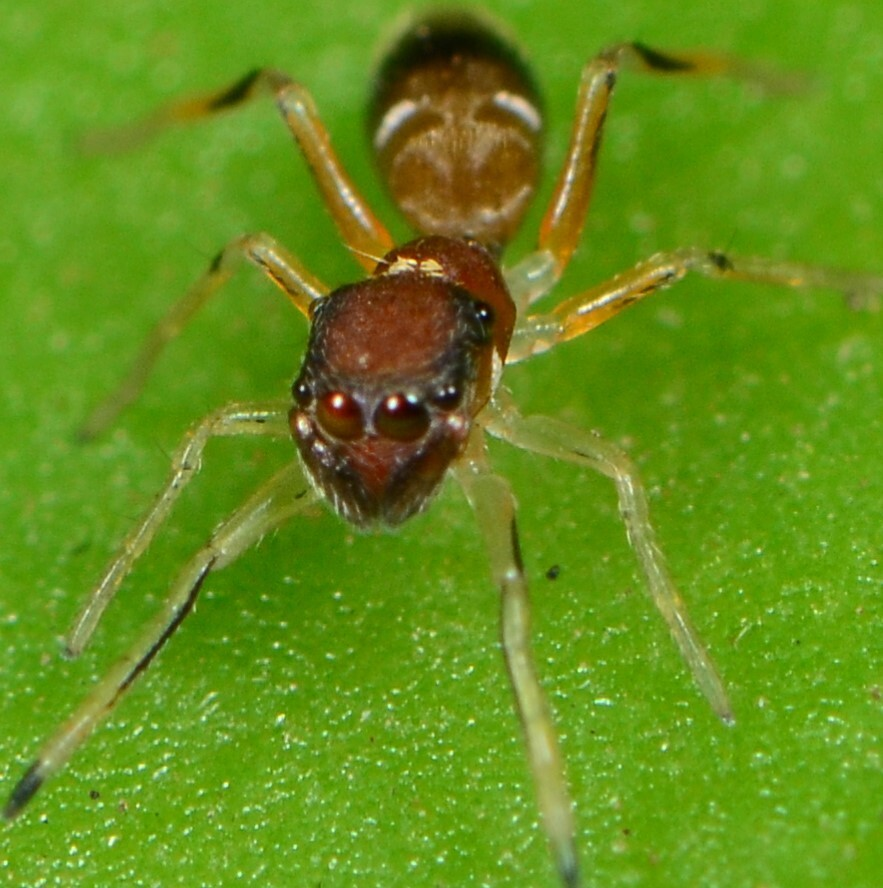
female juvenile B. pulchra

As of October 2025, this genus includes thirteen species:

- Belippo anguina Simon, 1909 – São Tomé and Príncipe (type species)
- Belippo attenuata Wesołowska & Haddad, 2014 – Lesotho
- Belippo calcarata (Roewer, 1942) – Guinea, Equatorial Guinea, DR Congo, Kenya, Angola, Mozambique, South Africa
- Belippo cygniformis Wanless, 1978 – Ghana
- Belippo eburnensis Wesołowska & Wiśniewski, 2020 – Guinea, Ivory Coast, Ghana
- Belippo elgonensis Wesołowska & Wiśniewski, 2015 – Kenya
- Belippo ibadan Wanless, 1978 – Nigeria
- Belippo meridionalis Wesołowska & Haddad, 2013 – South Africa
- Belippo milloti (Lessert, 1942) – Ivory Coast, Nigeria, DR Congo, Kenya
- Belippo nexilis (Simon, 1909) – São Tomé and Príncipe
- Belippo pulchra Haddad & Wesołowska, 2013 – South Africa
- Belippo terribilis Wesołowska & Wiśniewski, 2015 – Kenya
- Belippo viettei (Kraus, 1960) – São Tomé and Príncipe
