= Bivane Dam =

Dam in Near Vryheid, KwaZulu-Natal, South Africa

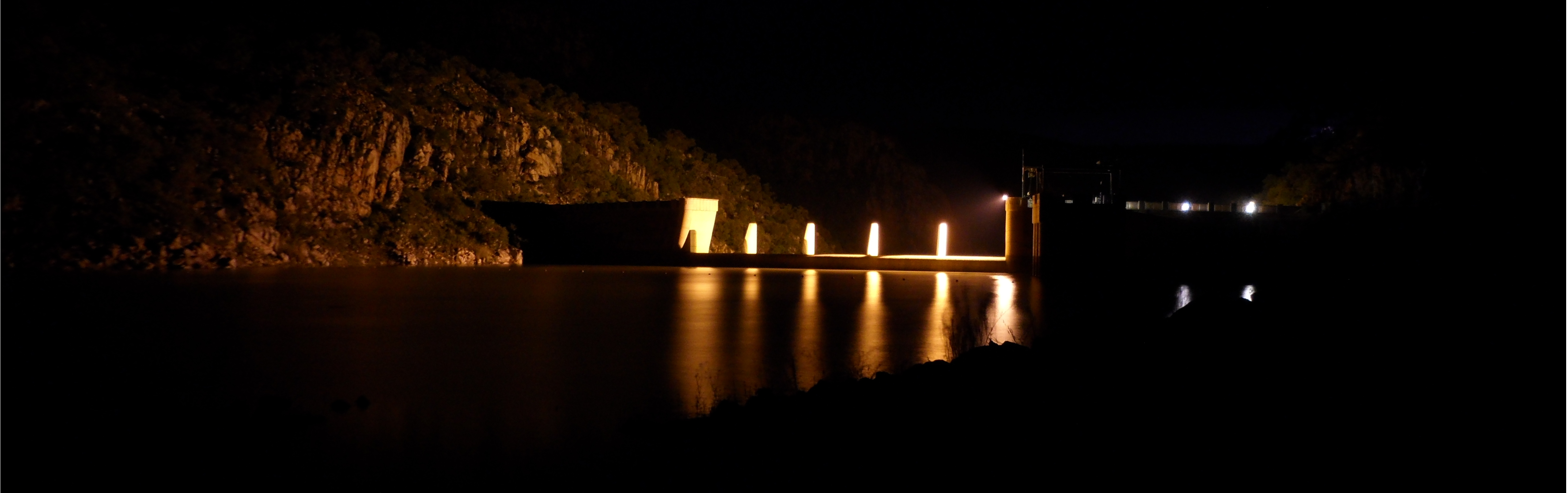
- The dam wall lit at night
- Interactive map of Bivane Dam
- Official name: Bivane Dam
- Country: South Africa
- Location: Near Vryheid, KwaZulu-Natal
- Coordinates: 27°31′10″S 31°3′15″E
- Purpose: Irrigation and domestic use
- Opening date: 2000
- Owner: Impala User Association

Dam and spillways
- Type of dam: Arch dam
- Impounds: Bivane River
- Height: 72 m (236 ft)
- Length: 180 m (590 ft)

Reservoir
- Creates: Bivane Dam Reservoir
- Total capacity: 115,000,000 m^{3} (4.1×10^{9} cu ft)

Bivane Dam (formerly known as the Paris Dam) is an arch type dam on the Bivane River, near Vryheid, KwaZulu-Natal, South Africa. It was established in 2000. Its primary purpose is for irrigation and domestic use. The owner is the Impala User Association.

Its hazard potential is ranked category 3.

== Gallery ==
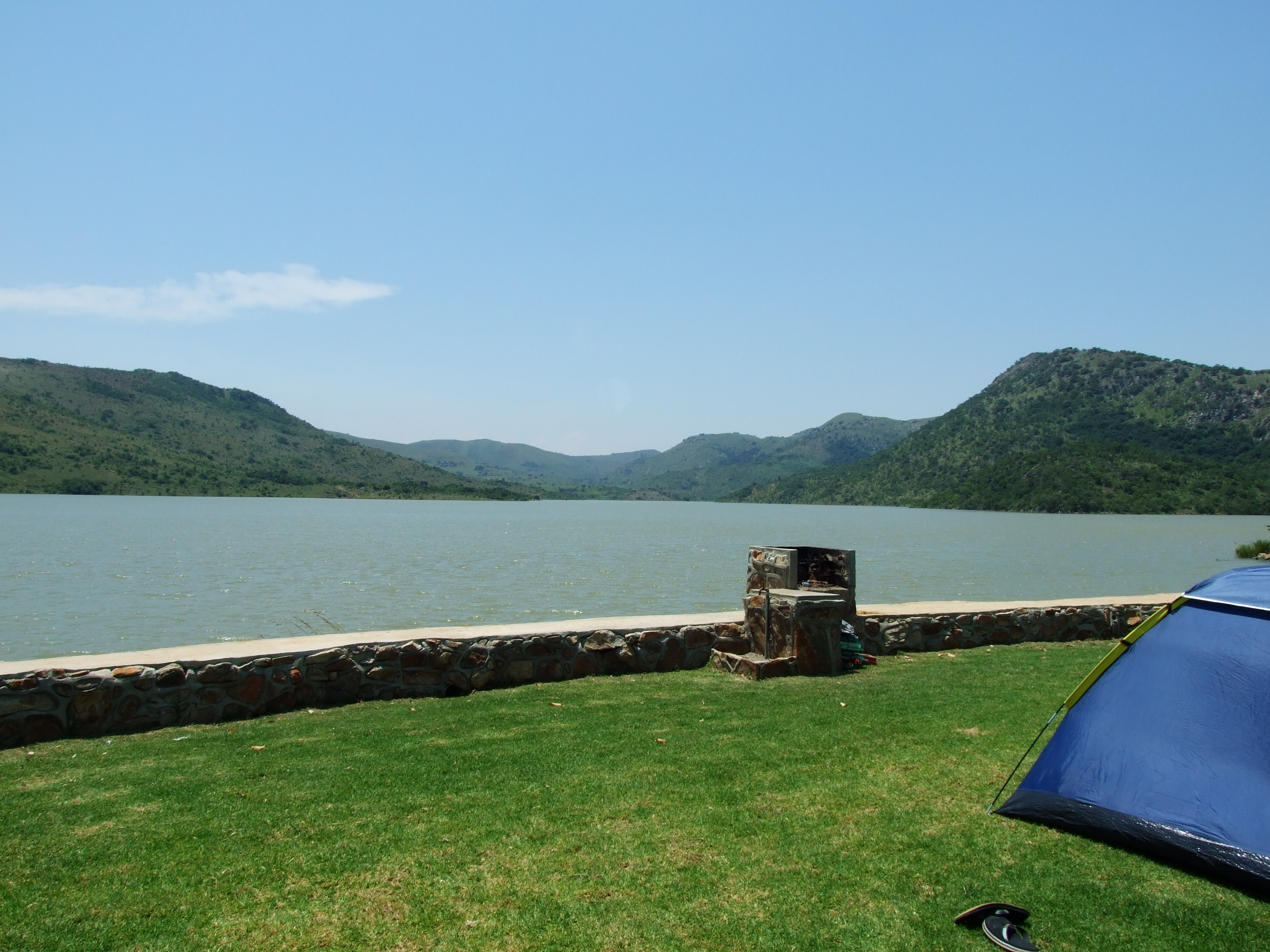
View from camping site

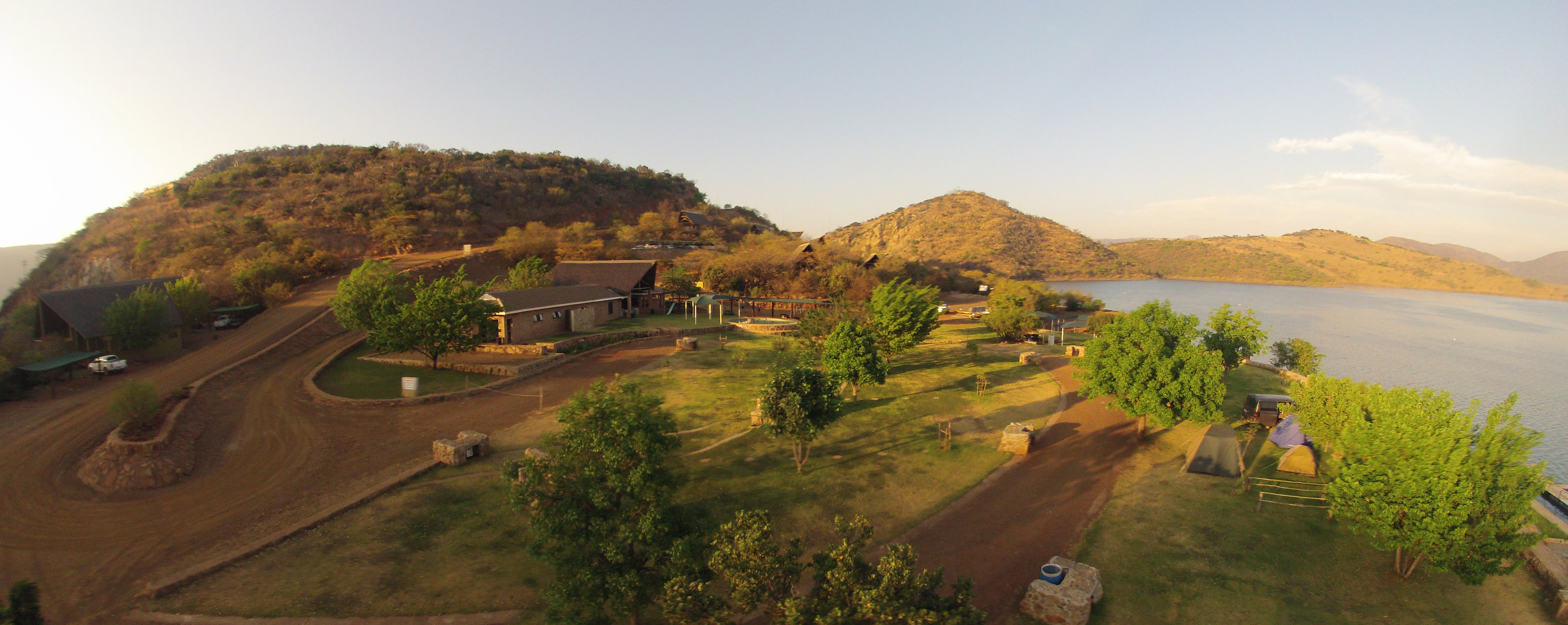
Aerial view

== See also ==
- List of reservoirs and dams in South Africa
- List of rivers of South Africa
