= Belippo elgonensis =

Scientific classification
- Kingdom: Animalia
- Phylum: Arthropoda
- Subphylum: Chelicerata
- Class: Arachnida
- Order: Araneae
- Infraorder: Araneomorphae
- Family: Salticidae
- Genus: Belippo
- Species: B. elgonensis

Binomial name
- Belippo elgonensis Wesołowska & Wiśniewski, 2015

Species of spider

Belippo elgonensis is a species of jumping spiders in the genus Belippo that lives in Kenya. It was first identified in 2015.
