= Paulpietersburg =

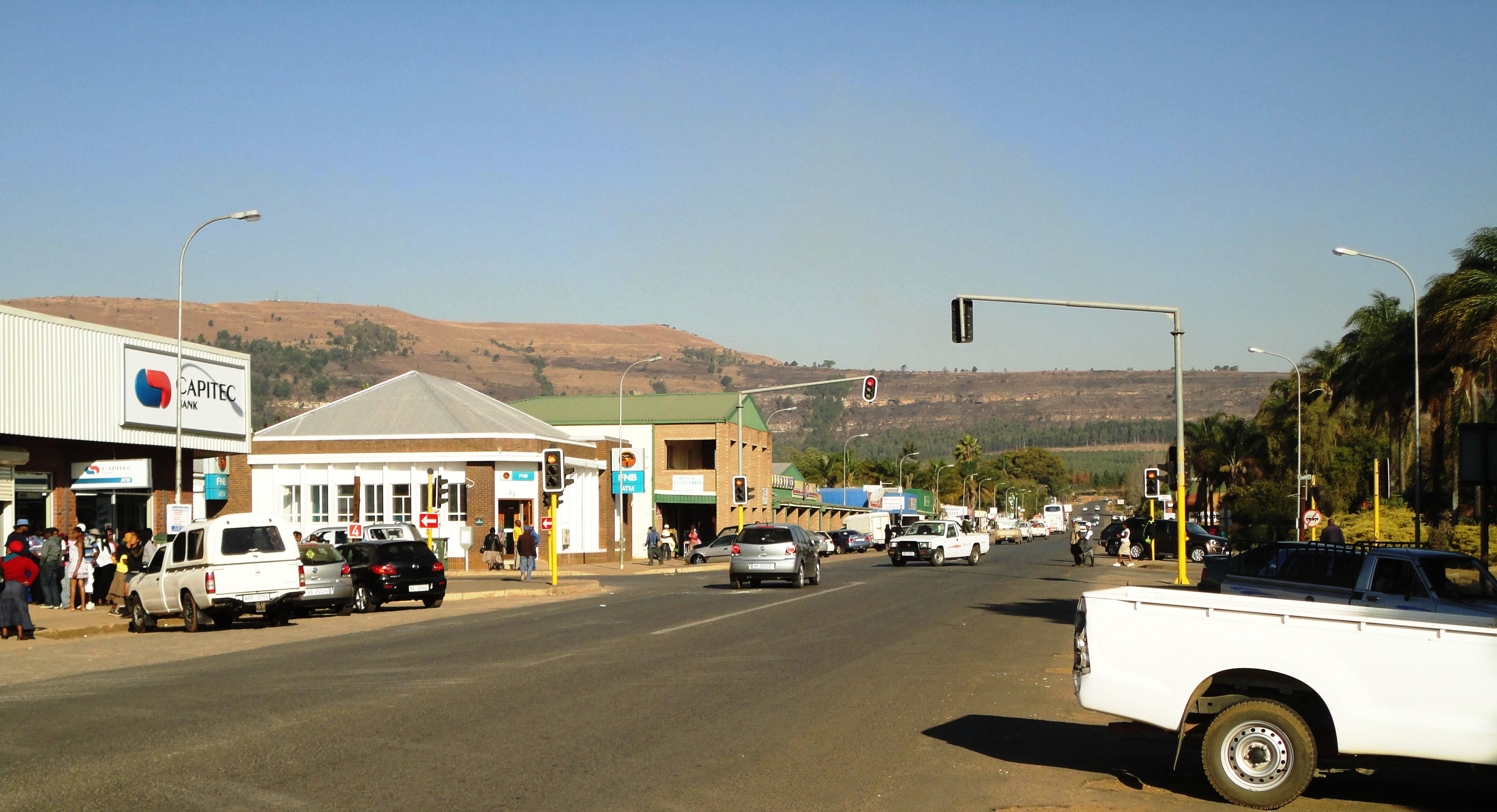
- View up Hoog Street with Dumbe hill in background

- Location within KwaZulu-Natal Location within South Africa
- Coordinates: 27°25′S 30°49′E
- Country: South Africa
- Province: KwaZulu-Natal
- District: Zululand
- Municipality: eDumbe
- Established: 1888

Government
  - Councillor: BM Nxusa (NFP)

Area
  - Total: 36.56 km^{2} (14.12 sq mi)

Population (2011)
  - Total: 1,859
  - Density: 50.85/km^{2} (131.7/sq mi)

Racial makeup (2011)
  - Black African: 56.7%
  - Coloured: 1.0%
  - Indian/Asian: 1.5%
  - White: 37.3%
  - Other: 3.6%

First languages (2011)
  - Zulu: 48.8%
  - Afrikaans: 23.1%
  - English: 11.5%
  - Other: 16.6%
- Time zone: UTC+2 (SAST)
- Postal code (street): 3180
- PO box: 3180
- Area code: 034

Paulpietersburg (Zulu: eDumbe) is a small town in KZN, South Africa. It was established in 1888 and was then part of the Transvaal Republic. It was named after then President Paul Kruger and Voortrekker hero Piet Joubert.

The town is 48 km south of Piet Retief and 151 km north-east of Dundee. It was established in 1888, proclaimed a township in 1910, and attained municipal status in 1958. Named after President Paul Kruger and General Piet Joubert, it was first called Paulpietersrust, then Paulpietersdorp, and Paulpietersburg in 1896.
