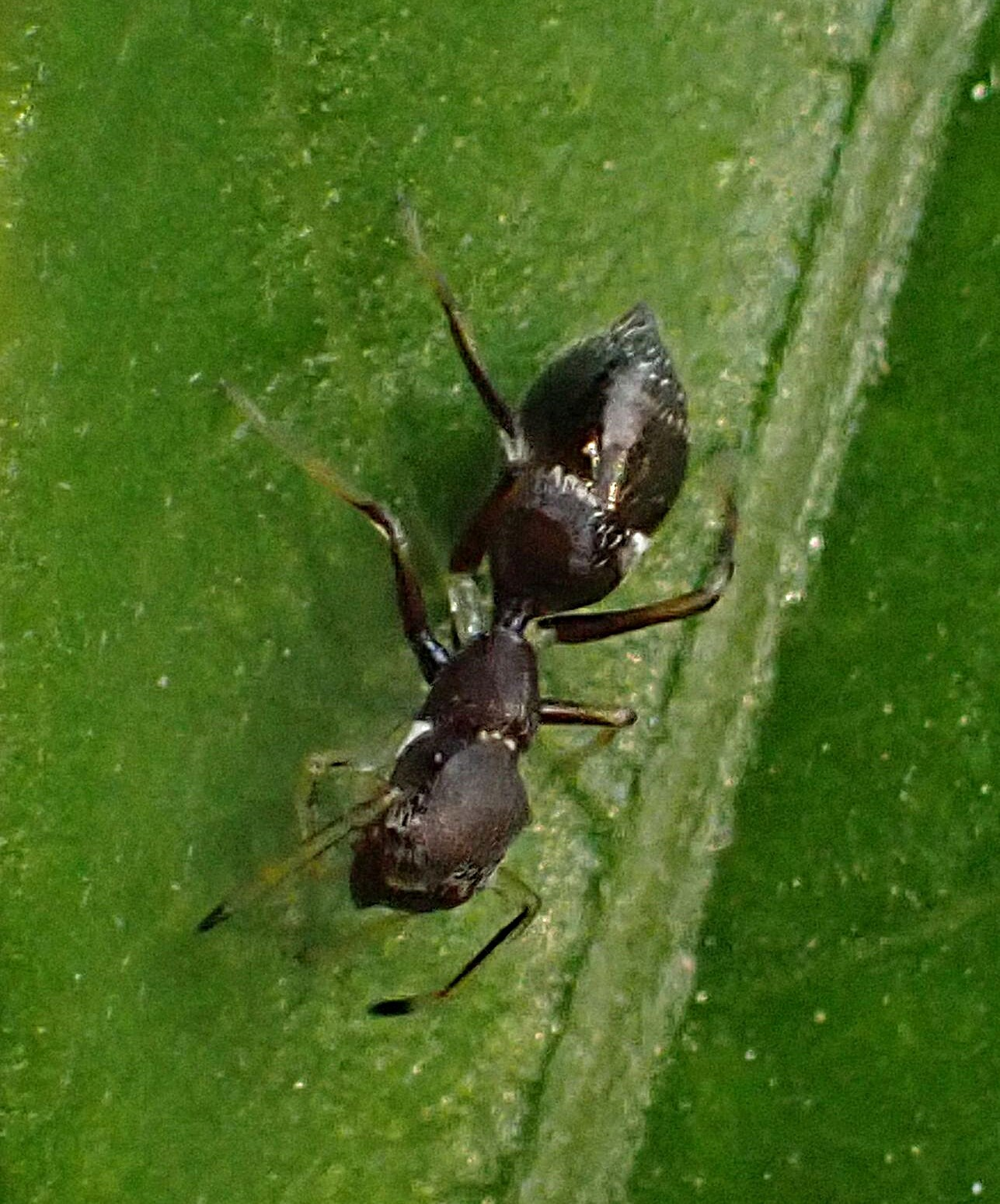
- female

Scientific classification
- Kingdom: Animalia
- Phylum: Arthropoda
- Subphylum: Chelicerata
- Class: Arachnida
- Order: Araneae
- Infraorder: Araneomorphae
- Family: Salticidae
- Genus: Belippo
- Species: B. calcarata

Binomial name
- Belippo calcarata (Roewer, 1942)

Synonyms
- Myrmarachne calcarata Roewer, 1942

= Belippo calcarata =

Bioko Belippo Jumping Spider

Species of spider

Belippo calcarata is a species of spider in the family Salticidae. It is found in Africa and is commonly known as the Bioko Belippo jumping spider.

== Distribution ==
Belippo calcarata is found in Angola, Bioko, Democratic Republic of the Congo, Equatorial Guinea, Guinea, Kenya, Mozambique and South Africa. In South Africa, it is found in KwaZulu-Natal Province and Limpopo Province.

== Habitat and ecology ==
B. calcarata is a ground-dwelling species collected from leaf litter at altitudes ranging from 88 to 1,045 m. It has been sampled from forested areas and woodlands.

== Taxonomy ==
Belippo calcarata was originally described by Roewer in 1942 as Myrmarachne calcarata from Bioko. It was transferred to Belippo and redescribed by Wanless in 1978.

== Conservation ==
Belippo calcarata is listed as Least Concern due to its wide global range across several African countries. In South Africa, it is protected in Ithala Game Reserve, Tembe Elephant Park and Lekgalameetse Nature Reserve. There are no significant threats to the species.
