= Njabuliso Simelane =

Swaziland footballer (born 1979)

Personal information
- Date of birth: 22 November 1979 (age 46)
- Place of birth: Swaziland
- Position: Goalkeeper

Senior career*
Years	Team	Apps	(Gls)
2004–2012	Green Mamba		
- Malanti Chiefs

International career
2004–2011	Swaziland	24	(0)
- * Club domestic league appearances and goals

Njabuliso Simelane (born 22 November 1979) is a Swaziland international footballer who plays as a goalkeeper. As of February 2010, he plays for Green Mamba in the Swazi Premier League and has won 16 caps for his country. He was part of the 2010 qualifier team that beat Togo 2-1, but conceded six, four of them to Emmanuel Adebayor, as Swaziland lost 6-0.

He was released by Green Mamba in 2012. While playing with Malanti Chiefs the following season, he was involved in an incident at Somhlolo National Stadium where two fans rushed the field and wrestled him for his drink.
