= Mbatha =

Mbatha is a surname. Notable people with the surname include:

- Gugu Mbatha-Raw (born 1983), British actress
- Lindokuhle Mbatha (born 1985), South African footballer
- Nomzamo Mbatha (born 1990), South African actress, television personality, and human rights activist
- Zamani Mbatha (born 1998), South African actor
- Lawrence Mbatha (born 1968), Chief of the South African Army
