= Simelane =

Simelane is a Swazi and South African surname. Notable people with the surname include:

- Andile Simelane (born 2003), South African cricketer
- Babes Wodumo (born Bongekile Simelane, 1994), South African musician
- Constance Simelane (1942–2025), Swazi politician
- David Thabo Simelane (born 1956), Swazi serial killer
- Eudy Simelane (1977–2008), South African footballer
- Isaac Simelane (born 1967), Swazi long-distance runner
- Lojiba Simelane, Swazi monarch
- Menzi Simelane, South African lawyer
- Musa Simelane (born 1974), Swazi boxer
- Njabuliso Simelane (born 1979), Swazi footballer
- Nomagugu Simelane (born 1976), South African lawyer and politician
- Precious Simelane (1977–2005), South African actress
- Somnjalose Simelane, Swazi monarch
- Thembi Simelane (born 1973), South African politician
- Tiffany Simelane (1988–2009), Swazi beauty queen
- Tumelo Simelane (born 1995), South African cricketer
- Wandisile Simelane (born 1998), South African rugby player
- Lucia Simelane - Ochan ( Lucia Ochan ) born 1980 South African Beauty Queen ( Mrs Africa Globe, Mrs South Africa Curve Globe, World Winner Mrs Curve Globe) & Play Your Part Ambassador - Brand South Africa & UN Honoree

== See also ==
- Democratic Alliance v President of the Republic of South Africa and Others, a 2012 South African legal case nicknamed for one of the respondents, Menzi Simelane
