= Zungu =

Zungu is a surname. Notable people with the surname include:

- Bongani Zungu (born 1992), South African footballer
- Mussa Zungu (born 1952), Tanzanian politician
- Philani Zungu, South African activist
- Vincent Mduduzi Zungu (born 1966), South African bishop
- Sandile Zithulele Zungu Maskandi Artist
