= Belippo anguina =

Scientific classification
- Kingdom: Animalia
- Phylum: Arthropoda
- Subphylum: Chelicerata
- Class: Arachnida
- Order: Araneae
- Infraorder: Araneomorphae
- Family: Salticidae
- Genus: Belippo
- Species: B. anguina

Binomial name
- Belippo anguina Simon, 1910

Species of spider

Belippo anguina is an endemic jumping spider species that lives in São Tomé and Príncipe. It was first identified in 1910 by Simon from a juvenile specimen and is the type species for the genus Belippo. Its female holotype measures 4 mm.
