= Ulundi =

Ulundi oLundi
- Location within KwaZulu-Natal Location within South Africa
- Coordinates: 28°19′S 31°25′E
- Country: South Africa
- Province: KwaZulu-Natal
- District: Zululand
- Municipality: Ulundi

Area
  - Total: 3,251 km^{2} (1,255 sq mi)
- Elevation: 540 m (1,770 ft)

Population (2024)
  - Total: 30,828
  - Density: 9.483/km^{2} (24.56/sq mi)

Racial makeup (2011)
  - Black African: 98.9%
  - Coloured: 0.3%
  - Indian/Asian: 0.2%
  - White: 0.2%
  - Other: 0.4%

First languages (2011)
  - Zulu: 93.4%
  - English: 2.6%
  - S. Ndebele: 1.1%
  - Other: 2.9%
- Time zone: UTC+2 (SAST)
- PO box: 3838
- Area code: 035

Ulundi, also known as Mahlabathini, is a town which lies under the Ulundi Local Municipality in the Zululand District Municipality. At one time the capital of the Zulu Kingdom in South Africa and later the capital of the Bantustan of KwaZulu, Ulundi now lies in KwaZulu-Natal Province (of which, from 1994 to 2004, it alternated with Pietermaritzburg as the provincial capital). Ulundi's 2025 population is now estimated at 31,185. In 2001, the population of Ulundi was 23,649. Ulundi has grown by 4,647 in the last year, which represents a 1.16% annual change. The town now includes Ulundi Airport, a three-star hotel, and some museums amongst its sights.

== Tourism and Attractions ==
Located just minutes from the town center, the Ulundi Museum offers a rich glimpse into Zulu heritage and regional history. Travelers can follow the R700 route to reach the Ondini Cultural Reserve, a site of historical significance and traditional architecture. Just 10 km outside Ulundi lies the eMakhosini Ophathe Heritage Park, known for its biodiversity and royal burial grounds. For wildlife enthusiasts, the Hluhluwe–iMfolozi Park is easily accessible via the newly established Cengeni Gate, situated approximately 35 km from town.

== History ==
When Cetshwayo became king of the Zulus on 1 September 1873, he created, as was customary, a new capital for the nation, naming it "Ulundi" ("The high place"). On 4 July 1879, in the Battle of Ulundi (the final battle of the Anglo-Zulu War), the British Army captured the royal kraal and razed it to the ground.

Nearby is Ondini, where King Mpande, Cetshwayo's father, had his kraal. A large Zulu hut now is on the site.

== Climate ==
Ulundi experiences a subtropical climate characterised by distinct seasonal patterns. Summers are long, hot, humid, and accompanied by frequent rainfall, while winters are brief, cool, and predominantly dry. The region enjoys mostly clear skies throughout the year.

Annual temperatures typically range from 10 °C to 31 °C, with extremes rarely falling below 7 °C or exceeding 34 °C. This stable temperature profile contributes to Ulundi’s suitability for year-round outdoor activities and agriculture.

Köppen-Geiger climate classification system classifies its climate as humid subtropical (Cfa).

Climate data for Ulundi
| Month | Jan | Feb | Mar | Apr | May | Jun | Jul | Aug | Sep | Oct | Nov | Dec | Year |
|---|---|---|---|---|---|---|---|---|---|---|---|---|---|
| Mean daily maximum °C (°F) | 28.2 (82.8) | 28.3 (82.9) | 27.3 (81.1) | 25.9 (78.6) | 24.3 (75.7) | 22.4 (72.3) | 22.5 (72.5) | 23.8 (74.8) | 25.0 (77.0) | 25.7 (78.3) | 26.3 (79.3) | 27.6 (81.7) | 25.6 (78.1) |
| Daily mean °C (°F) | 22.9 (73.2) | 23.1 (73.6) | 22.1 (71.8) | 20.3 (68.5) | 18.2 (64.8) | 16.0 (60.8) | 16.1 (61.0) | 17.2 (63.0) | 18.8 (65.8) | 19.9 (67.8) | 20.9 (69.6) | 22.1 (71.8) | 19.8 (67.6) |
| Mean daily minimum °C (°F) | 17.6 (63.7) | 17.9 (64.2) | 16.9 (62.4) | 14.8 (58.6) | 12.2 (54.0) | 9.7 (49.5) | 9.7 (49.5) | 10.7 (51.3) | 12.6 (54.7) | 14.1 (57.4) | 15.6 (60.1) | 16.7 (62.1) | 14.0 (57.3) |
| Average precipitation mm (inches) | 123 (4.8) | 109 (4.3) | 90 (3.5) | 49 (1.9) | 28 (1.1) | 18 (0.7) | 18 (0.7) | 30 (1.2) | 56 (2.2) | 98 (3.9) | 110 (4.3) | 115 (4.5) | 844 (33.1) |
Source: Climate-Data.org (altitude: 535m)
