= EDumbe Local Municipality =

Coordinates: 27°25′19″S 30°49′06″E

eDumbe
- Local municipality
- Seal

- Location in KwaZulu-Natal
- Country: South Africa
- Province: KwaZulu-Natal
- District: Zululand
- Seat: Paulpietersburg
- Wards: 10

Government
  - Type: Municipal council

Area
  - Total: 1,943 km^{2} (750 sq mi)

Population (2011)
  - Total: 82,053
  - Density: 42.23/km^{2} (109.4/sq mi)

Racial makeup (2011)
  - Black African: 97.8%
  - Coloured: 0.1%
  - Indian/Asian: 0.2%
  - White: 1.8%

First languages (2011)
  - Zulu: 93.5%
  - English: 1.3%
  - Southern Ndebele: 1.2%
  - Afrikaans: 1.1%
  - Other: 2.9%
- Time zone: UTC+2 (SAST)
- Municipal code: KZN261

eDumbe Municipality (Zulu: UMasipala wase Dumbe) is a local municipality within the Zululand District Municipality, in the KwaZulu-Natal province of South Africa. The municipality is named after the Dumbe mountain.

Only 23% of the municipality's population live in urban areas, while 77% live in the rural hinterland of the municipality. This factor has severe implications on actual service delivery and the cost thereof. Most settlements developed organically and are unplanned, it lacks basic services and facilities and provide limited opportunities for economic development.

== Main places ==
The 2001 census divided the municipality into the following main places:

Place	Code	Area (km^{2})	Population
Bilanyoni	52701	294.31	41,289
Dumbe	52702	2.67	6,942
Mthethwa	52704	69.25	9,471
Paulpietersburg	52705	2.20	1,462
Pongola Bush Nature Reserve	52706	8.75	197
Remainder of the municipality	52703	1,570.30	22,868

== Politics ==
The municipal council consists of nineteen members elected by mixed-member proportional representation. Ten councillors are elected by first-past-the-post voting in ten wards, while the remaining nine are chosen from party lists so that the total number of party representatives is proportional to the number of votes received.

In the election of 4 November 2026, the Inkatha Freedom Party won a plurality of 6 seats.

The following table shows the results of the election.

Party	Ward			List			Total seats
Party	Votes	%	Seats	Votes	%	Seats	Total seats
Inkatha Freedom Party	8,188	32.25	6	8,193	32.24	0	6
uMkhonto weSizwe Party	6,663	26.24	3	6,780	26.68	2	5
African National Congress	4,530	17.84	1	4,429	17.43	2	3
National Freedom Party	1,880	7.40	0	1,793	7.06	2	2
National Peoples Ambassadors	993	3.91	0	1,020	4.01	1	1
Democratic Alliance	859	3.38	0	990	3.90	1	1
Economic Freedom Fighters	925	3.64	0	904	3.56	1	1
9 other parties	1,353	5.33	0	1,301	5.12	0	0
Total	25,391	100.00	10	25,410	100.00	9	19
Valid votes	25,391	98.86		25,410	98.92		
Invalid/blank votes	294	1.14		278	1.08		
Total votes	25,685	100.00		25,688	100.00		
Registered voters/turnout	44,608	57.58		44,608	57.59		
