= Zululand District Municipality =

Zululand
- District municipality
- Seal

- Location in KwaZulu-Natal
- Coordinates: 28°19′S 31°25′E
- Country: South Africa
- Province: KwaZulu-Natal
- Seat: Ulundi
- Local municipalities: List: eDumbe; uPhongolo; Abaqulusi; Nongoma; Ulundi

Government
  - Type: Municipal council
  - Mayor: Thulasizwe Buthelezi

Area
  - Total: 14,799 km^{2} (5,714 sq mi)

Population (2011)
  - Total: 803,575
  - Density: 54.299/km^{2} (140.63/sq mi)

Racial makeup (2011)
  - Black African: 98.0%
  - Coloured: 0.2%
  - Indian/Asian: 0.2%
  - White: 1.4%

First languages (2011)
  - Zulu: 94.3%
  - English: 1.5%
  - Afrikaans: 1.3%
  - Southern Ndebele: 1.1%
  - Other: 1.8%
- Time zone: UTC+2 (SAST)
- Municipal code: DC26

The Zululand District Municipality (Zulu: UMasipala wesiFunda seZululand) is one of the 11 districts of the KwaZulu-Natal province of South Africa. Its seat is Ulundi. As of 2011, a majority of its 803,575 inhabitants spoke isiZulu. The district code is DC26.

== Geography ==
=== Neighbours ===
Zululand is surrounded by:

- Amajuba to the north-west (DC25)
- Gert Sibande in Mpumalanga to the north (DC30)
- The kingdom of Eswatini to the north
- Umkhanyakude to the east (DC27)
- Umzinyathi to the south-west (DC24)
- uThungulu to the south (DC28)

=== Local municipalities ===
The district contains the following local municipalities:

Local municipality	Population	%
Ulundi	212 972	26.47%
Nongoma	198 447	24.67%
Abaqulusi	191 020	23.75%
uPhongolo	119 786	14.89%
eDumbe	82 241	10.22%

== Demographics ==
The following statistics are from the 2001 census.

Language	Population	%
IsiZulu	779,206	96.86%
Afrikaans	11,382	1.41%
English	5,246	0.65%
Sesotho	2,297	0.29%
IsiNdebele	1,684	0.21%
IsiXhosa	1,130	0.14%
Sepedi	980	0.12%
SiSwati	946	0.12%
Other	916	0.11%
Setswana	409	0.05%
Xitsonga	142	0.02%
Tshivenda	128	0.02%

=== Gender ===
Gender	Population	%
Female	434 244	53.98%
Male	370 212	46.02%

=== Ethnic group ===
Ethnic group	Population	%
African	788 551	98.02%
White	13 769	1.71%
Coloured	1 521	0.19%
Indian/Asian	615	0.08%

=== Age ===
Age	Population	%
000 - 004	103 541	2%
005 - 009	116 193	14.44%
010 - 014	119 925	14.91%
015 - 019	111 383	13.85%
020 - 024	69 637	8.66%
025 - 029	50 739	6.31%
030 - 034	40 514	5.04%
035 - 039	38 739	4.82%
040 - 044	33 628	4.18%
045 - 049	27 697	3.44%
050 - 054	21 735	2.70%
055 - 059	16 125	2.00%
060 - 064	16 825	2.09%
065 - 069	12 309	1.53%
070 - 074	11 606	1.44%
075 - 079	6 390	0.79%
080 - 084	4 962	0.62%
085 - 089	1 300	0.16%
090 - 094	647	0.08%
095 - 099	440	0.05%
100 plus	121	0.02%

== Politics ==
=== Election results ===
Election results for Zululand in the South African general election, 2004.

- Population 18 and over: 394 233 [49.01% of total population]
- Total votes: 218 270 [27.13% of total population]
- Voting % estimate: 55.37% votes as a % of population 18 and over

Party	Votes	%
Inkatha Freedom Party	169 028	77.44%
African National Congress	32 688	14.98%
Democratic Alliance	8 831	4.05%
African Christian Democratic Party	2 379	1.09%
United Democratic Movement	1 025	0.47%
Freedom Front Plus	845	0.39%
New National Party	531	0.24%
Independent Democrats	483	0.22%
Azanian People's Organisation	365	0.17%
Pan African Congress	231	0.11%
Keep It Straight and Simple Party	220	0.10%
United Christian Democratic Party	220	0.10%
Peace and Justice Congress	210	0.10%
Socialist Party of Azania	188	0.09%
Christian Democratic Party	169	0.08%
TOP	167	0.08%
NA	160	0.07%
EMSA	155	0.07%
Minority Front	152	0.07%
UF	141	0.06%
New Labour Party	82	0.04%
Total	218 270	100.00%

== See also ==
- Municipal Demarcation Board
