= Zungeni Mountain skirmish =

1879 skirmish between British and Zulu forces

- Part of the Anglo-Zulu War
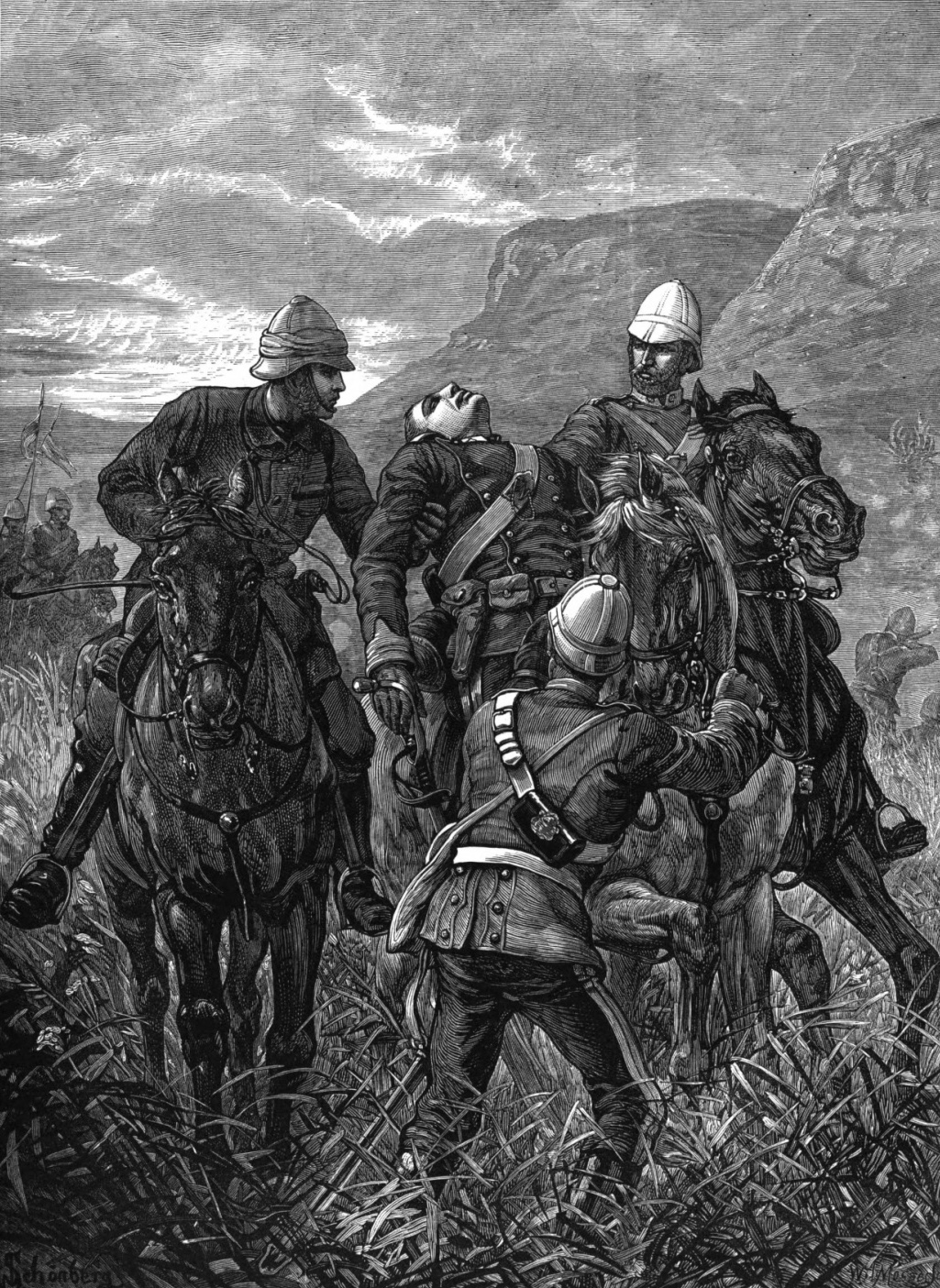
- Death of Lieutenant Frith, as depicted by Melton Prior in the Illustrated London News of 2 August 1879. Frith is supported in the saddle by a civilian and a fellow officer of the 17th Lancers; a trooper holds the bridle of Frith's horse.
Date	5 June 1879
Location	Zululand 28°17′30″S 30°55′30″E
Result	Inconclusive

Belligerents
British Empire	Zulu Kingdom

Commanders and leaders
(United Kingdom of Great Britain and Ireland) Frederick Marshall (United Kingdom of Great Britain and Ireland) Redvers Buller	Unknown

Strength
800 mounted troops	300 irregular infantry

Casualties and losses
One officer killed At least two men wounded	At least 25 men killed
- Approximate location in present-day South Africa

The Zungeni Mountain skirmish took place on 5 June 1879 between British and Zulu forces during the second invasion of Zululand, in what is now South Africa, in the later stages of the Anglo-Zulu War. British irregular horse commanded by Colonel Redvers Buller discovered a force of 300 Zulus at the settlement of eZulaneni near Zungeni Mountain. (Note: In most English language sources "Zungeni Mountain" is used to describe this location. Some use eZungeni Hill or eZungeni Mountain, following the use of the locative "e-" prefix in the Zulu language to denote "place of". The contemporary British Army List uses "affair at Erzungayan" to refer to the skirmish. eZulaneni was a collection of four imiZi (civilian homesteads, singular: umuZi) located around 400 yards (370 m) to the west of the mountain. An umuZi was formed of beehive-shaped grass huts arranged in a circle around a central cattle kraal and enclosed within a palisade. Each umuZi housed a headman, his wives, children and retainers. They should not be confused with the amaKhanda, the much larger military homesteads (of 150-1,500 huts) that served as assembly points for the iButho regiments.) The horsemen charged towards and scattered the Zulus before burning the settlement. Buller's men withdrew after coming under fire from Zulus who threatened to surround them.

Buller's men were joined by more irregulars and a force of British regular cavalry, the latter under the command of Major-General Frederick Marshall. Two squadrons of the 17th (The Duke of Cambridge's Own) Lancers, led by Colonel Drury Drury-Lowe, approached the Zulu position. They could not close with the Zulus, who were in an area of long grass and bushes, and Zulu fire killed the 17th Lancers' adjutant, Lieutenant Frederick John Cokayne Frith. Drury-Lowe ordered some of his men to dismount and return fire. When the Zulus threatened to outflank the British, Marshall ordered a withdrawal. Aside from Frith, British casualties included two irregulars wounded; two months after the battle, the remains of 25 Zulus were discovered on the battlefield. After the skirmish, the British paused to fortify their camp before proceeding further into Zululand. They then decisively defeated the Zulu in the 4 July Battle of Ulundi.

== Background ==
The British High Commissioner for Southern Africa, Sir Henry Bartle Frere, sought to annex the independent Zulu Kingdom as part of a plan to form a confederation of colonies in southern Africa. Frere seized upon a legal dispute in July 1878 involving Zulu chief Sihayo kaXongo. Two of the chief's wives had left him and escaped across the border into the British Colony of Natal. Sihayo's sons then led an armed band into the colony that retrieved the women for execution. In December 1878, Frere mobilised British troops on the borders of Zululand and presented Cetshwayo with an ultimatum whose terms required the turning over of Sihayo's sons, changes to the Zulu judicial system, the admission of Christian missionaries and the abolition of the Zulu social/army system known as iButho. (Note: The iButho system, established by Shaka, separated men into age-grouped regiments based in barracks spread across the country, which served as focal points of royal authority and a pool of labour in peacetime. When granted permission by the king to marry, around age 40, the men were released to the control of local chiefs, but remained liable for recall as a form of reserve. In times of war, they were called up to form the royal army, though some chiefs retained men for their own use.) The ultimatum demanded radical change in the Zulu way of life, and it was intended by Frere that Cetshwayo would reject it.

Although he could not comply with the British terms, particularly the abolition of the iButho, Cetshwayo made some attempts at conciliation, sending representatives and cattle to the British. When these were rejected, Cetshwayo made preparations for a defensive war. He ordered the regiments, set to assemble at the Zulu capital of Ulundi on 8 January for the umKhosi (First Fruits) ceremony, to come prepared for combat. By this time the number of men liable for service in the army numbered around 42,000-44,000, out of a population of around 300,000. Around 25,000 assembled at Ulundi for the ceremony and were formed into the royal army. Although there were around 20,000 firearms in Zulu possession by the start of the war, most were obsolete muzzle-loading muskets and the men were not trained in their use. (Note: Zulu firearms included many sold off as British Army surplus, ranging from the Napoleonic-era smooth-bored Brown Bess musket through to the Pattern 1853 Enfield rifle-musket. Very few Africans in this period could afford to equip themselves with the most modern breech-loading rifles, which allowed a higher rate of fire and easier skirmishing from a prone or kneeling position. Among the Zulu, weapons tended to be in poor repair, gunpowder and ammunition tended to be low quality and in short supply, and formal musketry training was non-existent. British accounts from Zulu War battlefields note the high volume of fire from the Zulus, with little effect. British infantry were armed with the 1875 breech-loading Martini–Henry rifle, effective to a range of 500 yards (460 m) and notable for its stopping power. Regular cavalry were equipped with the similar but slightly shorter Martini–Henry carbine, in addition to their melee weapon (lance or sword). British irregulars carried a mix of breech-loading carbines including the Martini–Henry, the Swinburn–Henry and the Snider–Enfield.) Zulu practice was to use them as secondary weapons, in place of the traditional assegai throwing spear, and to be discarded in favour of closing with the enemy to allow use of the iklwa stabbing spear.

== British invasions of Zululand ==
When the ultimatum expired, British forces under Lieutenant-General Lord Chelmsford invaded Zululand in three columns. (Note: The ultimatum expired on 10 January. The Left Column had entered territory disputed between Zululand and Transvaal on 6 January (in the British view this did not constitute a contravention of the terms of the ultimatum) and began offensive action on 10 January. The Centre Column crossed from Natal into Zululand at Rorke's Drift on 11 January. The Right Column crossed from Natal into Zululand at the Lower Drift, close to the mouth of the Tugela River, on 12 January.) The British Centre Column attacked Sihayo's homestead near the Natal border on 12 January but faced determined resistance. On 22 January, the Zulu royal army attacked the British camp at Isandlwana, effectively wiping it out and ending the first invasion. With the Right Column besieged by the Zulu at Eshowe and the Left Column engaged near Kambula, Chelmsford requested reinforcements be sent from Britain. These included a cavalry brigade formed by the 1st King's Dragoon Guards and the 17th (The Duke of Cambridge's Own) Lancers under the command of Major-General Frederick Marshall.

Chelmsford relieved the siege of Eshowe on 3 April and withdrew the Right Column to the British Colony of Natal. He reorganised his forces into two main thrusts. The reinforced Right Column was re-designated the 1st Division and was tasked with a steady advance along the east coast. The survivors of the Centre Column were reinforced with the cavalry brigade and other fresh troops and became the 2nd Division that would advance on Ulundi. The Left Column, which contained a high proportion of colonial irregular horse that fought as mounted infantry, was re-designated as a flying column under Colonel Evelyn Wood. This column was to operate in conjunction with the 2nd Division, supporting its advance on Ulundi.

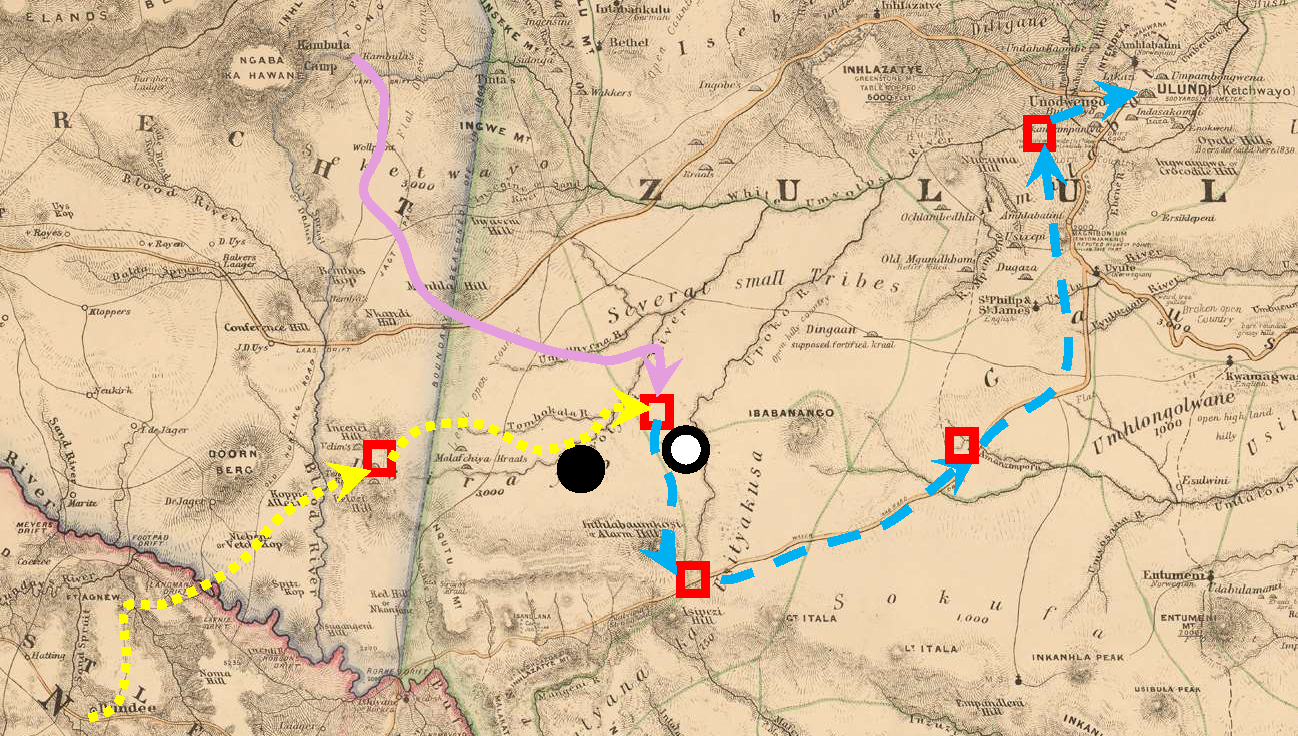
British movements during the second invasion of Zululand on a contemporary military map Second Division Wood's Flying Column Combined advance on Ulundi Site of the death of the Prince Imperial Zungeni Mountain skirmish The Nondweni River camp/Fort Newdigate is the red square immediately north of Zungeni Mountain

By the end of May, the 2nd Division commanded by Major-General Edward Newdigate had advanced from Dundee and was assembled on the banks of the Ncome River at Koppie Allein, ready to begin the invasion. Chelmsford joined the division on 31 May and commenced the advance into Zululand simultaneously with Wood further to the north. On 1 June, Napoléon, Prince Imperial of France, who had marched with the 2nd Division, was killed when the patrol he was with was overrun by Zulus. The 2nd Division and Wood's flying column made contact on 3 June but continued to camp separately; on 4 June, Wood camped at a site near the Nondweni River while the 2nd Division remained 3 miles (4.8 km) to the west.

Also on 4 June, a patrol of Baker's Horse scouting southwards from the flying column encountered a force of several hundred Zulus (Note: In English "Zulu" is a noun describing a member of the Zulu people and their language. It is also used as an adjective. The plural form can be either "Zulu" or "Zulus"; this article uses the -s plural form to distinguish it from the adjective. The sources cited use both plural forms. (Laband 2014) follows the Zulu language practice of using the ama- prefix for the plural.) at eZulaneni, a collection of four large homesteads between the Zungeni Mountain and the Ntinini stream belonging to some of Sihayo's headmen. The British also identified, at one of the homesteads, three wagons and an ammunition cart captured by the Zulu at Isandlwana. The Zulus formed a skirmish line among the dongas (dry watercourses), thorn trees and mimosa bushes and were engaged by a skirmish line of Baker's Horse. The Zulus operated in their classic "horns of the buffalo" formation and their right "horn" crossed a steep-sided donga and came within 30 yards (27 m) of the rear of the British line. A Zulu volley wounded two men before the men of Baker's Horse could withdraw to Wood's camp.

Wood passed word to Chelmsford that a significant force of Zulus were in the area, implying this was the long-expected appearance of the Zulu royal army. Chelmsford ordered the 2nd Division to laager its camp and erect earthworks in anticipation of an imminent attack. The fear of an imminent action forced the postponement of the court-martial of Lieutenant Jahleel Brenton Carey. The trial of Carey, in nominal command of the patrol in which the Prince Imperial had been killed, had been ordered by a 4 June court of inquiry headed by Marshall.

== Skirmish ==
=== Irregular horse ===
An 1884 depiction of two men of the Frontier Light Horse during the war

At dawn on 5 June, a reconnaissance force was dispatched from the flying column to eZulaneni, with orders to determine if the Zulus encountered on 4 June formed part of the royal army. This force, commanded by Lieutenant-Colonel Redvers Buller, included a squadron of Baker's Horse, a squadron of the Frontier Light Horse and a troop of the Natal Light Horse, totalling around 300 men. At 4:30 am, the 2nd Division sent out a force under Marshall's command that included two squadrons of lancers, one squadron of the King's Dragoon Guards, 130 men of Shepstone's Native Horse and 7 men from No. 3 Troop (Bettington's Horse) of the Natal Horse, totalling around 500 men. Marshall's force halted for breakfast at the camp of the flying column before following in Buller's wake.

Buller's men approached eZulaneni via the eastern flanks of Mahutshane mountain, at the same time mapping a potential wagon route for future use. It was still early morning when the British force was seen by the Zulus at eZulaneni; 300 of whom formed a skirmish line between the British and the eZulaneni homesteads. Buller formed his own line on the opposite side of the Ntinini stream; Baker's Horse formed up on his left, the Frontier Light Horse in the centre and the Natal Light Horse on his right. Buller then ordered a mounted charge against the Zulus, breaking into a gallop after they had crossed the steep-sided bed of the Ntinini. The Zulus broke formation and reformed into companies in the cover of the vegetation and dongas at the foot of Zungeni mountain, around 400 yards (370 m) east of the homesteads, from which they opened fire on the British force.

Buller led most of the Frontier Light Horse and Baker's Horse towards the Zulus as a distraction while the Natal Light Horse set fire to the homesteads. Buller's men dismounted at the edge of the vegetation and engaged the Zulus from the cover of some nearby anthills. The British found it hard to discern the Zulus in the cover and had to fire at the smoke indicating their position. Buller observed the action by using a telescope from atop an anthill and gave the order to withdraw as soon as all the homesteads were on fire. He had also become aware of the risk of being surrounded, as a party of Zulus had moved up into a mealie field on his left. The irregulars had to withdraw on foot and mount up under Zulu fire, particularly from the Zulus in the mealie field who were within 80 yards (73 m) of the British horses. At least one horse was killed and several others wounded, one of which had to be abandoned. Two men of Baker's Horse were also lightly wounded before Buller's force pulled back.

=== Regular cavalry ===
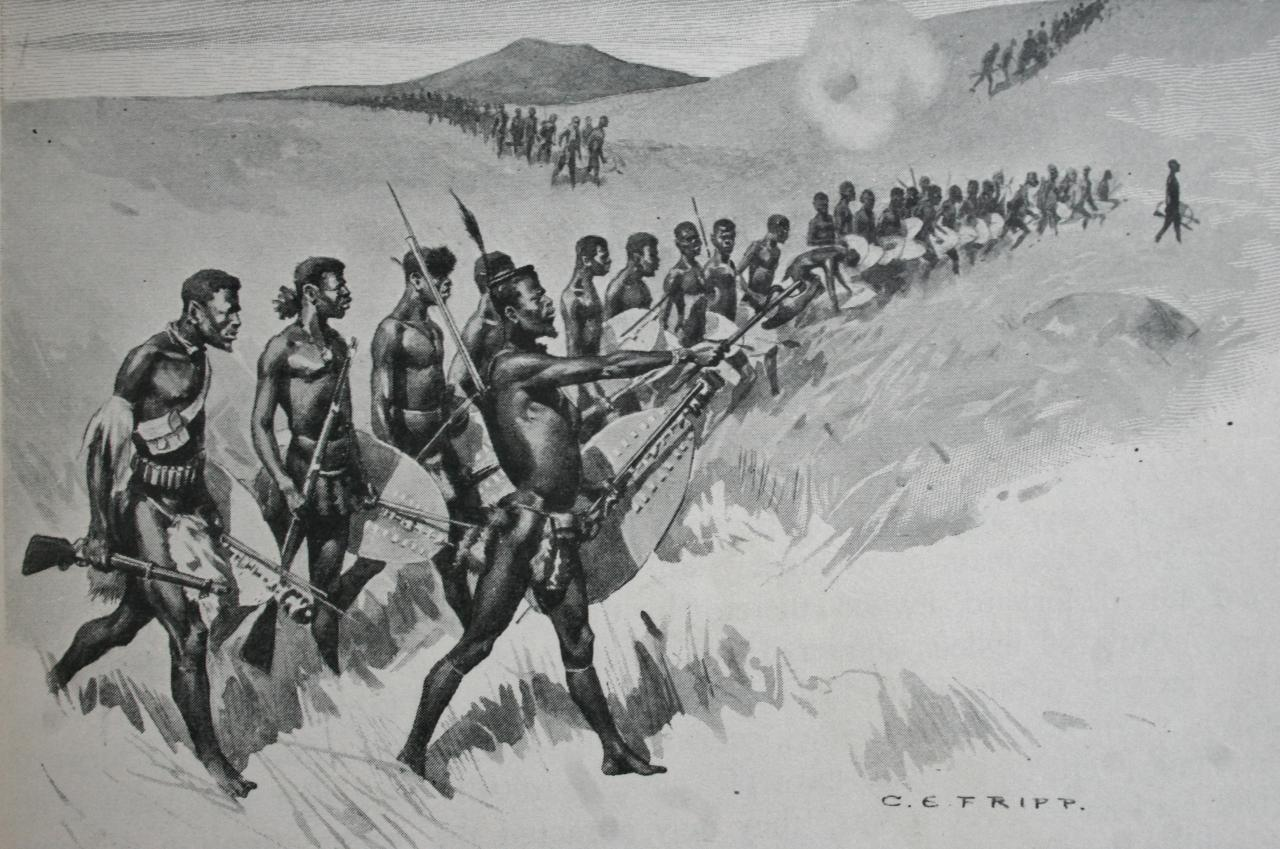
A depiction of Zulus during the war; the man at left carries a Martini-Henry rifle and wears a British ammunition belt.

After leaving the camp of the flying column, Marshall's force followed the sound of gunfire until they found Buller's men retiring from combat at a point around 2,500 yards (2,300 m) west of Zungeni Mountain (and back across the Ntinini). Marshall's regulars, who had recently arrived in Africa, were eager to see their first action and keen to avenge the death of the Prince Imperial. Two squadrons of the 17th Lancers under Colonel Drury Drury-Lowe were committed to an attack on the Zulus. The lancers approached the mountain in line formation but came under fire as they reached the burning homesteads. The cavalry passed by the Zulu position several times but were unable to engage them effectively in close combat owing to the difficult terrain.

The Zulus held their ground and shot at the passing riders. The 17th Lancer's adjutant, Lieutenant Frederick John Cokayne Frith, was struck in the heart by a shot from a range of 300 yards (270 m) and was killed. The Illustrated London News's correspondent, Melton Prior, witnessed Frith's death and noted he was killed whilst riding between Colonel Drury-Lowe and Francis Francis, correspondent of The Times. In an 1899 talk on the war, eyewitness Private Miles Gissop of the 17th Lancers recalled Frith had been shot immediately after Drury-Lowe had reassured his troops: "You are all right men. You are all right, they [the bullets] are all passing over your heads". Gissop noted that Frith stated, "Oh I'm shot", before falling dead from his horse. It was later determined that the bullet which killed Frith had been made in Britain and was fired from a Martini–Henry rifle, both having been captured by the Zulus during earlier engagements. (Note: The Zulus captured almost 1,000 Martini–Henry rifles and Swinburn–Henry carbines at Isandlwana and up to 200 at the battles of Intombe and Hlobane as well as more than 500,000 rounds of ammunition. Most of the weapons were retained by the royal army but some found their way into the hands of local, irregular forces.) General Garnet Wolseley, who replaced Chelmsford as commander of British forces in southern Africa in early July, was told that Marshall had fainted from excitement when Frith was shot.

Following Frith's death Drury-Lowe dismounted a troop within 150 yards (140 m) of the Zulu skirmishers in the vegetation and began exchanging fire to little effect. Again, Zulu forces moved to outflank the British skirmish line. Marshall spotted the difficulty the lancers were in and ordered them to retire, sending the squadron of the King's Dragoon Guards across the Ntinini to provide supporting fire from their right flank. When the Zulu fire declined, the lancers were able to withdraw with a captain and two troopers carrying Frith's body. Gissop noted that after the withdrawal, some Zulus emerged from the bushes to count the British dead, though Frith was the only one.

=== Withdrawal ===
The Zulu pursued the retiring cavalry in skirmish order, keeping up constant but ineffective fire. Some Zulus crossed the Ntinini and entered into a donga on the British flank from which they were able to fire into Buller's irregulars who had offsaddled for a rest. Although not suffering any injury, Buller's men quickly mounted and withdrew over the Mathutshane. They returned to the flying column, which had moved its camp southwards by 6 miles (9.7 km), burning a number of abandoned Zulu homesteads along the way.

The regular cavalry remained on a small plain west of the Ntini and attempted to tempt the Zulus into the open ground by hiding behind a small rise. This failed as their long lances and fluttering pennons were still visible to the Zulus. They eventually withdrew to the 2nd Division, which had advanced to the former site of the flying column's camp near the Nondweni River. The Zulus shadowed the British for several miles but did not resume combat. Frith was buried that evening in a mealie field near the Nondweni River camp; the funeral was presided over by Chaplain George Smith and attended by Chelmsford and most of the division's officers. Zulu casualties during the action are not certain but, on 3 August, a British firewood gathering party found the remains of 25 Zulus in the bushes and grass of the battlefield. Prior had sketched the moment of Frith's death during the skirmish, and an engraving based on this was published on the front page of the 2 August 1879 edition of the Illustrated London News.

== Aftermath ==
During the day of the action, Chelmsford had spoken at the Nondweni River camp with three peace envoys from Cetshwayo. The envoys were sent away in the evening with conditions Chelmsford knew would be largely unacceptable to the Zulu king. From 6 June the camp was developed into a fortified base, known as Fort Newdigate, to support the advance further into Zululand. The action at Zungeni Mountain and the death of the Prince Imperial, who had been a popular figure among the British staff officers, worried the men of the 2nd Division. On the evening of 6 June, a false alarm at Fort Newdigate led to chaos with more than 1,000 rifle shots made from the perimeter and several rounds of artillery canister shot fired. Seven British soldiers were wounded by friendly fire and several horses killed before order was restored.

Intelligence gathered during the skirmish at Zungeni proved the Zulus were not from the main army, whose men had largely returned to their homes after the victory at Isandlwana, but were local levies. Cetshwayo was still hopeful peace could be negotiated and had delayed the recall of the royal army, now around 20,000 strong, to Ulundi until June. A further raid on Zungeni was mounted on 8 June by a force of lancers, dragoons and two 7-pounder artillery pieces. This forced the Zulus to withdraw towards Ulundi and led to the burning of several more homesteads. Carey's delayed court-martial proceeded on 12 June, and he was found guilty of "misbehaviour before the enemy" and sent home. (Note: The conviction of Carey was found to be unsound by the Judge Advocate General, James Cornelius O'Dowd, in late July as the Prince had exercised effective command of the patrol, and was quashed. Carey rejoined his regiment and died of illness in India in 1883.) On 13 June Chelmsford removed Marshall from the 2nd Division, placing him in command of the lines of communication, while Drury-Lowe became the senior cavalry officer with the two columns.

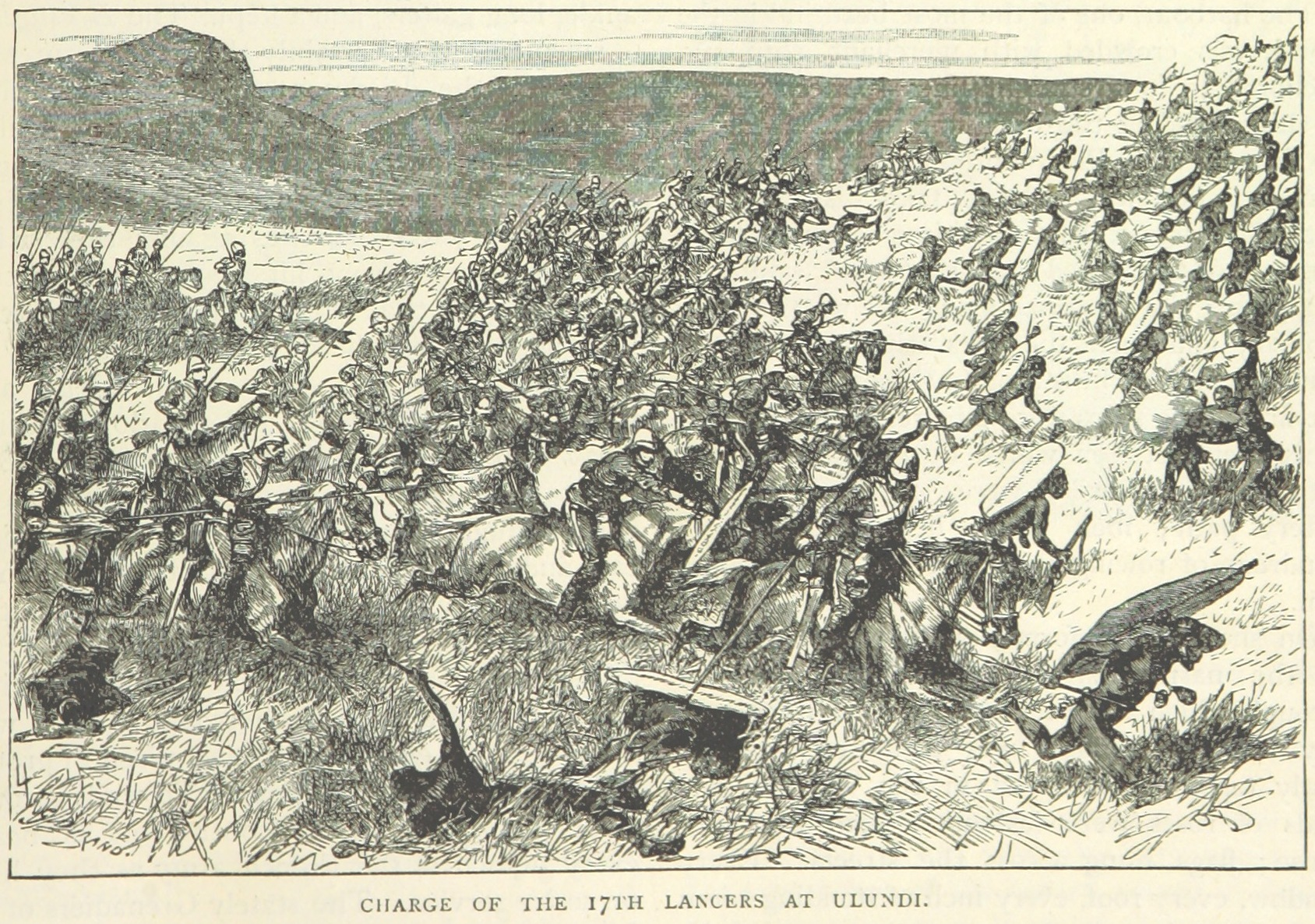
The cavalry charge at Ulundi

The 2nd Division and Wood's flying column continued their march into Zululand on 18 June, patrolling regularly to drive off Zulu forces and establishing several more fortified camps. The Zulu were finally defeated at the 4 July Battle of Ulundi, where a British square stood firm against repeated assaults. When the Zulus began to falter, Chelmsford ordered Drury-Lowe to lead five troops of lancers and one of sword-armed dragoon guards out of the square. On an open plain against a spent enemy, they proved particularly effective, sweeping the battlefield clear to a distance of 3 miles (4.8 km) and killing 150 Zulus. Drury-Lowe considered the action demonstrated the superiority of the lance over the sword in pursuit conditions.

After Ulundi, many of the mounted troops were returned to Natal, though some were kept on for some months to enforce the dismantling of the Zulu kingdom. The iButho was abolished; Cetshwayo was deposed and his possessions seized. The kingdom was split into 13 chiefdoms under rulers loyal to the British and under the overall supervision of a British resident administrator. The measures ultimately led to the 1883–1884 Third Zulu Civil War and the annexation of Zululand to Natal in 1897.

== Analysis ==
British historian Ian Knight regards the skirmish as an example of the expanded role played in the war by irregular, locally directed Zulu forces after Isandlwana. South African historian John Laband notes that the irregular forces were the only Zulus offering any real resistance to the second invasion. However, by the early 20th century the irregulars were derided by veterans of the royal army for fighting "in forests and fastnesses" rather than taking "up a position in the open and [coming] face to face with the foe".

Laband notes the tactics exhibited by the Zulus at Zungeni Mountain resembled those of the most successful Zulu irregular forces, those operating in the north-west of Zululand. These forces, whose leaders included the renegade Swazi prince Mbilini waMswati, inflicted defeats on the British at the Battle of Intombe on 12 March and the Battle of Hlobane on 28 March. The Kubheka people of the region, operating as guerrillas from their cave homesteads, became the last Zulu forces to resist the British, not surrendering until 8 September.

Laband regards the unknown Zulu commander during the skirmish at Zungeni to have displayed excellent tactical command skills and the ability to innovate, which he considers was lacking in the elderly commanders of the Zulu royal army who defaulted to assaults on fortified positions. Laband notes that at Zungeni, the Zulus mitigated the British technological advantage by good use of cover and terrain and the employment of enfilading fire. This was particularly effective when Zulu marksmen, such as those with pre-war experience of work with hunting parties, were employed with modern weapons such as captured Martini-Henry rifles.

Laband notes the skirmish at Zungeni Mountain showed the limitations of the use of regular cavalry armed with melee weapons against the Zulu. The lancers' large horses were also ill-suited to the terrain of Zululand when compared with the cobs and ponies preferred by the irregulars. The lancers performed well in the latter stages of the Battle of Ulundi when they rode down withdrawing Zulu forces on an open plain, but they were not the right choice for engaging a fresh force of firearm-wielding skirmishers in rough ground. Laband regards the order by Marshall for the lancers to engage at Zungeni as a mistake, given the objective of burning eZulaneni had already been achieved.

The lancers were armed with carbines and trained to use them dismounted, in a similar manner as Buller's irregulars, but considered it an inferior form of combat used by lesser mounted troops. The lancers had only arrived in Southern Africa in April 1879 and reached Natal in May. They had had little chance to adapt to local conditions and Zulu tactics. A Times of Natal correspondent and eyewitness to the skirmish compared the tactics of the lancers unfavourably with that of the irregulars, though he commended their gallantry and discipline. Engagements such as the action at Zungeni Mountain, together with the skirmish that resulted in the death of the Prince Imperial, were successful in locally and temporarily disrupting the activities of the British and causing embarrassment to Chelmsford, but ultimately had no effect on the outcome of the war.

== Bibliography ==
- Castle, Ian (2003). Zulu War: Volunteers, Irregulars & Auxiliaries. Oxford, England: Osprey. ISBN 978-1-84-176484-9.
- Clammer, David (1980). "The Recollections of Miles Gissop: With the 17th Lancers in Zululand". Journal of the Society for Army Historical Research. 58 (234): 78–92. ISSN 0037-9700. JSTOR 44223296.
- David, Saul (2004). Zulu: The Heroism and Tragedy of the Zulu War of 1879. London: Viking. ISBN 0-670-91474-6.
- Greaves, Adrian (2005). Crossing the Buffalo: The Zulu War of 1879. London: Cassell. ISBN 978-0-3043-6725-2.
- Greaves, Adrian (2002). Rorke's Drift. London: Cassell. ISBN 0-304-36641-2.
- Greaves, Adrian; Mkhize, Xolani (2014). The Zulus at War: The History, Rise, and Fall of the Tribe That Washed Its Spears. New York: Skyhorse. ISBN 978-1-62914-513-6.
- Knight, Ian (1991). British Forces in Zululand 1879. Oxford: Osprey. ISBN 978-1-85532-109-0.
- Knight, Ian; Castle, Ian (2003). Zulu War 1879: Twilight of a Warrior Nation. Oxford: Osprey. ISBN 1-85532-165-3.
- Knight, Ian (2004). The National Army Museum Book of the Zulu War. London: Pan Books. ISBN 033-0-48629-2.
- Knight, Ian (2008). Companion to the Anglo-Zulu War. Barnsley: Pen and Sword. ISBN 978-1-84415-801-0.
- Knight, Ian (2015). The Anatomy of the Zulu Army: From Shaka to Cetshwayo, 1818–1879. Barnsley: Frontline Books. pp. 33–35. ISBN 978-1-84832-911-9.
- Laband, John (September 1993). "'Chopping Wood with a Razor': the Skirmish at eZungeni Mountain and the Unnecessary Death of Lieutenant Frith, 5 June 1879". Soldiers of the Queen (74): 5–9. OCLC 1015438363.
- Laband, John (2009a). Historical Dictionary of the Zulu Wars. Lanham, Maryland: Scarecrow Press. ISBN 978-0-8108-6300-2.
- Laband, John (December 2009b). "The War-Readiness and Military Effectiveness of the Zulu Forces in the 1879 Anglo-Zulu War" (PDF). Natalia (39): 37–46. Archived (PDF) from the original on 23 August 2025.
- Laband, John (2014). Zulu Warriors: The Battle for the South African Frontier. New Haven, Connecticut: Yale University Press. ISBN 978-0-300-20619-7.
- Laband, John (2023). In the Shadow of Isandlwana: The Life and Times of General Lord Chelmsford and his Disaster in Zululand. Barnsley: Greenhill Books. ISBN 978-1-78438-771-6.
- Marten, Lutz; Hurst-Harosh, Ellen; Kula, Nancy C.; Zeller, Jochen (2025). The Oxford Guide to the Bantu Languages. Oxford: Oxford University Press. ISBN 978-0-19-253592-4.
- Paulin, Christopher M. (2001). White Men's Dreams, Black Men's Blood: African Labor and British Expansionism in Southern Africa, 1877–1895. Trenton, New Jersey: Africa World Press. ISBN 978-0-86543-929-0.
- Rothwell, Captain J. S. (1989) [1881]. Narrative of the Field Operations Connected with the Zulu War of 1879. London: Greenhill Books. ISBN 1-85367-041-3. OL 8980321M – via Quartermaster General's Department, Intelligence Branch, War Office.
- Smith, Keith (2014). Dead Was Everything: Studies in the Anglo-Zulu War. Barnsley: Frontline Books. ISBN 978-1-4738-3723-2.
- Sutherland, Jonathan; Canwell, Diane (2004). Zulu Kings and their Armies. Barnsley: Pen and Sword. ISBN 978-1-84415-060-1.
