= Baker's Horse =

British irregular military unit

- Active: 1878; February-August 1879
- Country: Cape Colony
- Allegiance: British Empire
- Branch: British Colonial Auxiliary Forces
- Type: Mounted infantry
- Size: c. 100 men
- Engagements: Ninth Cape Frontier War; Anglo-Zulu War; Battle of Hlobane; Battle of Kambula; Zungeni Mountain skirmish; Battle of Ulundi

Commanders
- Commander: Francis James Baker

Baker's Horse was an irregular mounted infantry unit in British service in Southern Africa during the Ninth Cape Frontier War (1878) and the Anglo-Zulu War (1879). It was first established by ex-British Army officer Francis James Baker in East London, Cape Colony and disbanded in December 1878. The following month British forces suffered a defeat in the Battle of Isandlwana and Baker offered to reform the unit. His first batch of men were mustered within weeks and they joined the British column at Kambula on 22 March.

Baker's Horse fought in the Battle of Hlobane, where they suffered their only fatalities when eight men were killed in action during the British defeat. They also fought in the Battle of Kambula, the Zungeni Mountain skirmish and the Battle of Ulundi as well as a number of scouting actions. After British victory in the war the unit was disbanded in August 1879.

== Ninth Cape Frontier War ==
Baker's Horse was established by ex-British Army officer Francis James Baker in 1878. Baker had served in the Ceylon Rifle Regiment from 1860 and, after his return to Britain, in the Royal Anglesey Militia from 1873. (Note: Baker was commissioned as an ensign in the Ceylon Rifle Regiment on 18 December 1860, he was promoted to lieutenant on 13 June 1868 and reached the rank of captain. He was appointed a captain in the Royal Anglesey Militia on 2 July 1873 and resigned his commission on 25 April 1877.) He arrived in the Cape Colony, Southern Africa, in 1877. Baker soon established Baker's Horse, an irregular mounted infantry unit, at East London for service in the Ninth Cape Frontier War. He marched the unit to Natal Colony before returning to East London to disband in December 1878.

== Anglo-Zulu War ==
=== Formation ===
Upon hearing of the 22 January 1879 British defeat in the Battle of Isandlwana during the Anglo-Zulu War Baker made an offer to British commander Frederic Thesiger, 2nd Baron Chelmsford to re-raise the unit. Chelmsford agreed and Baker had soon mustered 50 volunteers, who set sail from East London for Durban on 7 February. Further batches of men departed on 21 and 24 February.

A depiction of the Frontier Light Horse during the war, Baker's Horse were likely similarly equipped

The men were issued uniforms by Baker in East London, which were likely similar to those issued to the Frontier Light Horse: a yellow/brown corduroy tunic and trousers with a slouch hat with a red hat band. One recorded instance of the unit being nicknamed the "canaries" might reflect this uniform. Baker's Horse marched on foot from Durban to Pietermaritzburg to receive their arms (Note: British irregulars during the war carried a mix of breech-loading carbines including the Martini–Henry, the Swinburn–Henry and Snider–Enfield.) and equipment and on to the frontier town of Estcourt to be issued with horses. At Estcourt the unit received training from Captain W. Whalley and Lieutenant W. Tomasson of the Frontier Light Horse.

Baker's Horse travelled from Estcourt via Utrecht in the nearby Boer republic of the Transvaal to the base of the British Left Column, under Colonel Evelyn Wood, at Kambula. On arrival with Wood's column on 22 March they numbered 105 men. Baker was accorded the rank of commandant, a rank not used in the British Army and broadly equivalent to major.

=== Actions ===
Soon after their arrival, on 28 March, a squadron of 57 men commanded by Lieutenant Wilson took part in the Battle of Hlobane and lost eight men killed and one wounded in the British defeat. The following day 99 men of the unit, brigaded together with other irregulars under the command of Lieutenant-Colonel Redvers Buller, fought in defence of the British camp in the Battle of Kambula. One man was wounded in the successful British action.

Baker's Horse was assigned to Wood's Flying Column during the second British invasion of Zululand. On 15 May a part of the unit accompanied Louis-Napoléon, Prince Imperial on a scouting trip near Nquthu during which the prince rode off recklessly from his escort. Similar actions on 1 June while Louis-Napoléon was in the field with another unit led to his death in a Zulu ambush. On 4 June a patrol of Baker's Horse engaged several hundred Zulus near Zungeni Mountain and two men of the unit were wounded. The following day a squadron accompanied other British irregular horse back to the mountain where they fought the Zungeni Mountain skirmish against around 300 Zulus. British forces successfully burnt Zulu homesteads but were unable to inflict heavy casualties; two men of Baker's Horse were lightly wounded.

Two squadrons were engaged in the 3 July White Mfolozi reconnaissance in force towards the Zulu capital of Ulundi, as part of a group of around 500 mounted irregulars under Buller. Baker led around 100 of his men across the White Mfolozi river near to the British camp. The crossing was defended by rifle-armed Zulus but they were taken by surprise by the rapid advance of Baker's men and fled. Baker killed one Zulu and his men accounted for five others, including one captured and shot in the act of escaping. Buller, crossing separately with the rest of the force, was led into a Zulu ambush that they only narrowly escaped with minor losses. Baker's men gave covering fire and held their crossing point against the Zulu until Buller's men could cross. Baker's Horse suffered no casualties in the action but three of Buller's men were killed and four wounded.

The following day 6 officers and 86 men, under the command of Baker, fought at the Battle of Ulundi, the deciding battle of the war and a significant British victory; one man was wounded. Baker entered the Zulu capital, kicked in the door of King Cetshwayo's home and looted one of the three elephant tusks found there. Ulundi marked the British victory in the war, Baker's Horse returned to the Cape Colony in early August and was disbanded.

A total of 224 men served with the unit during the war. The unit was one of three irregular mounted units (Note: More than 20 irregular horse units served in the Anglo-Zulu War.) mentioned as performing particularly well in the war by historian Ian Castle, writing in 2003. The other two being the Frontier Light Horse and a unit of German troops led by Frederick Schermbrucker, known variously as the Kaffrarian Rifles or the Vanguard.

== Bibliography ==
- Castle, Ian (2003). Zulu War: Volunteers, Irregulars & Auxiliaries. Oxford: Osprey Publishing. ISBN 9781841764849.
- David, Saul (2004). Zulu: The Heroism and Tragedy of the Zulu War of 1879. London: Viking. ISBN 0-670-91474-6.
- Greaves, Adrian (2012). Forgotten Battles of the Zulu War. Barnsley, South Yorkshire: Pen & Sword. ISBN 978-1-84884-746-0.
- Knight, Ian (1991). British Forces in Zululand 1879. Oxford: Osprey. ISBN 978-1-85532-109-0.
- Laband, John (September 1993). "'Chopping Wood with a Razor': the Skirmish at eZungeni Mountain and the Unnecessary Death of Lieutenant Frith, 5 June 1879". Soldiers of the Queen (74): 5–9. OCLC 1015438363.
- Laband, John (2009). Historical Dictionary of the Zulu Wars. Lanham, Maryland: Scarecrow Press. ISBN 978-0-8108-6300-2.
- Morris, Donald R. (1965). The Washing of the Spears. Pen and Sword. ISBN 067-1-63108-X.
- Rothwell, Captain J.S. (1989) [1881]. Narrative of the Field Operations Connected with the Zulu War of 1879. London: Greenhill Books. ISBN 1-85367-041-3. OL 8980321M – via Quartermaster General's Department, Intelligence Branch, War Office.
