= Frederick John Cokayne Frith =

British Army officer (1858–1879)

Lieutenant Frederick John Cokayne Frith (22 September 1858 – 5 June 1879) was a Scottish officer in the British Army. He served as adjutant to Colonel Drury Drury-Lowe of the 17th Lancers cavalry regiment during the Anglo-Zulu War. He was killed by a Zulu sniper during the Zungeni Mountain skirmish, leading to the British withdrawing from the engagement.

== Biography ==
=== Education and training ===
Frederick John Cokayne Frith was born on 22 September 1858 in Oban, Argyllshire, Scotland to Major Cokayne Frith and Amelia Kane. He attended school in Dunchurch, Warwickshire and then went to Haileybury College where in 1875 he underwent an army examination under John Le Fleming. He passed twelfth of the list of candidates and joined the Royal Military College, Sandhurst as a sub-lieutenant. He was listed as an unattached sub-lieutenant by Hart's New Army List on 12 February 1876. Four days later, on 16 February 1876, he was sent to the 17th Lancers. He had a previous commission for the Argyll and Bute Artillery Militia, but never joined due to passing his examination at Sandhurst. Frith obtained his first-class certificate in 1878, from the School of Musketry in Hythe, and was appointed on 12 February 1879 adjutant of his regiment.

=== Anglo-Zulu War ===
"The Death of Lieutenant Frith, Anglo-Zulu War." Engraved from a sketch by Melton Prior, published in the Illustrated London News 2 August 1879

On 5 June 1879, irregulars of the 2nd Division and Wood's Flying Column unsuccessfully skirmished with about three-hundred Zulu irregulars at Zungeni Mountain and burnt four homesteads before withdrawing due to the threat of the Zulu surrounding them. The 17th Lancers, as regular cavalry, were sent to the action following the withdrawal of the irregulars. The cavalry was led by Colonel Drury Drury-Lowe, but the terrain was unsuited to their tactics. The cavalry were unable to engage with the Zulus, who hid in the long grass and took shots at them as they passed.

Half of the men of the 17th dismounted to return fire, but Frith remained mounted. According to Private Miles Gissop, Drury-Lowe claimed "You are all right men. You are all right, they are aiming over your heads" only a moment before a bullet struck Frith in the heart. According to Gissop, Frith exclaimed "Oh I'm shot" and fell dead from his horse, with one man on either side supporting his body and leading the horse away. The Illustrated London News war correspondent Melton Prior reported that Frith was shot while riding between Colonel Drury-Lowe (to his right) and a Times correspondent Mr. Francis (to his left). The bullet that killed him was of a British make and fired from a Martini-Henry Rifle captured by the Zulus from British troops in an earlier engagement.

A funeral was held for Frith at Camp Newdigate, and he was buried in a mealie field. Other officers attended the funeral, including Lieut. General Frederic Thesiger, 2nd Baron Chelmsford and Edward Newdegate. His was the only death on the British side in the skirmish, though a sergeant of the engineers was shot the following day and died of his wounds.

== See also ==
- Cavalry regiments of the British Army
