= Transvaal Rangers =

Irregular cavalry unit

Raaffs Horse, or Raaff's Transvaal Rangers, was an irregular unit raised by Cmdt Pieter Johannes Edward Raaff with a strength of approximately 140. The Transvaal Rangers enlisted both European and Coloured personnel in its ranks, and recruited large numbers from the Kimberley diamond fields. It served in the 4 July 1879 Battle of Ulundi - the final battle of the Anglo-Zulu War as well as the earlier battles of Hlobane and Kambula.
