= Melton Prior =

British illustrator and war correspondent

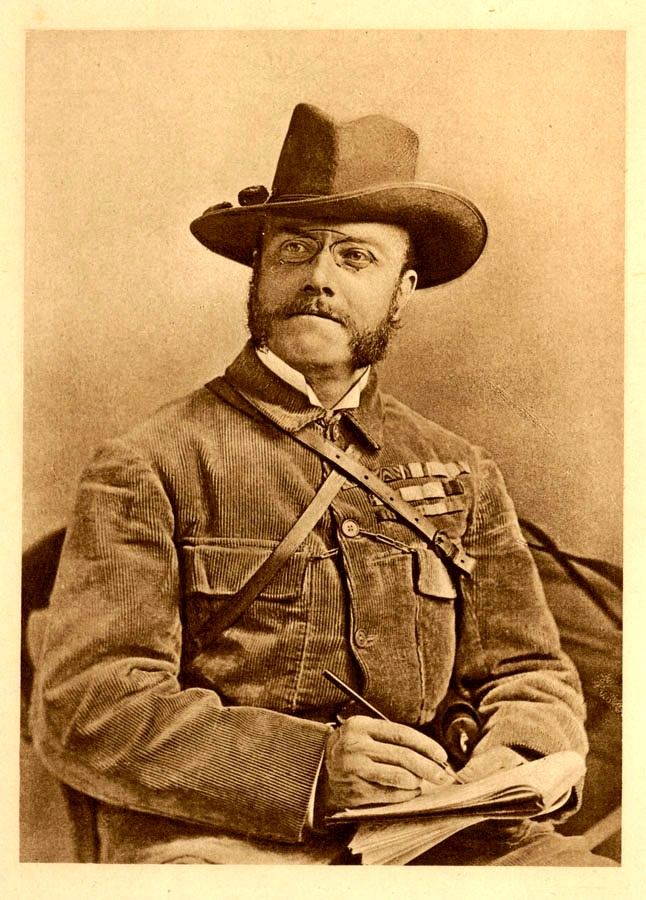
- Born: 12 September 1845; Camden Town, London, England
- Died: 2 November 1910 (aged 65); London, England
- Occupations: Illustrator, war correspondent
- Years active: 1873–1905

Melton Prior (12 September 1845 – 2 November 1910), was an English artist and war correspondent for The Illustrated London News from the early 1870s until 1904. Prior was one of the leading illustrators of late Victorian Britain, noted for his ability to quickly sketch scenes. His pencil sketches were sent back to London where they were re-drawn by studio artists and engraved on wood-blocks for printing in the Saturday issues of the Illustrated London News. In addition to covering conflicts around the world, he also traveled on a number of Royal tours including accompanying the Prince of Wales to Canada in 1901.

Prior was one of two major artists employed by the Illustrated London News, with the other being William Simpson (1823–1899).

== Life ==
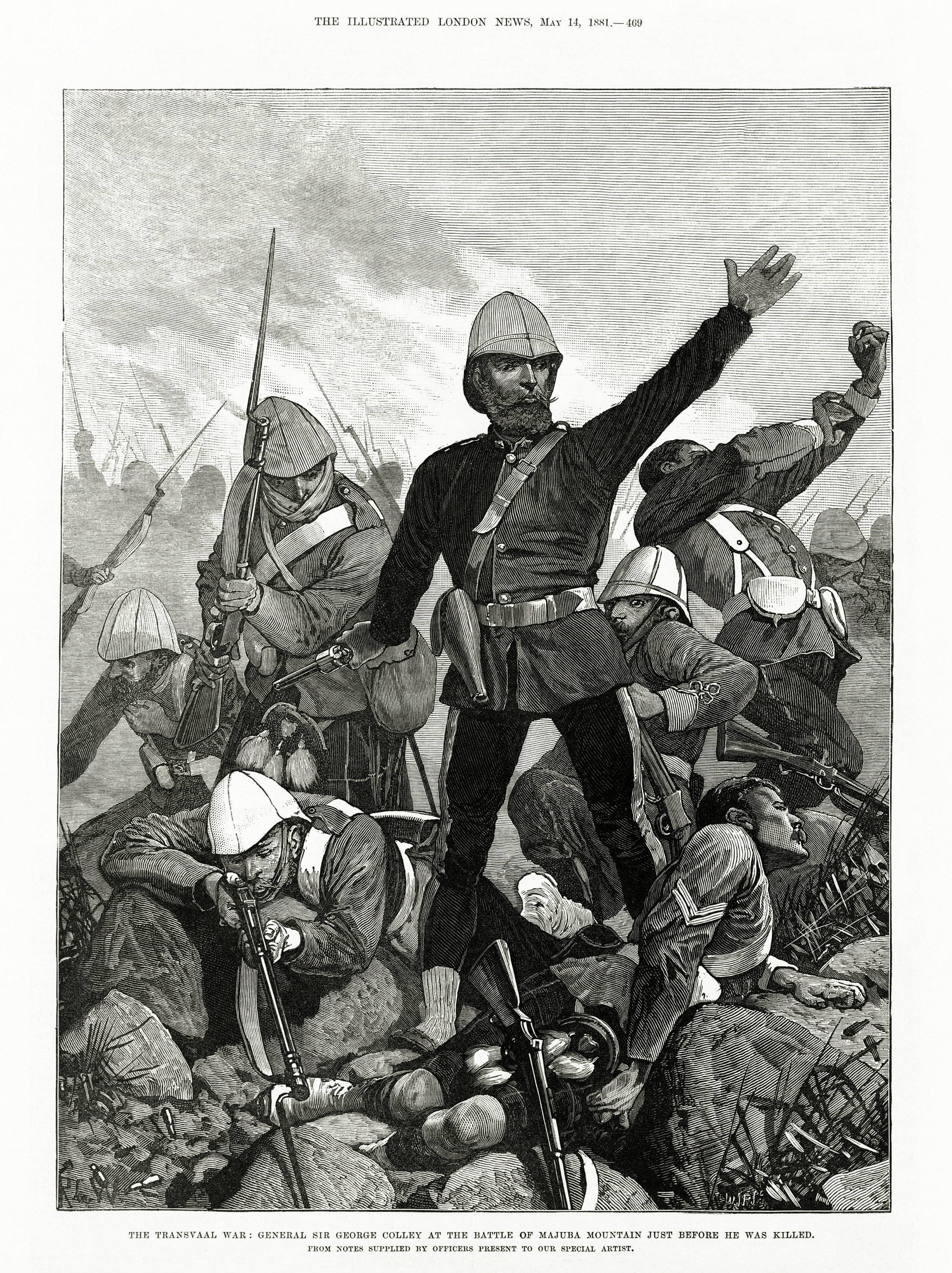
Illustration of the Battle of Majuba Hill for the Illustrated London News (1881)

Prior was born in Camden Town, London, and studied under his father, William Henry Prior (1812–1882), a landscape artist, painter and illustrator. In 1873, he was contracted by the Illustrated London News to travel to West Africa to cover the Ashanti War. Among the correspondents that Prior rubbed along with in West Africa was G. A. Henty, with whom he had shared a hut on the campaign. Prior produced a drawing of the quarters that the war-correspondents shared and this was a title page illustration for the Illustrated London News on 28 February 1874. This was followed by covering the fighting against the Carlists in Spain before heading to eastern Europe where Prior sketched the events in Herzegovina and the Russo-Turkish War.

=== South Africa, 1879–1881 ===
In 1879, Prior traveled to Durban to report on the Zulu War which had just broken out. While he missed the events at Isandlwana and Rorke's Drift, he did witness subsequent actions including the final Battle of Ulundi He was also with the group who discovered the body of the Prince Imperial. Although Boer farmers had assisted the British in the war against the Zulus, they resented the encroachment by English farmers and industrialists on their lands, and sought the independence of the Transvaal and Orange Free State. Following the breakdown of negotiations, hostilities broke out, and Prior witnessed the aftermath of the British disaster at Majuba Hill.

=== North Africa, 1882–1885 ===
The following year, Prior found himself offshore on a Royal Navy ship during the bombardment of Alexandria. Later, he accompanied the British forces under General Sir Garnet Wolseley on the expedition down the Nile which culminated with the destruction of the Egyptian Army at Tel-el-Kebir on 13 September 1882. In 1884–85, he accompanied the relief expedition for General Charles Gordon and was present at the Battle of Abu Klea in the Sudan.

=== South Africa, 1896–1902 ===
Following the events in Sudan, Prior was sent to the Far East to cover the operations in Burma. The mid-1890s found him back in South Africa, covering the failed Jameson Raid, the Matabele uprising and the subsequent Boer War, although he also covered the campaign in the Tirah on the North-West Frontier of British India in 1897. During the fighting against the Boers, Prior found himself besieged at Ladysmith.

=== Final years ===
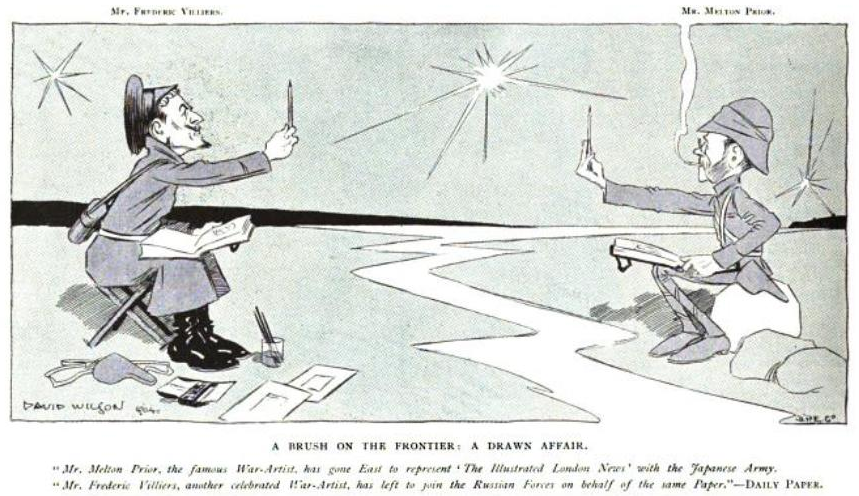
Cartoon by David Wilson depicting Frederic Villiers and Prior covering opposing sides of the Russo-Japanese War for the Illustrated London News

Prior's last campaigns were the Somaliland Expedition of 1903, and the Russo-Japanese War of 1904–1905. He died in London on 2 November 1910. He was buried at Hither Green Cemetery. A monument to Prior with a bas-relief portrait exists within the crypt at St Paul's Cathedral, London.

== Works by ==
- Prior, Melton. (1912). Campaigns of a War Correspondent. London: Edward Arnold.
