= Battle of Ulundi =

1879 battle of the Anglo-Zulu War

- Part of the Anglo-Zulu War
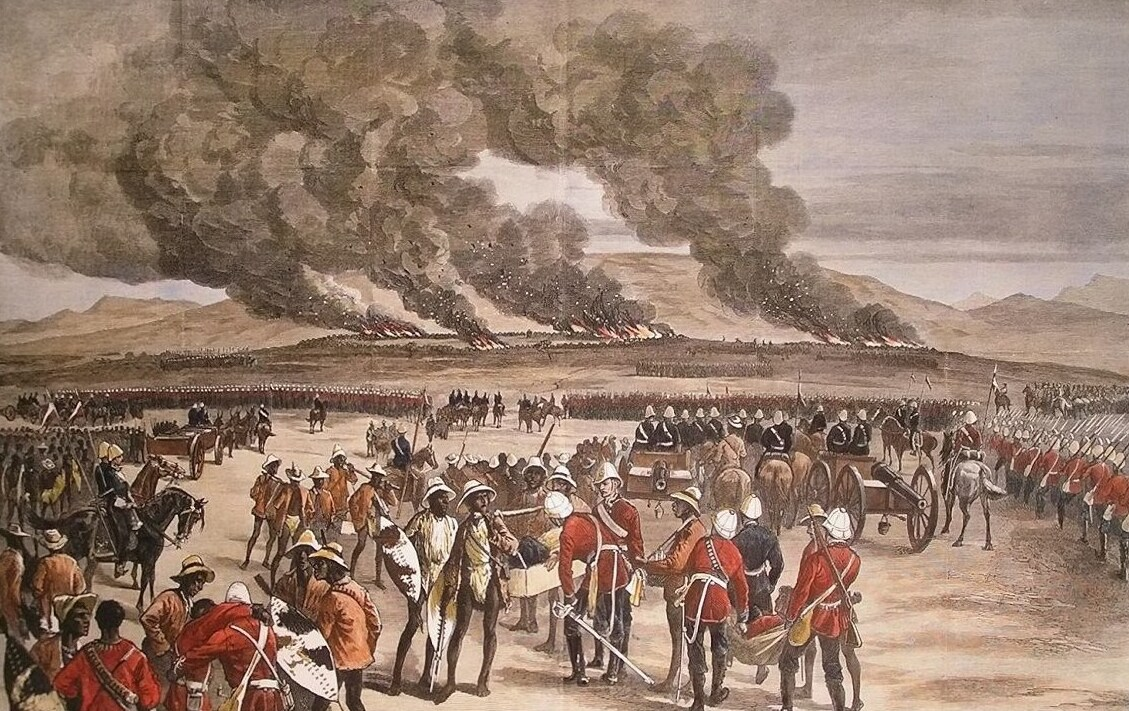
- "The Burning of Ulundi"
| Date | 4 July 1879 |
| Location | Ulundi, South Africa 28°18′40″S 31°25′35″E |
| Result | British victory |

Belligerents
| United Kingdom | Zulu Kingdom |

Commanders and leaders
| (United Kingdom of Great Britain and Ireland) Lord Chelmsford | Ziwedu kaMpande |

Strength
| 4,200 British (Note: Chisholm, Hugh, ed. (1911). "Zululand". Encyclopædia Britannica (11th ed.). Cambridge University Press. gives 5,200); 1,000 Africans; 2 Gatling guns; 10 field guns | 12,000–15,000 (Note: Chisholm, Hugh, ed. (1911). "Zululand". Encyclopædia Britannica (11th ed.). Cambridge University Press. gives 12,000 to 15,000) |

Casualties and losses
| 13–18 killed; 69–89 wounded (Note: Knight gives 13 killed 69 wounded.Knight 2005, p. 59 gives 18 killed, 85 wounded.Colenso & Durnford 1880, p. 448) | 473 killed (Note: Hall quotes the London Standard reporting 473 counted dead.Hall 1978); 1,000+ wounded (Note: The report states 1,500 Zulu casualties."The Battle of Ulundi". The New York Times. 25 July 1879. Chisholm, Hugh, ed. (1911). "Zululand". Encyclopædia Britannica (11th ed.). Cambridge University Press. gives 1,500 casualties) |

The Battle of Ulundi (also known as the Battle of kwaNodwengu or the Battle of oCwecweni) took place at the Zulu capital of Ulundi (Zulu: oNdini) on 4 July 1879 and was the last battle of the Anglo-Zulu War. The British Army broke the military power of the Zulu Kingdom by defeating the main Zulu army and capturing and burning the royal kraal of oNdini.

== Prelude ==
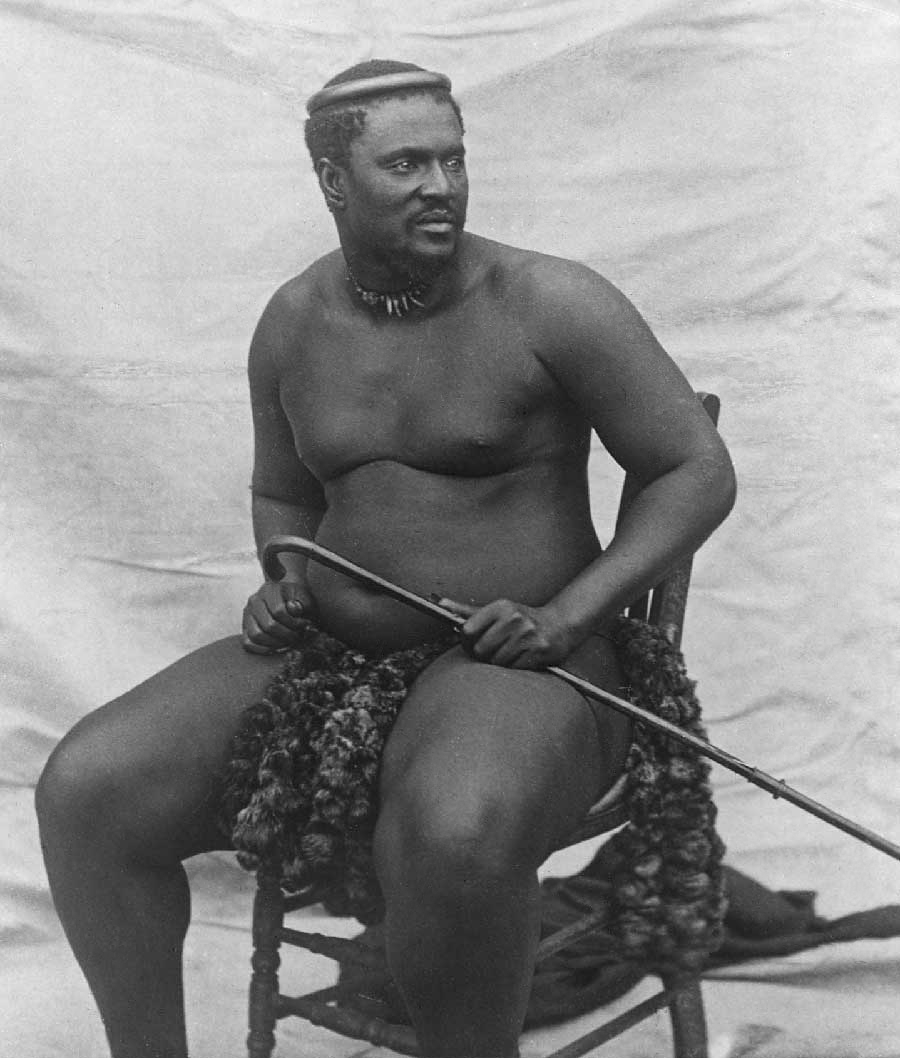
Photograph of Prince Ndabuko kaMpande

After the Zulu victory at the battle of Isandlwana in January over Lord Chelmsford's main column and the failure of the first invasion of Zululand, the British launched a new invasion. In April 1879, despite the Battle of Kambula and the Battle of Gingindlovu, that had been costly defeats for the Zulus, the British were back at their starting point. News of the defeat at Isandlwana had hit Britain hard and a flood of reinforcements had arrived in Natal, with which Chelmsford prepared a second invasion of Zululand. Chelmsford was aware by mid-June that Sir Garnet Wolseley had superseded his command of the British forces. Chelmsford was ordered by Her Majesty's Government to "... submit and subordinate your plans to his control". Chelmsford ignored this and various peace offers from Cetshwayo to strike while the Zulu were recovering from their defeats and to attempt to regain his reputation before Wolseley could remove him from command of the army.

... everyone understood that he would try and end the war before he was superseded ... that 'poor Lord Chelmsford' might get a chance, win a battle ...

Cetshwayo's translator, Cornelius Vijn, a Dutch trader he had imprisoned at the start of the war, informed Chelmsford through the peace offers of gathering Zulu forces.

For his renewed offensive Chelmsford's strength was increased to 25,000. (Note: Colenso) The very size of the force overwhelmed the supply and transport capacity of Natal and Chelmsford would have to use a number of troops that could be sustained in the field. For his main column, he fielded two cavalry regiments, five batteries of artillery and 12 infantry battalions, amounting to 1,000 regular cavalry, 9,000 regular infantry and a further 7,000 men with 24 guns, including the first British Army Gatling gun battery. The supply train consisted of 600 wagons, 8,000 oxen and 1,000 mules. The structure of the force was reorganised; No. 4 column (Colonel Evelyn Wood) became the flying column, Colonel Charles Pearson was relieved of command by Major General Henry Crealock and his No.1 column became the 1st Division and Major General Newdigate was given command of the new 2nd Division, accompanied by Chelmsford.

== Invasion ==
All through April and May there was much manoeuvring by the British, particularly with supply and transport. On 3 June, the main thrust of the second invasion began its slow advance on Ulundi. The correspondent of The Times wrote, "We are wandering towards Ulundi much as the Children of Israel wandered towards Canaan ... ". The 1st Division was to advance along the coast, supporting the 2nd Division, which with Wood's flying column, an independent unit, was to march on Ulundi from Rorke's Drift and Kambula. With his army damaged after Kambula, King Cetshwayo refrained from attacking the extended and vulnerable supply convoys and the British advance was unopposed.

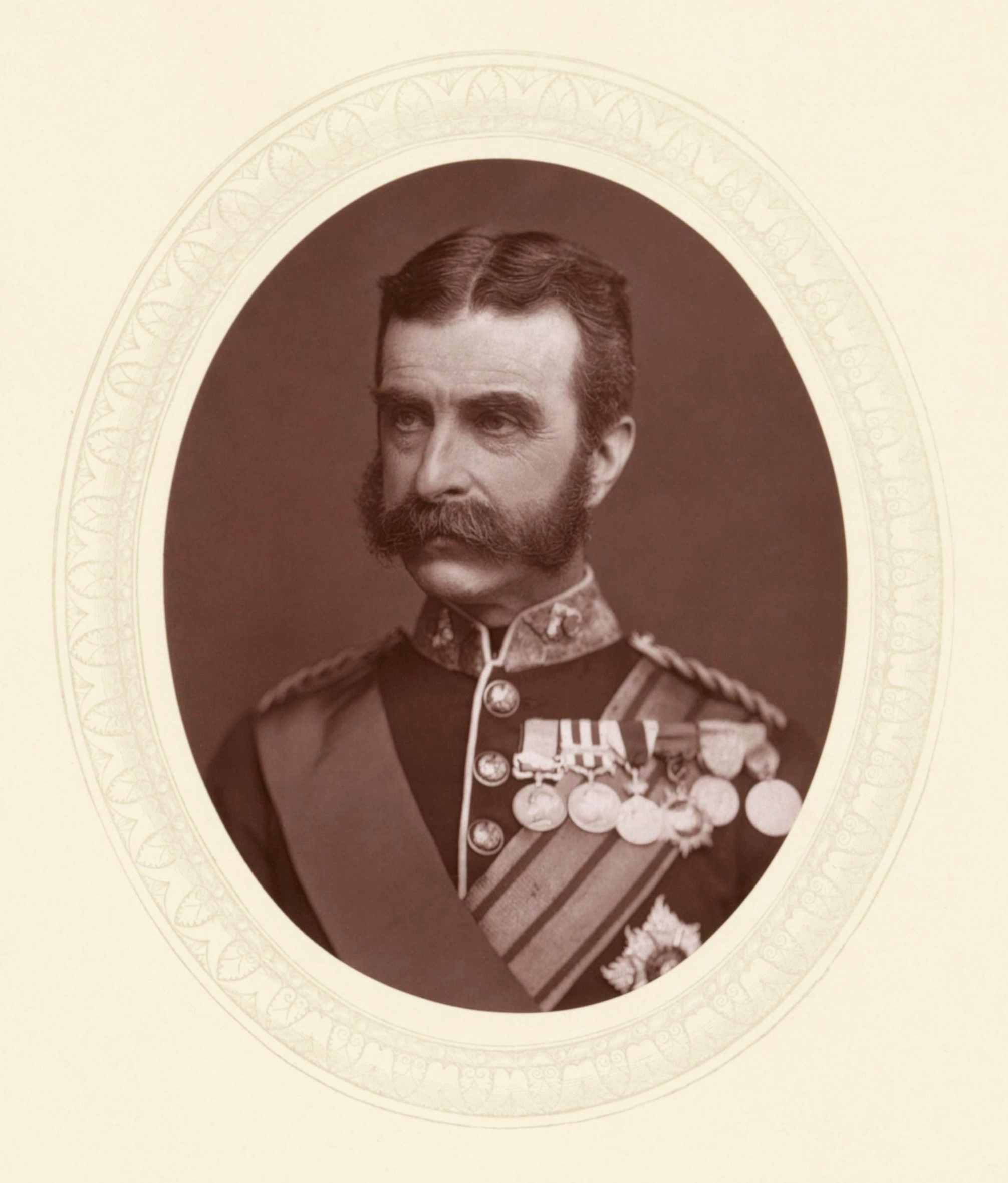
Lord Chelmsford

On the evening of 6 June, jittery British troops and artillery in laager at Fort Newdigate, opened fire on an arriving piquet company of Royal Engineers commanded by Lieutenant John Chard of Rorke's Drift fame, killing two horses and wounding one. By 16 June the slow advance was quickened by the news that Wolseley was on his way to Natal to take command. It " ... acted as the "spur to the head" which expedited Lord Chelmsford's movements." On 17 June a depot named 'Fort Marshall' was established – not far from Isandlhwana. On 28 June Chelmsford's column was 17 mi (27 km) away from Ulundi and had established the supply depots of 'Fort Newdigate', 'Fort Napoleon' and 'Port Durnford' when Sir Garnet Wolseley arrived in Cape Town. Wolseley had cabled Chelmsford ordering him not to undertake any serious actions on 23 June but the message was only received through a galloper on this day. Chelmsford had no intention of letting Wolseley stop him from making a last effort to restore his reputation and did not reply. A second message was sent on 30 June reading:

Concentrate your force immediately and keep it concentrated. Undertake no serious operations with detached bodies of troops. Acknowledge receipt of this message at once and flash back your latest moves. I am astonished at not hearing from you.

Wolseley, straining to assert command over Chelmsford, tried to join the 1st Division, lagging along the coast behind the main advance. A final message was sent to Chelmsford explaining that he would be joining the 1st Division and that their location was where Chelmsford should retreat if he was compelled. High seas prevented Wolseley landing at Port Durnford and he had to take the road. As Wolseley rode north from Durban, Chelmsford was preparing for battle. Wolseley's efforts to reach the front had been in vain.

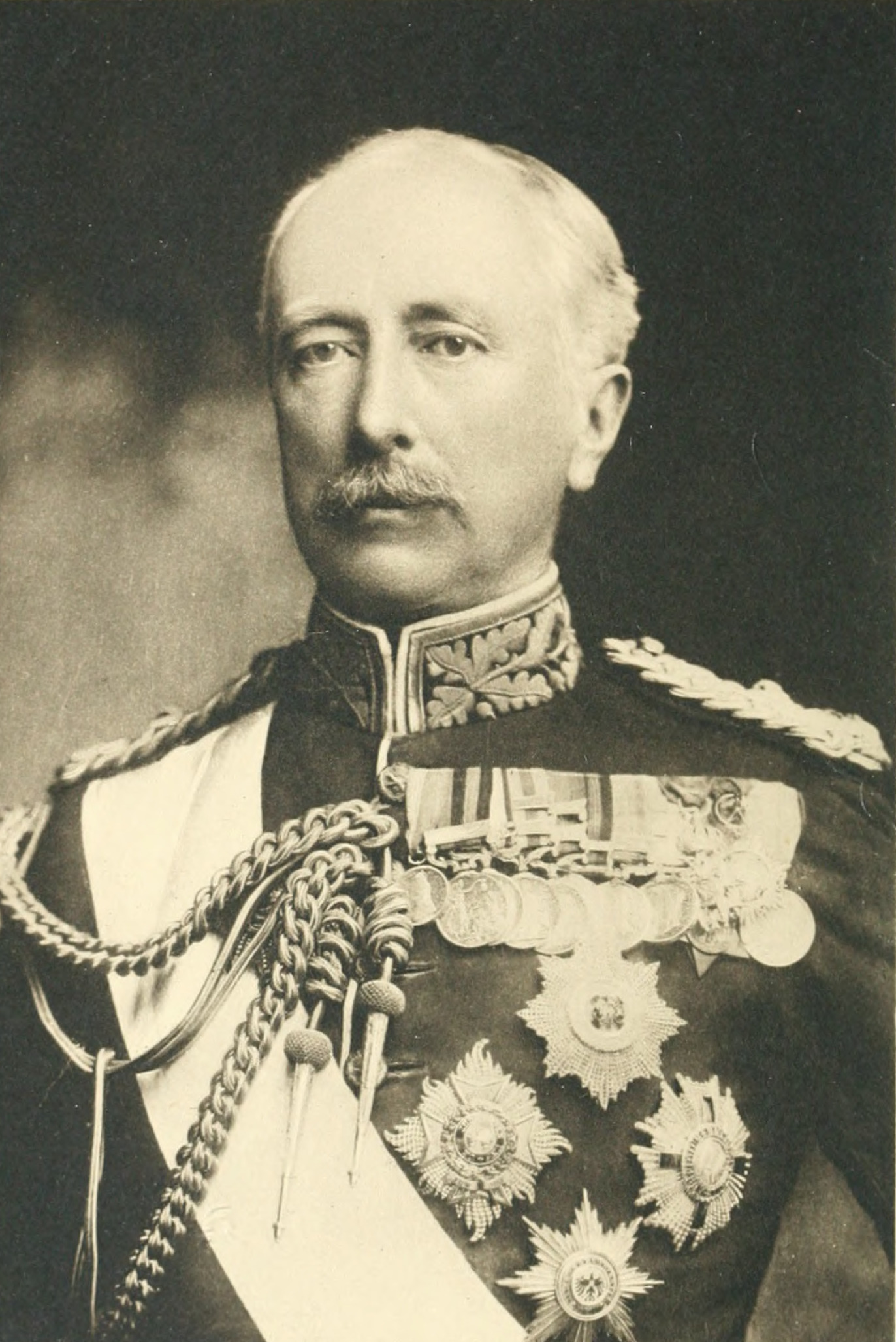
Field Marshal Lord Wolseley

On the same day the first cable was received, Cetshwayo's representatives again appeared. A previous reply to Chelmsford's demands had apparently not reached the British force, but now these envoys bore some of what the British commander had demanded – oxen, a promise of guns and a gift of elephant tusks. The peace was rejected as the terms had not been fully met and Chelmsford turned the envoys away without accepting the elephant tusks and informed them that the advance would only be delayed one day to allow the Zulus to surrender one regiment of their army. The redcoats were now visible from the Royal Kraal and a dismayed Cetshwayo was desperate to end the hostilities. With the enemy in sight, he knew no Zulu regiment would surrender so Cetshwayo sent a further hundred white oxen from his herd along with Prince Napoleon's sword, which the Zulu had taken 1 June 1879 in the skirmish in which the Prince had been killed. The Zulu umCijo regiment, guarding the approaches to the White Umfolozi River where the British were camped, refused to let the oxen pass, deeming it a useless gesture, seeing as it was impossible to meet all Chelmsford's demands, fighting was inevitable. The irate telegram from Wolseley issued on 30 June now reached Chelmsford, and with only 5 mi (8.0 km) between him and a redemptive victory, it was ignored.

== 2nd Division order of battle ==
=== 1st Brigade ===
Commanding Officer; Colonel Richard Glyn.

- 21st (Royal Scots Fusiliers) Regiment of Foot (6 companies).
- 58th (Rutlandshire) Regiment of Foot (6 companies).

=== 2nd Brigade ===
Commanding Officer: Colonel William Collingwood.

- 24th (2nd Warwickshire) Regiment of Foot (7 companies).
- 94th Regiment of Foot (6 companies).

=== Cavalry Brigade ===
Commanding Officer: Major General Frederick Marshall.

- 1st King's Dragoon Guards.
- 17th Lancers (Duke of Cambridge's Own).

=== Flying Column ===
Commanding Officer: Brigadier General Sir Evelyn Wood.

- 13th (1st Somersetshire) Regiment (7 companies).
- 90th Regiment of Foot (Perthshire Volunteers) (8 companies).
- 80th Regiment of Foot (Staffordshire Volunteers) (5 companies).
- Mounted troops under Lieutenant Colonel Redvers Buller.

Accompanied by Royal Engineers, Royal Artillery, Army Service Corps, 2nd Battalion Natal Native Contingent, Army Medical Department, and Natal Native Pioneer Corps.

== Battle ==
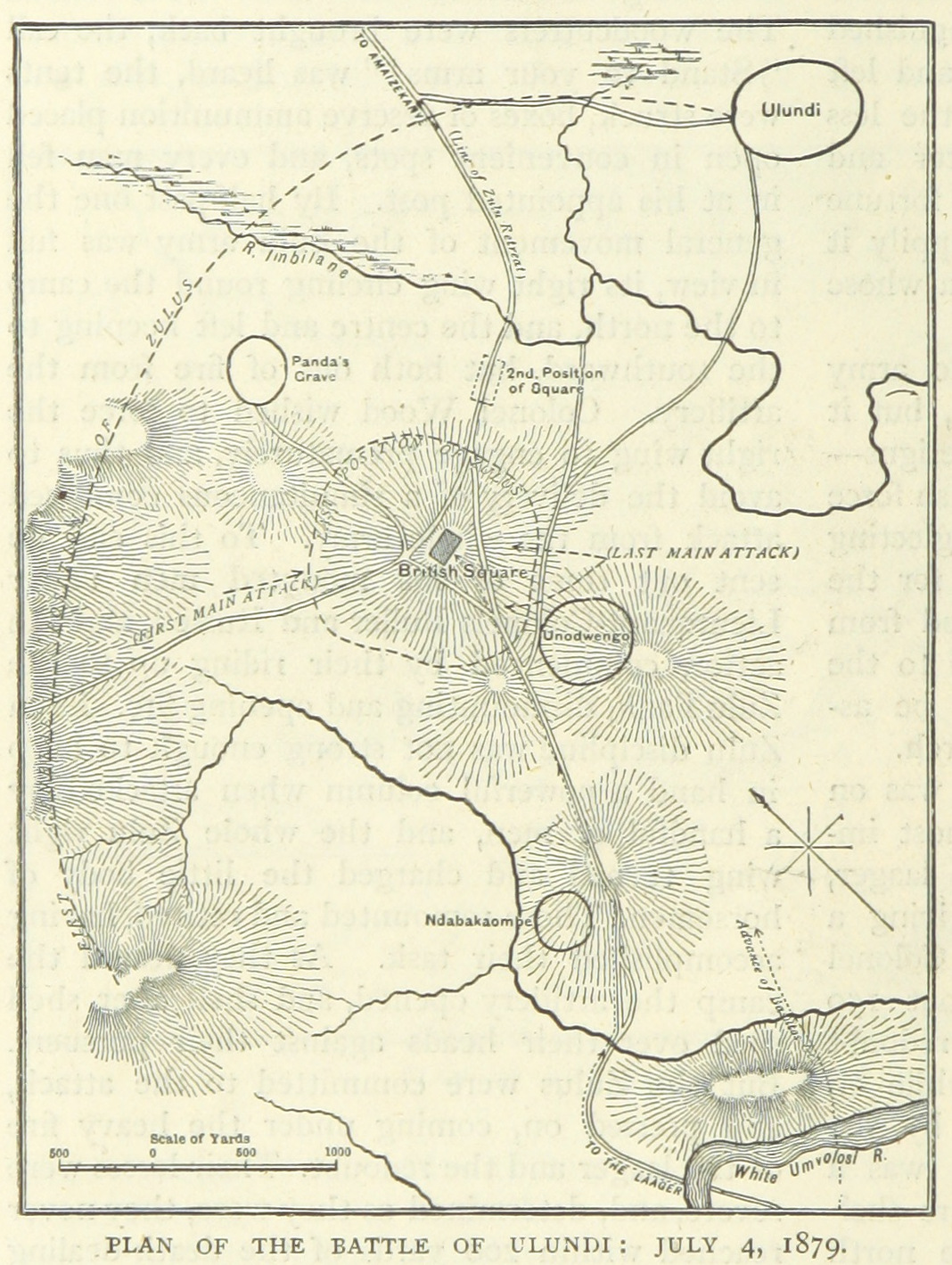
A British map of the battle

On 3 July, with negotiations having broken down, Colonel Redvers Buller led a cavalry force across the river to reconnoitre the ground beyond. A party of Zulus were seen herding goats near the Mbilane stream and troopers moved to round them up. On a hunch, Buller bellowed an order for them to stop and prepare to fire from the saddle. His instinct proved right, for 3,000 Zulus rose from the long grass at that moment and fired a fusillade, before charging forth. Three troopers were shot dead and Buller ordered his men to retire. As they dashed back to the river, Baker's Horse who had been scouting further across, took up position and gave covering fire for the river crossing. Their crossing in turn was covered by the Transvaal Rangers on the opposite bank. This incident had placed the entire reconnaissance in grave danger, but Buller's alertness and leadership saved them from annihilation. Chelmsford was now convinced the Zulus wanted to fight and replied to Wolseley's third message, informing him that he would indeed retreat to the 1st Division if the need arose and that he would be attacking the Zulus the next day.

That evening Chelmsford issued his orders. The British, having learned a bitter lesson at Isandlwana, would take no chances meeting the Zulu army in the open with their normal line of battle. Their advance would begin at first light, prior to forming his infantry into a large hollow square, with mounted troops covering the sides and rear. Neither wagon laagers nor trenches would be used, to convince both the Zulus and critics that a British square could "beat them fairly in the open".

At 6:00 a.m., Buller led out an advance guard of mounted troops and South African irregulars, which after Buller had secured an upper drift (river crossing at a ford), was followed by the infantry, led by the experienced Flying Column battalions. By 7:30 a.m. the column had cleared the rough ground on the other side of the riverbank and their square (in reality a rectangular shape) was formed. At 8:45 a.m.the Zulu engaged the cavalry on the right and left which slowly retired and passed into the square. The leading face was made up of five companies of the 80th Regiment in four ranks, with two Gatling guns in the centres, two 9-pounders on the left flank and two 7-pounders on the right. The 90th Light Infantry with four companies of the 94th Regiment made up the left face with two more 7-pounders. On the right face were the 1st Battalion of the 13th Light Infantry, four companies of the 58th Regiment, two 7-pounders and two 9-pounders. The rear face was composed of two companies of the 94th Regiment, two companies of the 2nd Battalion of the 21st Regiment (Royal Scots Fusiliers). Within the square were headquarters staff, No. 5 Company of the Royal Engineers led by Lieutenant Chard, the 2nd Natal Native Contingent, fifty wagons and carts with reserve ammunition and hospital wagons. Buller's horsemen protected the front and both flanks of the square. A rearguard of two squadrons of the 17th Lancers and a troop of Natal Native Horse followed.

Battalions with Regimental Colours uncased them; the band of the 13th Light Infantry struck up and the 5,317-man strong 'living laager' began its measured advance across the plain. No Zulus in any numbers had been sighted by 8:00 a.m., so the Frontier Light Horse were sent forth to provoke the Zulu. As they rode across the Mbilane stream, the Zulu inGobamkhosi regiment rose out of the grass in front of them, followed by regiment after regiment rising up all around them. The Zulu Army under the command of umNtwana Ziwedu kaMpande - around 12,000 to 15,000 strong, now stood in a horseshoe shape encircling the north, east and southern sides of the square. A Zulu reserve force was also poised to complete the circle. The Zulu ranks stood hammering the ground with their feet and drumming their shields with their assegais. They were made up of veterans and novices with varying degrees of confidence. The mounted troops by the stream opened fire from the saddle to trigger a premature charge before wheeling back to gallop through the gaps made in the infantry lines for them. As the cavalry cleared their front at about 9:00 a.m., the four ranks of the infantry with the front two kneeling, opened fire at 2,000 yd (1,800 m) into the advancing Zulu ranks. The pace of the advance quickened and the range closed between the British lines and the Zulus. The British were ready and the Zulu troops faced concentrated fire. Zulu regiments had to charge forward directly into massed rifle fire, non-stop fire from the Gatling guns and the artillery firing canister shot at point-blank range.

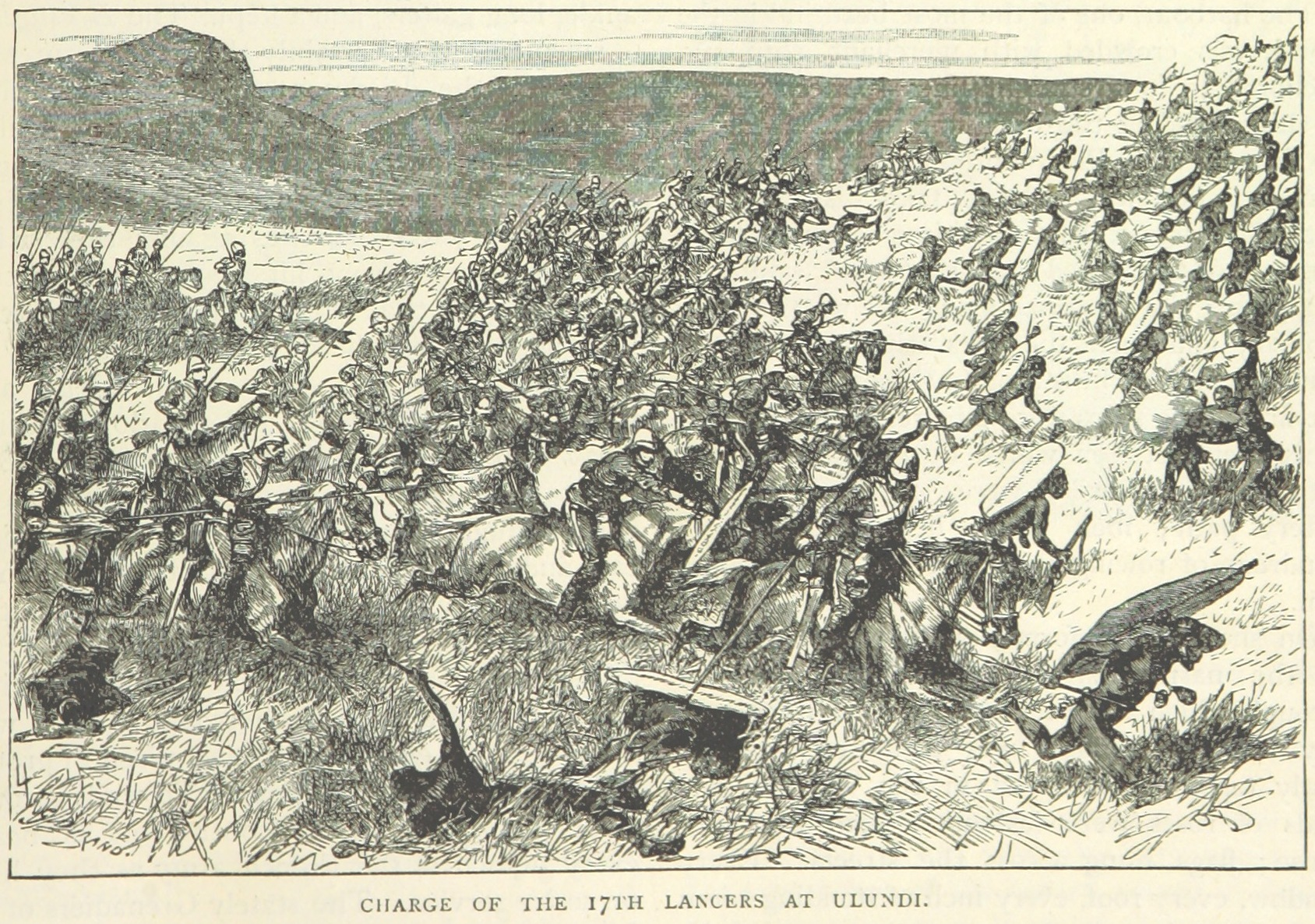
The 17th Lancers charge the Zulus (illustration).

Charges were made by the Zulus, to get close but they could not prevail against the British fire. There were a number of casualties within the square to Zulu marksmen, but the British firing did not waver and no warrior was able to get within 30 yd (27 m) of the British ranks. The Zulu reserve force now rose and charged against the south-west corner of the square. The 9-pounders killed many members of this force, while the infantry opened fire. The speed of the charge made it seem as if the Zulu reserves would get close enough to engage in hand-to-hand combat but no warrior reached the British ranks. Chelmsford ordered the cavalry to mount, and the 17th Lancers, 1st King's Dragoon Guards, colonial cavalry, Native Horse and 2nd Natal Native Contingent charged the now fleeing Zulus. The Zulus fled towards the high ground with cavalry at their heels and shells falling ahead of them. The Lancers were checked at the Mbilane stream by the fire of a concealed party of Zulus, causing several casualties to the cavalrymen before they overcame the resistance. The pursuit continued until not a live Zulu remained on the Mahlabatini plain, with members of the Natal Native Horse, Natal Native Contingent and Wood's Irregulars killing the Zulu wounded, in revenge for similar Zulu actions at Isandlwana.

== Aftermath ==
Sir Garnet Wolseley's camp at Ulundi

After half an hour of concentrated fire from the British artillery, Gatling guns and thousands of infantry, Zulu military power was broken. British casualties were 13 killed; the Zulus suffered approximately 1,500 casualties. On Chelmsford's orders, the Royal Kraal of Ulundi was put to the torch and burned for days. Chelmsford turned over command to Wolseley on 15 July at the fort at St Paul's, leaving for home on 17 July. Chelmsford had partially salvaged his reputation and received a Knight Grand Cross of Bath, largely because of Ulundi. He was severely criticised by the Horse Guards investigation and never served in the field again.

Cetshwayo had been sheltered in a village since 3 July and fled upon hearing news of the defeat at Ulundi. The British forces were dispersed around Zululand in the hunt for Cetshwayo, burning kraals to get his Zulu subjects to surrender him, along with fighting the final small battle to defeat the remaining hostile Zulu battalions. Cetshwayo was captured on 28 August by soldiers under Wolseley's command at a kraal in the middle of the Ngome forest. He was exiled to Cape Town, where he would remain for three years. Wolseley, having replaced Chelmsford and Bartle Frere, swiftly divided Zululand into thirteen districts, the First Partition of Zululand, installing pro-British chiefs in each district. In January 1883, shortly before his death in 1884, Cetshwayo was restored to the throne of a reduced central Zululand in the Second Partition of Zululand. Cetshwayo was the last king of the Zulus to be officially recognised as such by the British. He was succeeded by his son Dinuzulu kaCetshwayo, who ruled until his surrender to the British in 1888 and exile to the island of Saint Helena, although he was still recognised by the Zulus as king until his death in 1913.

== See also ==
- Military history of South Africa

== Bibliography ==
- Chivers, C. J. (2011). The Gun. Simon and Schuster. ISBN 978-0-7432-7173-8.
- Colenso, F. E.; Durnford, E. (1880). History of the Zulu War and its Origin. Assisted in those Portions of the Work which touch upon military Matters by Lieut.-Colonel Edward Durnford. London: Chapman & Hall. OCLC 731088583 – via Archive Foundation.
- Greaves, Adrian (2013). The Tribe that Washed its Spears: The Zulus at War. Pen and Sword. ISBN 978-1-84884-841-2.
- Gump, James O. (1996). The Dust Rose Like Smoke: The Subjugation of the Zulu and the Sioux. Bison Books. ISBN 0-8032-7059-3.
- Hall, D.D. (December 1978). "Artillery in the Zulu War 1879". Military History Journal. 4 (4). South African Military History Society. ISSN 0026-4016.
- Knight, Ian (2005). British Fortifications in Zululand 1879. Oxford: Osprey. ISBN 978-1-84176-829-8.
- Laband, John (2009). Historical Dictionary of the Zulu Wars (PDF). Lanham, MD: Scarecrow Press. ISBN 978-0-8108-6300-2. Archived (PDF) from the original on 16 May 2018.
- Lock, Ron; Quantrill, Peter (2015). Zulu Victory: The Epic of Isandlwana and the Cover-up. Frontline Books. ISBN 978-1-4738-7684-2.
- Macdonald, William (1933). The Romance of the Golden Rand: Being the Romantic Story of the Life and Work of the Pioneers of the Witwatersrand–the World's Greatest Goldfields. London: Cassell. OCLC 4070703.
- Morris, Donald R. (1998). The Washing of the Spears: The Rise And Fall of the Zulu Nation. Da Capo Press. ISBN 978-0-306-80866-1.
- Weltig, Matthew Scott (2008). The Aftermath of the Anglo-Zulu War. Minneapolis, MN: Twenty-First Century Books. ISBN 978-0-8225-7599-3.
