= Kambula =

- Location within KwaZulu-Natal Location within South Africa
- Coordinates: 27.673°S 30.732°E
- Country: South Africa
- Province: KwaZulu-Natal
- District: Zululand
- Municipality: eDumbe
- Time zone: UTC+2 (SAST)

Kambula, Khambula or (Zulu Nkambule) is a town located at 27.66863°S 30.72155°E in the KwaZulu-Natal Province of South Africa.

It is the location where the Battle of Kambula was fought in 1879, the result of which was a British Empire victory over the Zulu people.
