= John Laband =

South African historian (1947–2025)

- Born: 18 March 1947; Johannesburg, South Africa
- Died: 5 August 2025 (aged 78); Greyton, South Africa
- Known for: Historian and writer
- Scientific career
- Fields: Anglo-Zulu and Boer wars
- Workplaces: Wilfrid Laurier University

John Paul Clow Laband (18 March 1947 – 5 August 2025) was a South African historian and writer, specialising in Anglo-Zulu and the First and Second Freedom Wars (Afrikaans: Eerste- en Tweede Vryheidsoorlog). He taught at universities in South Africa, England, and Canada. In particular, he was Professor of History at Wilfrid Laurier University, Canada, and a Research Associate of the University of KwaZulu-Natal.

== Life and career ==
Laband published many books about the military history of Southern Africa and the history of the Zulu nation and the Anglo-Zulu war of 1879 in particular. He was most lately Professor Emeritus at Wilfrid Laurier University, and was made a Life Member of Clare Hall, Cambridge University, England.

Laband died on 5 August 2025, at the age of 78.

== Selected bibliography ==
- Fight Us in the Open; The Anglo-Zulu War Through Zulu Eyes, Pietermaritzburg, 1985
- Kingdom in Crisis: The Zulu Response to the British Invasion of 1879, 1992
- Isandlwana, KwaZulu Monuments Council series, 1992
- Lord Chelmsford's Zululand Campaign 1878–1879, Army Records Society, 1994
- Rope of Sand: The Rise and Fall of the Zulu Kingdom in the Nineteenth Century, 1995, Jonathan Ball Publishers SA, ISBN 9781868420230
- The Illustrated Guide to the Anglo-Zulu War, with Paul Thompson, University of KwaZulu-Natal Press, 2000, ISBN 9781869140557
- The Atlas of the Later Zulu Wars, 1883–1888, University of KwaZulu-Natal Press, 2001, ISBN 9780869809983
- The Transvaal Rebellion: The First Boer War 1880–1881, Taylor & Francis Ltd, 2005, ISBN 9780582772618
- Daily Lives Of Civilians in Wartime Africa, 2007, ISBN 9780313335402
- Zulu Identities: Being Zulu, Past and Present, with Benedict Carton and Jabulani Sithole, C Hurst & Co Publishers Ltd, 2008, ISBN 9781850659082
- Historical Dictionary of the Zulu Wars, Scarecrow Press, 2009, ISBN 9780810860780
- The A to Z of the Zulu Wars, Scarecrow Press, 2010, ISBN 9780810876316
- Bringers of War: The Portuguese in Africa During the Age of Gunpowder and Sail from the 15th to 18th Century, Frontline Books, 2013, ISBN 9781848326583
- Zulu Warriors: The Battle for the South African Frontier, Yale University Press, 2014, ISBN 9780300180312
- Encyclopedia of African Colonial Conflicts, with Timothy J. Stapleton, 2 volumes, ABC-CLIO, Santa Barbara, California, 2016.
- The Battle of Majuba Hill: The Transvaal Campaign, 1880–1881, Helion & Company, 2017, ISBN 9781911512387
- The Assassination of King Shaka, Jonathan Ball Publishers SA, 2017, ISBN 9781868428076
- The Eight Zulu Kings: From Shaka to Goodwill Zwelithini, Jonathan Ball Publishers SA, 2018, ISBN 9781868428380
- The Fall of Rorke's Drift: An Alternate History of the Anglo-Zulu War of 1879, Greenhill Books, 2019, ISBN 9781784383732
- The Land Wars: The Dispossession of the Khosian and AmaXhosa in the Cape Colony, Zebra Press SA, 2020, ISBN 9781776094998
- The Zulu Kingdom and the Boer Invasion of 1837-40, Helion & Company, 2022, ISBN 9781914059896
- In the Shadow of Isandlwana: The Life and Times of General Lord Chelmsford and His Disaster in Zululand, Greenhill Books, 2023, ISBN 9781784387709
