= Mkabayi kaJama =

Zulu princess, daughter of Jama kaNdaba

- Born: c. 1750; EMakhosini Valley, Babanango near Mahlabathini
- Died: 1843; KwaZulu Natal
- Burial: KwaDukuza
- Spouse: Never married
- Father: Jama kaNdaba
- Religion: Zulu traditional religion

Princess Mkabayi kaJama (c. 1750–1843) was a Zulu princess, the head of the Qulusi military kraal, and a regent of the Zulu Kingdom between 1781 and 1787. She persuaded her father, the Zulu King Jama kaNdaba, to remarry, and acted as a regent during the reign of her half-brother, Senzangakhona.

She was a kingmaker for three succeeding reigns, leading coups and arranging assassinations. She is credited for bringing stability in the Zulu nation and ensuring the continuation of the Zulu line and monarchy.

== Early years ==
According to oral history Mkabayi was born a twin, and Zulu custom required that one of the two girls be killed at birth to avoid bad luck and the wrath of the ancestors but Zulu chief Jama acted contrary to tradition and spared both Mkabayi and her sister, Mmame. For this reason, and being of stronger character than her sister, Mkabayi grew up being resented by the Zulu people and was blamed for much of the chiefdom's misfortune.

In 1762, recognising that her father the chief was growing old and still without a son, Mkabayi went about courting Jama a wife who would have a child, his heir, without his knowledge. From this effort, Jama would marry Mthaniya, of the Sibiya clan, who had a son with him. In recognition of Mkabayi's effort to ensure the continuation of the Zulu line and monarch, the child was named Senzangakhona, meaning "we have done accordingly."

== Regency ==
For her role in ensuring an heir to the throne, Mkabayi was able to win the favour of the Zulu people but this did not last for long. In 1781, upon the passing of Jama and recognising that Senzangakhona was too young to ascend the chiefdom, Mkabayi appointed herself regent; something that was unheard of at the time.

== Role in Senzangakhona's reign ==
When Senzangakhona came of age in 1787, Mkabayi stepped down as regent but continued to serve an advisory role to the chief. Additionally, as was custom, unmarried chief's daughters served as head of military units and Mkabayi turned away many suitors to continue serving as the head of the ebaQulusini (the place where they turned out buttocks) unit.

== Role in Shaka's reign ==
After Senzangakhona's passing in 1816, his son Sigujana was due to ascend. Mkabayi, recognising a weakness of character within Sigujana, organised for Senzangakhona's other son, Shaka kaSenzangakhona, to challenge Sigujana. Shaka, along with his mother Nandi kaBhebhe, had been cast away and had settled with and gained the favour of the Mthethwa chief, Dingiswayo.

Learning of Shaka's desire to seize the throne and aware of Shaka's military prowess, Sigujana fled, allowing Shaka to ascend the throne as king (instead of chief). During the reign of Shaka, Mkabayi continued to serve as a close advisor to the king and head of ebaQulusini. There, she founded the abaQulusi tribe which had a determining role in the wars to come.

After Nandi's death, Shaka was accused of abusing power and wishing to preserve the Zulu kingdom Shaka had since built, Mkabayi plotted with Dingane kaSenzangakhona and Mhlangana kaSenzangakhona to assassinate Shaka and, wishing to ensure Dingane's ascension to the throne, Mkabayi later organised for Mhlangana to be assassinated as well.

== Role in Dingane's reign and death ==
During the reign of Dingane, Mkabayi would again continue to serve the roles she had served under Shaka and Senzangakhona, repeatedly turning away suitors who requested her hand in marriage in order to serve the growing Zulu kingdom. However, when Mpande kaSenzangakhona defeated Dingane and assumed the throne in 1840, Mkabayi was banished to Natal, age 89.

She died 3 years later in 1843.
