= Zulu royal family =

South African aristocracy

- Country: KwaZulu-Natal, South Africa
- Founder: Zulu I kaMalandela
- Current head: Misuzulu Sinqobile
- Titles: King, natively: Ingonyama yamaZulu

The Zulu royal family (Zulu: abakwaZulu, lit. 'people of the place of Zulu') consists of the King of the Zulu Nation, his consorts, and all of his legitimate descendants. The legitimate descendants of all previous kings are also sometimes considered to be members.

== History ==
King Misuzulu kaZwelithini's great-great-great-great-grandfather, King Mpande, as a half-brother of the Zulu King Shaka, reigned from 1840 to 1872. Shaka's policies and conquests transformed a small clan into one of South Africa's most influential pre-colonial powers, extending over much of what is now KwaZulu-Natal.

The Nguni-speaking clan of the southern Bantus, which evolved into the Zulu people, takes its name from the third of its recorded chiefs. Malandela, believed to have reigned in the early part of the sixteenth century, is the patrilineal ancestor of the present king, whose lineage comes down from him through Chief Senzangakhona to the latter's son, Shaka. Originally part of the early nineteenth century Mtetwa Empire of Dingiswayo, the Zulus united, expanded and founded an independent empire under King Shaka who, however, never married. The dynasty continued with his half-brothers, Dingane and later King Mpande, who abandoned his brother Dingane to side with the Boers. The Boers' Commandant-General Andries Pretorius recognized Mpande's borders in 1840. Mpande had at least 28 children by different wives, many of whom have living descendants. In 1887 the British annexed Zululand, effectively mediatising the Zulu dynasty as paramount chiefs in the region. The Zulu people and dynasty retained their distinct cultural identity and a measure of independence under the governments of South Africa through the establishment of Zululand as a bantustan and the subsequent abolition of apartheid in the Republic.

As paramount chief within the Republic of South Africa and pursuant to the preservation of African traditional leadership, the hereditary head of the Zulu dynasty retains kingly dignity, ethnic leadership, ritual authority and a civil list, reigning but not ruling in KwaZulu Natal in conjunction with the province's UNdunankulu weSizwe samaZulu. The dynasty is Christian and practices polygamy, agnates of the dynasty bearing the prefix "Prince/Princess" and the surname "Zulu", while holding the rank of KaBhekuZulu, (i.e. prince of the Blood).

== Incumbent and family ==
The present head of the Zulu royal family is King Misuzulu kaZwelithini. He was announced as the king on the day of the funeral of his mother, Queen Regent Mantfombi Dlamini, who died unexpectedly on 29 April 2021.

Dlamini was appointed as the interim leader of the Zulu Kingdom as the regent on 21 March 2021 after King Goodwill Zwelithini, the monarch of the Zulu nation of South Africa, died on 12 March 2021.

At the time of his death, King Goodwill Zwelethini had six wives and 28 children. His heir Misuzulu has six children; two with his wife Queen Ntokozo, and one from his relationship with Princess Wesizwe Sigcau of the Mpondo people.

=== Consort ===
- Queen Ntokozo Mayisela-Zulu
- Queen Nozizwe Mulela-Zulu
- Queen Nomzamo Myeni-Zulu
- Queen Sihle Mdhuli-Zulu

== King list ==
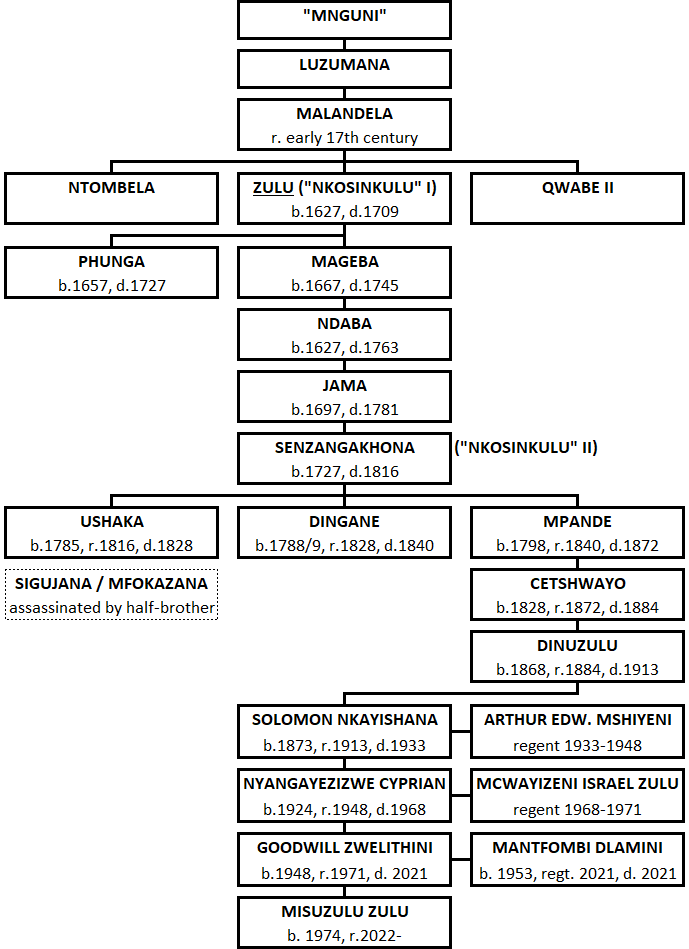
Genealogy of the Zulu kings. Sources vary concerning the earlier kings (shown without dates)

1. Mnguni I
2. Lufenu
3. Gumede
4. Yeye
5. Mnguni II
6. Mdlani
7. Luzumana
8. Malandela kaLuzumana, son of Luzumana
9. Zulu I kaMalandela, son of Malandela
10. Nkosinkulu
11. Ntombela
12. Zulu II kaNtombela, founder and chief of the Zulu clan from c. 1709
13. Gumede kaZulu II, son of Zulu II, chief of the Zulu clan
14. Phunga kaGumede (d. 1727), son of Gumede, chief of the Zulu clan up to 1727
15. Mageba kaGumede (ca. 1667–1745), son of Gumede and brother of Phunga, chief of the Zulu clan from 1727 to 1745
16. Ndaba kaMageba (ca. 1697–1763), son of Mageba, chief of the Zulu clan from 1745 to 1763
17. Jama kaNdaba (ca. 1757–1781), son of Ndaba, chief of the Zulu clan from 1763 to 1781
18. Mkabayi kaJama, daughter of Jama
19. Senzangakhona kaJama (ca. 1757–1816), son of Jama, chief of the Zulu clan from 1781 to 1816
20. Shaka kaSenzangakhona (ca. 1787–1828), son of Senzangakona, king from 1816 to 1828
21. Dingane kaSenzangakhona (ca. 1795–1840), son of Senzangakhona and half-brother of Shaka, king from 1828 to 1840
22. Mpande kaSenzangakhona (1798–1872), son of Senzangakhona and half-brother of Shaka and Dingane, king from 1840 to 1872
23. Cetshwayo kaMpande (1834 – February 1884), son of Mpande, king from 1872 to 1884
24. Dinuzulu kaCetshwayo (1868–1913), son of Cetshwayo kaMpande, king from 1884 to 1913
25. Phumuzuzulu kaDinuzulu (1890–1933), son of Dinuzulu kaCetshwayo, king from 1913 to 1933
26. Cyprian Bhekuzulu kaPhumuzuzulu (4 August 1924 – 17 September 1968), son of Solomon kaDinuzulu, king from 1948 to 1968
27. Goodwill Zwelithini kaBhekuzulu (14 July 1948 – 12 March 2021), son of Cyprian Bhekuzulu kaSolomon, king from 1971 to 2021
28. Misuzulu Zulu kaZwelithini (23 September 1974), son of Goodwill Zwelithini kaCyprian Bhekuzulu, king since 2022

Misuzulu's heir apparent is Crown Prince Jubezizweni (b. 2001).
