= Shaka Zulu (TV series) =

1986 South African television miniseries

- Title sequence
- Genre: Historical fiction
- Created by: Ed Harper
- Based on: Shaka Zulu by Joshua Sinclair
- Written by: William C. Faure; Joshua Sinclair
- Directed by: William C. Faure
- Starring: Henry Cele; Edward Fox; Robert Powell; Trevor Howard; Fiona Fullerton; Christopher Lee; Dudu Mkhize; Roy Dotrice; Gordon Jackson; Kenneth Griffith; Conrad Magwaza; Patrick Ndlovu; Roland Mqwebu; Gugu Nxumalo; Tu Nokwe; Daphney Hlomuka
- Opening theme: "We Are Growing", performed by Margaret Singana
- Composer: Dave Pollecutt
- Country of origin: South Africa
- Original languages: English; Zulu
- No. of series: 1
- No. of episodes: 10

Production
- Executive producer: Leon Rautenbach
- Production locations: Natal, South Africa
- Cinematography: Alec Mills
- Editors: Bill Lenny A.C.E; Ettie Feldman
- Running time: 54–55 minutes
- Production company: South African Broadcasting Corporation
- Budget: R 27 million

Original release
- Network: SABC TV2/TV3
- Release: 24 October – 19 December 1986

Shaka Zulu is a 1986 South African television series directed by William C. Faure and written by Joshua Sinclair for the South African Broadcasting Corporation (SABC), based on his 1985 novel of the same name.

It focuses on the rise of the Zulu, and their leader, Shaka, his wars, and the British administration. The series consists of 10 episodes of approximately 55 minutes each. It was aired in South Africa from October, and in the United States in syndication from November.

== Plot ==
The series is based on the story of the king of the Zulu, Shaka (reigned 1816 to 1828), and the writings of the British traders with whom he interacted. It also covers the broader Mfecane period alongside the rapid expansion of the Zulu state. The story is described primarily via flashbacks by Dr Henry Fynn, an Irish physician.

== Production ==
The series was written for the South African Broadcasting Corporation (SABC) by Joshua Sinclair, based on his 1985 novel of the same name. Harmony Gold USA partly funded and distributed Shaka Zulu in spite of the economic sanctions at the time. It was directed by William C. Faure. The executive producer was Leon Rautenbach, and the composer was Dave Pollecutt.

Lead actor Henry Cele was an international star, performing in his native South Africa and in the United States as well. He was selected for the role after performing the same role in a South African stage production of the same name.

Cele appeared again in 2001 as Shaka in the 3-hour 2-part miniseries, also written and directed by Sinclair, called Shaka Zulu: The Citadel. Set in winter 1827, Fox also reprised his role as Farewell, and also starred David Hasselhoff and Karen Allen. It was also released in a 2-hour telemovie version called Shaka Zulu: The Last Great Warrior.

Simon Sabela also organised the dance routines in the original 1964 Zulu film, and played Cetshwayo in Zulu Dawn in 1979.

== Cast ==
- Henry Cele – Shaka
- Edward Fox – Lieutenant Francis Farewell
- Robert Powell – Dr. Henry Fynn/Narrator
- Trevor Howard – Lord Charles Henry Somerset
- Sokesimbone Kubheka – King Cetshwayo
- Fiona Fullerton – Elizabeth Farewell
- Christopher Lee – Lord Bathurst
- Dudu Mkhize – Nandi
- Roy Dotrice – King George IV
- Gordon Jackson – Professor Bramston
- Kenneth Griffith – Zacharias Abrahams
- Conrad Magwaza – Senzangakhona
- Patrick Ndlovu – Mudli
- Roland Mqwebu – Ngomane
- Gugu Nxumalo – Mkabayi
- Tu Nokwe – Pampata
- Washington Sixolo – Bhebhe
- Daphney Hlomuka – Queen Ntombazi
- Simon Sabela – Dingiswayo.
- Nomsa Xaba – Sitayi the isangoma
- Glen Gabela – Teenage Shaka
- Khumbulani Cele (Henry's real-life son) as Young Shaka

== Episodes ==
No.	Directed by	Written by	Runtime	Original release date	US air date
1	William C. Faure	William C. Faure; Joshua Sinclair	55 minutes	24 October 1986	24 November 1986
Commencing in 1823, it introduces the main characters, including Shaka, Lieutenant Francis Farewell and Dr. Henry Fynn, against a background of increasing fear of a Zulu attack on the Cape Colony.
2	William C. Faure	William C. Faure; Joshua Sinclair	55 minutes	31 October 1986	1 December 1986
After Farewell's expedition is shipwrecked, they are taken to Shaka's capital, Kwa Bulawayo. Here, cultures clash as Shaka seeks to master their technology.
3	William C. Faure	William C. Faure; Joshua Sinclair	55 minutes	7 November 1986	8 December 1986
Fynn narrates the backstory of Shaka's illegitimate birth in 1787, to Senzangakona, a prince of the Zulu, and Nandi, a woman of the Elangeni.
4	William C. Faure	William C. Faure; Joshua Sinclair	55 minutes	14 November 1986	15 December 1986
Nandi's tribe compels Senzangakona to accept her as a second wife. However, after nine further marriages in as many years, she is often humiliated by Senzangakhona and goes back to the Elangeni kingdom where she and Shaka are constantly humiliated and flees into exile with her children and her mother who dies of starvation. Nandi and her children take refuge among the Qwabe people.
5	William C. Faure	William C. Faure; Joshua Sinclair	55 minutes	21 November 1986	22 December 1986
As Shaka grows up, he is forced to flee his home among the Qwabe when his father, Senzangakhona and his people are looking for him. In 1815, he is helped by Dingiswayo of the Mtetwa, where he begins formulating his new military disciplines.
6	William C. Faure	William C. Faure; Joshua Sinclair	55 minutes	28 November 1986	29 December 1986
Shaka trains his new military unit into an elite fighting force. After his father dies, in 1817, his half-brother becomes king but Shaka assassinates him at his initiation and assumes total control.
7	William C. Faure	William C. Faure; Joshua Sinclair	55 minutes	5 December 1986	5 January 1987
The story moves ahead to 1824 when an attempt is made on Shaka's life by his half-brother. Surviving with the help of Fynn, Shaka grants Farewell lands and trading rights in perpetuity.
8	William C. Faure	William C. Faure; Joshua Sinclair	54 minutes	12 December 1986	12 January 1987
Realising the legacy power of the written word, Shaka begins narrating stories of his rise, including surreal and occult aspects, to Fynn. It also covers the beheading of Dingiswayo during the conflict with Zwide.
9	William C. Faure	William C. Faure; Joshua Sinclair	54 minutes	19 December 1986	19 January 1987
In 1827, the sailors at Port Natal build a boat, with Zulu assistance, and sail envoys to Cape Town where they are poorly received. Meanwhile, Shaka has his illegitimate son killed and his mother becomes ill.
10	William C. Faure	William C. Faure; Joshua Sinclair	54 minutes	19 December 1986	26 January 1987
Nandi dies, sending Shaka into a dangerous mindset where the Zulu nation should suffer too. Farewell's party returns in 1828 to find widespread chaos and devastation, culminating in Shaka's assassination.

== Reception ==
The series had a mixed reception among both black and white audiences in South Africa. It was well received overseas, gaining one of the highest audiences for a TV series in Germany. In Los Angeles it was shown on KCOP-TV, which received its highest-ever rating for the show. Although popular, the series was criticised by The Los Angeles Times for its character portrayals and focus on violence. The New York Times reviewed it positively, describing the series as an "enthralling television exercise" but noted public suspicion of it at the time due to the financial support the series received from then apartheid government of South Africa.

Donald Morris wrote that it was one of the most repeatedly viewed miniseries in North American television at the time having been watched by over 350 million viewers.

Shaka Zulu was broadcast in Singapore on SBC 12 in 1986, in spite of the film's depiction of nudity (which was controversial at the time), and received well by local "arts enthusiasts".

In 2021, NewRetroWave gave it a positive review for its cinematography and strong acting performances.

== Soundtrack ==
The theme song of the series, "We Are Growing", was sung by Margaret Singana.

=== Charts ===
Chart (1987-1989)	Peak position
Australia (Kent Music Report)	62
Belgium - Flanders (Ultratop 50 Singles (Flanders))	8
Netherlands (Single Top 100)	1
