= Impi =

Zulu armed body of men or regiment

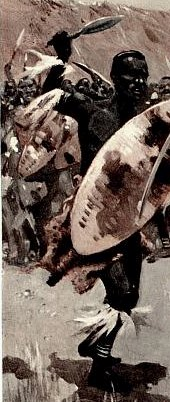
The impi was a military formation that transformed the face of southern Africa, on into east and central Africa. Its highest development took place under Shaka, initiator of several important organizational, weapon and tactical innovations.

Impi is a Nguni word meaning war or combat and by association any body of men gathered for war; for example, impi ya masosha is a term denoting an army. Impi were formed from regiments (amabutho) from large militarised homesteads (amakhanda). In English impi is often used to refer to a Zulu regiment, which is called an ibutho in Zulu, or the army of the Zulu Kingdom.

Its beginnings lie far back in historic local warfare customs, when groups of armed men called impi battled. They were systematised radically by the Zulu king Shaka, who was then only the exiled illegitimate son of king Senzangakhona kaJama, but already showing much prowess as a general in the army (impi) of Mthethwa king Dingiswayo in the Ndwandwe–Zulu War of 1817–1819.

== Genesis ==
The Zulu impi is popularly identified with the ascent of Shaka, ruler of the relatively small Zulu tribe before its explosion across the landscape of southern Africa, but its earliest shape as an instrument of statecraft lies in the innovations of the Mthethwa chieftain Dingiswayo, according to some historians (Morris 1965). These innovations in turn drew upon existing tribal customs, such as the iNtanga. This was an age grade tradition common among many of the Bantu peoples of the continent's southern region. Young men were organised into age groups, with each cohort responsible for certain duties and tribal ceremonies. Periodically, the older age grades were summoned to the kraals of sub-chieftains, or inDunas, for consultations, assignments, and an induction ceremony that marked their transition from boys to full-fledged adults and warriors, the ukuButwa. Kraal or settlement elders generally handled local disputes and issues. Above them were the inDunas, and above the inDunas stood the chief of a particular clan lineage or tribe. The inDunas handled administrative matters for their chiefs – ranging from settlement of disputes to the collection of taxes. In times of war, the inDunas supervised the fighting men in their areas, forming leadership of the military forces deployed for combat. The age grade iNtangas, under the guidance of the inDunas, formed the basis for the systematic regimental organisation that would become known worldwide as the impi.

=== Limited nature of early tribal warfare ===
Warfare was of low intensity among the KwaZulu Natal tribes prior to the rise of Shaka, though it occurred frequently. Objectives were typically limited to such matters as cattle raiding, avenging some personal insult, or resolving disputes over segments of grazing land. Generally a loose mob, called an impi participated in these melees. There were no campaigns of extermination against the defeated. They simply moved on to other open spaces on the veldt, and equilibrium was restored.

The bow and arrow were known but seldom used. Warfare, like the hunt, depended on skilled spearmen and trackers. The primary weapon was a thin six-foot (1.8 m) throwing spear, the assegai; several were carried into combat. Defensive equipment included a small cowhide shield, which was later improved by King Shaka. Many battles were prearranged, with the clan warriors meeting at an agreed place and time while women and children of the clan watched from some distance away. Ritualized taunts, single combats and tentative charges were the typical pattern. If the affair did not dissipate before, one side might find enough courage to mount a sustained attack and drive their enemies. Casualties were usually light. The defeated clan might pay in lands or cattle and have captives to be ransomed but extermination and mass casualties were rare. Tactics were rudimentary.

Outside the ritual battles, the quick raid was the most frequent combat action, marked by burning kraals, seizure of captives, and the driving off of cattle. Pastoral herders and light agriculturalists, the Bantu did not usually build permanent fortifications to fend off enemies. A clan under threat simply packed their meagre material possessions, rounded up their cattle and fled until the marauders were gone. If the marauders did not stay to permanently dispossess them of grazing areas, the fleeing clan might return to rebuild in a day or two. The genesis of the Zulu impi thus lies in tribal structures existing long before the coming of Europeans or the Shaka era.

=== Rise of Dingiswayo ===
In the early 19th century, a combination of factors began to change the customary pattern. These included rising populations, the growth of white settlement and slaving that dispossessed native peoples both at the Cape and in Portuguese Mozambique, and the rise of ambitious "new men." One such man, a warrior called Dingiswayo (the Troubled One) of the Mthethwa rose to prominence. Historians such as Donald Morris hold that his political genius laid the basis for a relatively light hegemony. This was established through a combination of diplomacy and conquest, using not extermination or slavery, but strategic reconciliation and judicious force of arms. This hegemony reduced the frequent feuding and fighting among the small clans in the Mthethwa's orbit, transferring their energies to more centralised forces. Under Dingiswayo the age grades came to be regarded as military drafts, deployed more frequently to maintain the new order. It was from these small clans, including among them the eLangeni and the Zulu, that Shaka sprung.

== Ascent and innovations of Shaka ==
Shaka proved himself to be one of Dingiswayo's most able warriors after the military call up of his age grade to serve in the Mthethwa forces. He fought with his iziCwe regiment wherever he was assigned during this early period, but from the beginning, Shaka's approach to battle did not fit the traditional mould. He began to implement his own individual methods and style, designing the famous short stabbing spear the iKlwa, a larger, stronger shield, and discarding the oxhide sandals that he felt slowed him down. These methods proved effective on a small scale, but Shaka himself was restrained by his overlord. His conception of warfare was far more extreme than the reconciliatory methods of Dingiswayo. He sought to bring combat to a swift and bloody decision, as opposed to duels of individual champions, scattered raids, or limited skirmishes where casualties were comparatively light. While his mentor and overlord Dingiswayo lived, Shaka's methods were reined in, but the removal of this check gave the Zulu chieftain a much broader scope. It was under his rule that a much more rigorous mode of tribal warfare came into being. This newer, brutal focus demanded changes in weapons, organisation and tactics.

=== Weapons and shields ===
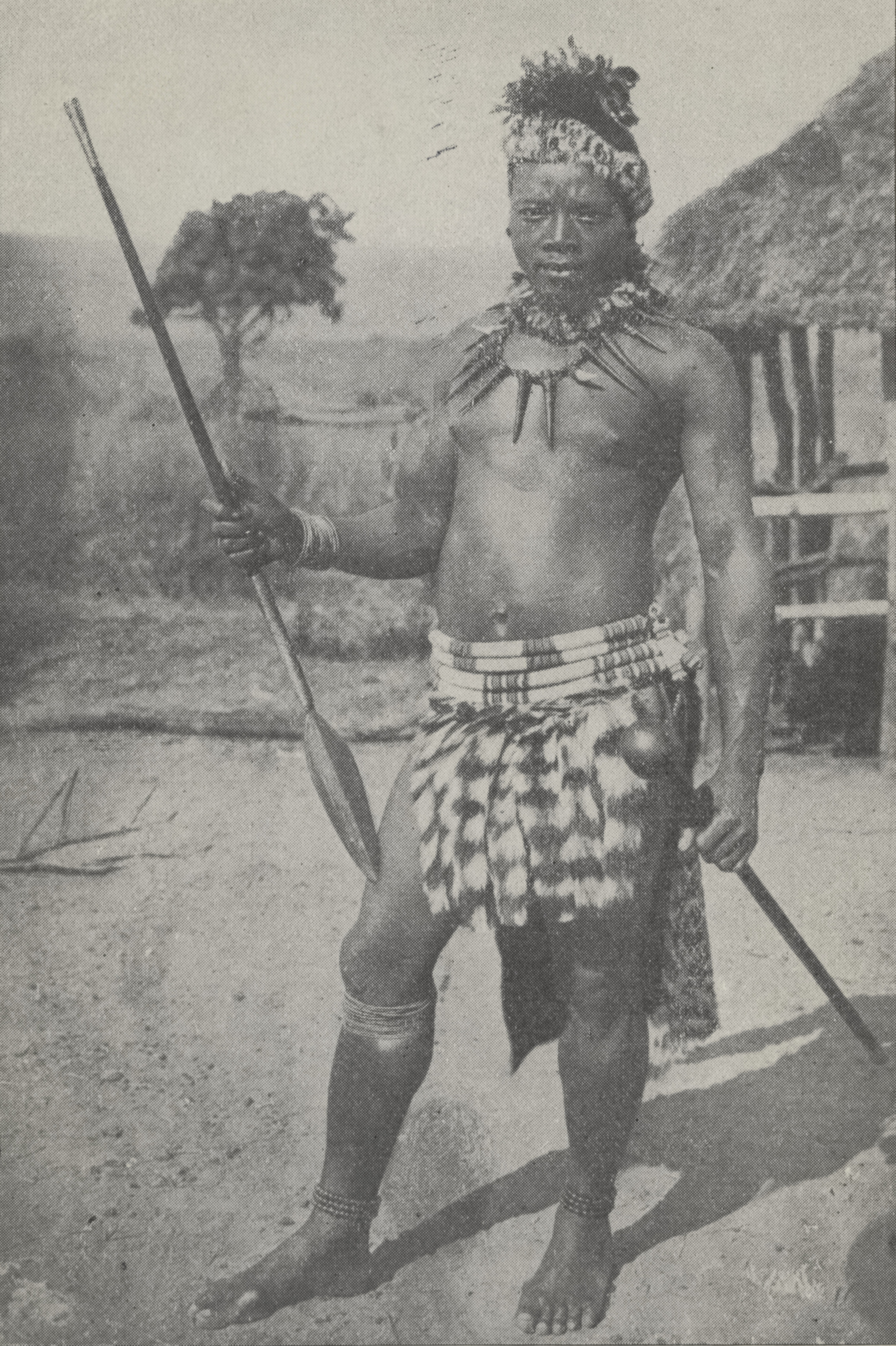
Zulu warrior armed with the iklwa stabbing spear (assegai) and iwisa club (knobkerrie). His kilt is of genet tails

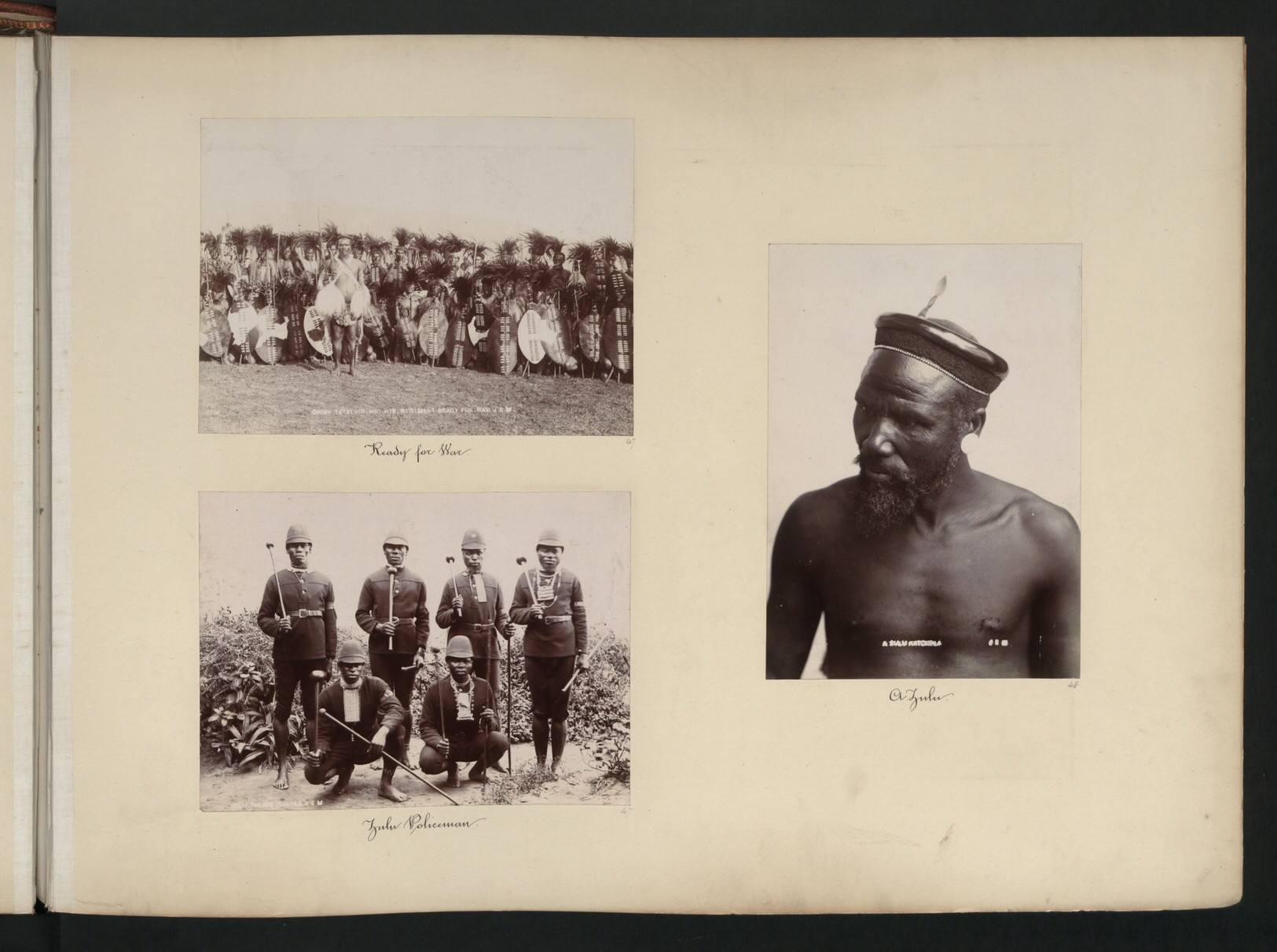
"Ready for War"; "A Zulu"; "Zulu Policemen" – the man pictured to the right wears the head-ring (isicoco) denoting his married status

Shaka is credited with introducing a new variant of the traditional weapon, demoting the long, spindly throwing spear in favour of a heavy-bladed, short-shafted stabbing spear. He is also said to have introduced a larger, heavier cowhide shield (isihlangu), and trained his forces to engage the enemy in more effective hand-to-hand combat. The throwing spear was not discarded, but standardised like the stabbing implement and carried as a missile weapon, typically discharged at the foe, before close contact. These weapons changes integrated with and facilitated an aggressive mobility and tactical organisation.

As weapons, the Zulu warrior carried the iklwa stabbing spear (losing one could result in execution) and a club or cudgel fashioned from dense hardwood known in Zulu as the iwisa, usually called the knobkerrie or knobkerry in English and knopkierie in Afrikaans, for beating an enemy in the manner of a mace. Zulu officers often carried the half-moon-shaped Zulu ax (isizenze), but this weapon was more of a symbol to show their rank. The iklwa – so named because of the sucking sound it made when withdrawn from a human body – with its long 25 centimetres (9.8 in) and broad blade was an invention of Shaka that superseded the older thrown ipapa (so named because of the "pa-pa" sound it made as it flew through the air). The iklwa could theoretically be used both in melee and as a thrown weapon, but warriors were forbidden in Shaka's day from throwing it, which would disarm them and give their opponents something to throw back. Moreover, Shaka felt it discouraged warriors from closing into hand-to-hand combat.

Shaka's brother and successor, Dingane kaSenzangakhona reintroduced greater use of the throwing spear, perhaps as a counter to Boer firearms.

As early as Shaka's reign small numbers of firearms, often obsolete muskets and rifles, were obtained by the Zulus from Europeans by trade. In the aftermath of the defeat of the British at the Battle of Isandlwana in 1879, many Martini–Henry rifles were captured by the Zulus together with considerable amounts of ammunition. The advantage of this capture is debatable due to the alleged tendency of Zulu warriors to close their eyes when firing such weapons. The possession of firearms did little to change Zulu tactics, which continued to rely on a swift approach to the enemy to bring him into close combat.

All warriors carried a shield made of oxhide, which retained the hair, with a central stiffening shaft of wood, the mgobo. Shields were the property of the king; they were stored in specialised structures raised off the ground for protection from vermin when not issued to the relevant regiment. The large isihlangu shield of Shaka's day was about five feet in length and was later partially replaced by the smaller umbumbuluzo, a shield of identical manufacture but around three and a half feet in length. Close combat relied on co-ordinated use of the iklwa and shield. The warrior sought to get the edge of his shield behind the edge of his enemy's, so that he could pull the enemy's shield to the side, thus opening him to a thrust with the iklwa deep into the abdomen or chest.

=== Logistics ===
The fast-moving host, like all military formations, needed supplies. These were provided by young boys, who were attached to a force and carried rations, cooking pots, sleeping mats, extra weapons and other material. Cattle were sometimes driven on the hoof as a movable larder. Again, such arrangements in the local context were probably nothing unusual. What was different was the systematisation and organisation, a pattern yielding major benefits when the Zulu were dispatched on raiding missions.

=== Age-grade regimental system ===
Age-grade groupings of various sorts were common in the Bantu tribal culture of the day, and indeed are still important in much of Africa. Age grades were responsible for a variety of activities, from guarding the camp, to cattle herding, to certain rituals and ceremonies. It was customary in Zulu culture for young men to provide limited service to their local chiefs until they were married and recognised as official householders. Shaka manipulated this system, transferring the customary service period from the regional clan leaders to himself, strengthening his personal hegemony. Such groupings on the basis of age, did not constitute a permanent, paid military in the modern Western sense, nevertheless they did provide a stable basis for sustained armed mobilisation, much more so than ad hoc tribal levies or war parties.

Shaka organised the various age grades into regiments, and quartered them in special military kraals, with each regiment having its own distinctive names and insignia. Some historians argue that the large military establishment was a drain on the Zulu economy and necessitated continual raiding and expansion. This may be true since large numbers of the society's men were isolated from normal occupations, but whatever the resource impact, the regimental system was clearly built on existing tribal cultural elements that could be adapted and shaped to fit an expansionist agenda.

After their 20th birthdays, young men would be sorted into formal ibutho (plural amabutho) or regiments. They would build their i=handa (often referred to as a 'homestead', as it was basically a stockade group of huts surrounding a corral for cattle), their gathering place when summoned for active service. Active service continued until a man married, a privilege only the king bestowed. The amabutho were recruited on the basis of age rather than regional or tribal origin. The reason for this was to enhance the centralised power of the Zulu king at the expense of clan and tribal leaders. They swore loyalty to the king of the Zulu nation.

=== Mobility, training and insignia ===
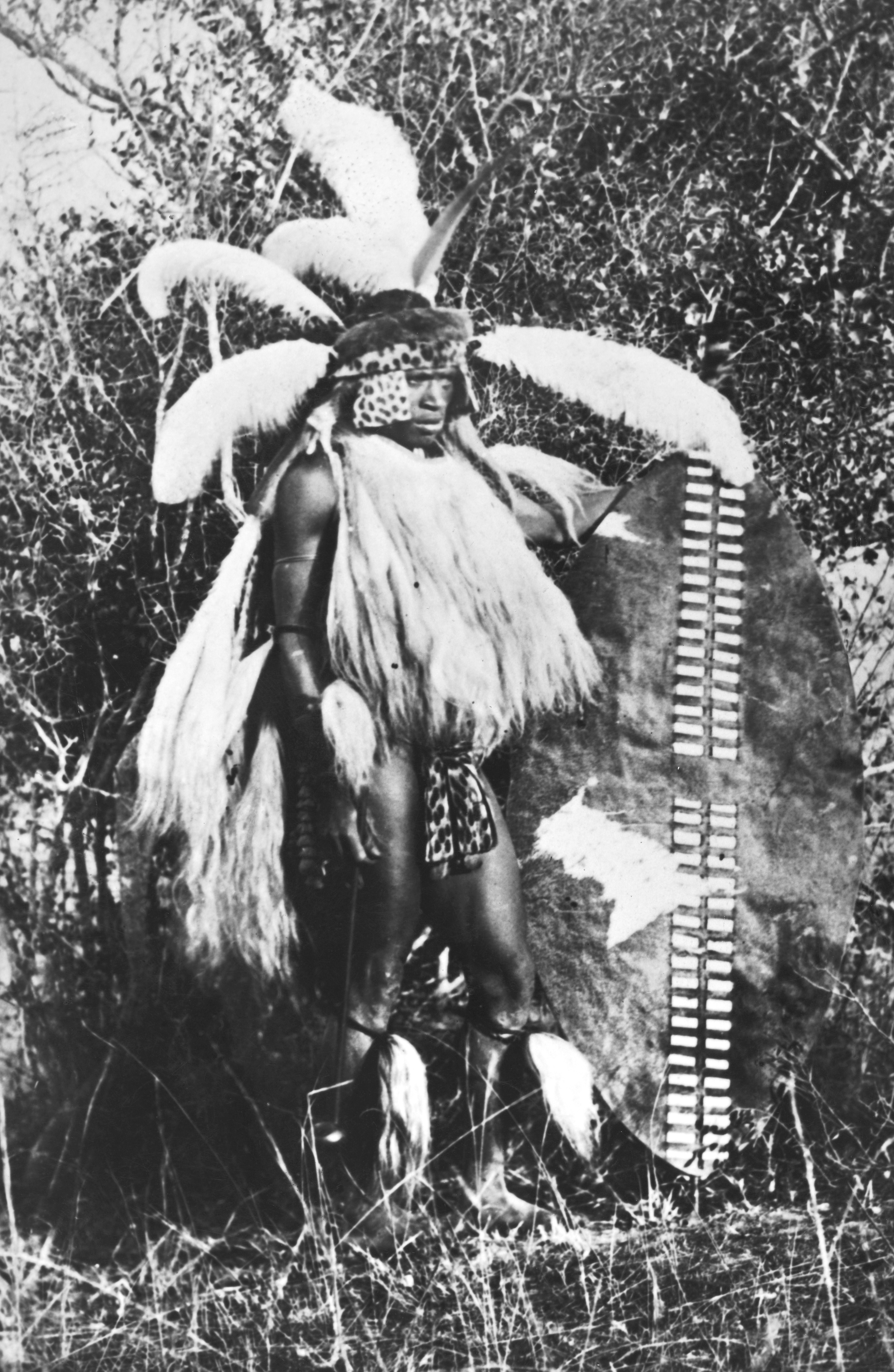
Zulu warrior in full regimental regalia, carrying the large isihlangu war shield. c. 1860. The upper body is covered in cow tails, the kilt is of spotted cat, genet or civet skin and the shins are decorated with cowtails. The elaborate headdress consists of a browband and face-framing flaps of leopard skin with another band of otter skin above. There are multiple ostrich feather plumes and a single upright crane's feather.

Shaka discarded sandals to enable his warriors to run faster. Initially the move was unpopular, but those who objected were simply killed, a practice that quickly concentrated the minds of remaining personnel. Zulu tradition indicates that Shaka hardened the feet of his troops by having them stamp thorny tree and bush branches flat. Shaka drilled his troops frequently, implementing forced marches covering more than fifty miles a day. He also drilled the troops to carry out encirclement tactics (see below). Such mobility gave the Zulu a significant impact in their local region and beyond. Upkeep of the regimental system and training seems to have continued after Shaka's death, although Zulu defeats by the Boers, and growing encroachment by British colonists, sharply curtailed raiding operations prior to the War of 1879. Morris (1965, 1982) records one such mission under King Mpande to give green warriors of the uThulwana regiment experience: a raid into Swaziland, dubbed "Fund' uThulwana" by the Zulu, or "Teach the uThulwana".

Impi warriors were trained as early as age six, joining the army as udibi porters at first, being enrolled into same-age groups (intanga). Until they were buta'd, Zulu boys accompanied their fathers and brothers on campaign as servants. Eventually, they would go to the nearest ikhanda to kleza (literally, "to drink directly from the udder"), at which time the boys would become inkwebane, cadets. They would spend their time training until they were formally enlisted by the king. They would challenge each other to stick fights, which had to be accepted on pain of dishonor.

In Shaka's day, warriors often wore elaborate plumes and cow tail regalia in battle, but by the Anglo-Zulu War of 1879, many warriors wore only a loin cloth and a minimal form of headdress. The later period Zulu soldier went into battle relatively simply dressed, painting his upper body and face with chalk and red ochre, despite the popular conception of elaborately panoplied warriors. Each ibutho had a singular arrangement of headdress and other adornments, so that the Zulu army could be said to have had regimental uniforms; latterly the 'full-dress' was only worn on festive occasions. The men of senior regiments would wear, in addition to their other headdress, the head-ring (isicoco) denoting their married state. A gradation of shield colour was found, junior regiments having largely dark shields the more senior ones having shields with more light colouring; Shaka's personal regiment Fasimba (The Haze) having white shields with only a small patch of darker colour. This shield uniformity was facilitated by the custom of separating the king's cattle into herds based on their coat colours.

Certain adornments were awarded to individual warriors for conspicuous courage in action; these included a type of heavy brass arm-ring (ingxotha) and an intricate necklace composed of interlocking wooden pegs (iziqu).

=== Tactics ===
The buffalo horns formation of the Zulu army. Parts 1–4 above: 1 "enemy", 2 "horns", 3 "chest", 4 "loins"

The Zulu typically took the offensive, deploying in the well known "buffalo horns" formation. The attack layout was composed of four elements, each of which represented a grouping of Zulu regiments:

1. Left horn or flank
2. Right horn or flank
  The "horns" or flanking elements were used to encircle and pin the enemy. Generally the "horns" were made up of younger greener troops and could be maneuvered separately as needed in an operation.
3. The "Chest" or central main force which delivered the coup de grâce. The prime fighters made up the composition of the main force.
4. The "Loins" or reserves used to exploit success or reinforce elsewhere. Often these were older veterans, sometimes positioned with their backs to the battle so as not to get unduly excited.

Encirclement tactics were not unique in the region and attempts to surround an enemy were not unknown even in the ritualised battles. The use of separate manoeuvre elements to support a stronger central group was also known in pre-mechanised tribal warfare, as is the use of reserve echelons farther back. What was unique about the Zulu was the degree of organisation, consistency with which they used these tactics, and the speed at which they executed them. Developments and refinements may have taken place after Shaka's death, as witnessed by the use of larger groupings of regiments by the Zulu against the British in 1879. Missions, available manpower and enemies varied, but whether facing native spear, or European bullet, the impis generally fought in and adhered to the classical buffalo horns pattern.

=== Organisation of the Zulu forces ===
Organization. The Zulu forces were generally grouped into 3 levels: regiments, corps of several regiments, and "armies" or bigger formations, although the Zulu did not use these terms in the modern sense. Size distinctions were taken account of, any grouping of men on a mission could collectively be called an impi, whether a raiding party of 100 or horde of 10,000. Numbers were not uniform, but dependent on a variety of factors including assignments by the king, or the manpower mustered by various clan chiefs or localities. A regiment might be 400 or 4000 men. These were grouped into Corps that took their name from the military kraals where they were mustered, or sometimes the dominant regiment of that locality. While the modest Zulu population could not turn out the hundreds of thousand available to major world or continental powers like France, Britain, or Russia, the Zulu "nation in arms" approach could mobilize substantial forces in local context for short campaigns, and maneuver them in the Western equivalent of divisional strength. The victory won by Zulu king Cetshwayo at Ndondakusuka, for example, two decades before the Anglo-Zulu War of 1879, involved a battlefield deployment of 30,000 troops.

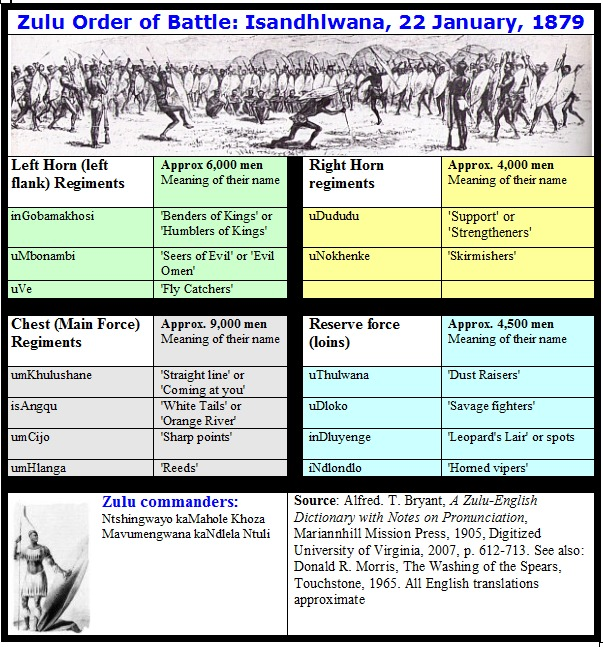
The Zulu order of battle at Isandlwana.

Higher command and unit leadership. An inDuna guided each regiment, and he in turn answered to senior izinduna who controlled the corps grouping. Overall guidance of the host was furnished by elder izinduna usually with many years of experience. One or more of these elder chiefs might accompany a big force on an important mission. Coordination of tactical movements was supplied by the indunas who used hand signals and messengers. Generally before deploying for battle, the regiments were made to squat in a semicircle while these commanders made final assignments and adjustments. Lower level regimental izinduna, like the NCOs of today's armies, and yesterday's Roman centurions, were extremely important to morale and discipline. Prior to the clash at Isandhlwana for example, they imposed order on the frenzied rush of warriors eager to get at the British, and steadied those faltering under withering enemy fire during the battle. The widely spaced maneuvers of an impi sometimes could make control problematic once an attack was unleashed. Indeed, the Zulu attacks on the British strongpoints at Rorke's Drift and at Kambula (both bloody defeats) seemed to have been carried out by over-enthusiastic leaders and warriors despite contrary orders of the Zulu King, Cetshwayo. Such over-confidence or disobedience by thrusting leaders or forces is not unusual in warfare. At the Battle of Trebia for example, the over-confident Roman commander Sempronius was provoked into a hasty attack, that resulted in a defeat for Roman arms. Likewise, General George Custer disobeyed the orders of his superior, General Terry, and rashly launched a disastrous charge against Indian forces at the Battle of the Little Bighorn, resulting in the total destruction of his command. Popular film re-enactments display a grizzled izinduna directing the Zulu host from a promontory with elegant sweeps of the hand, and the reserves still lay within top commanders' overall control. Coordination after an army was set in motion however relied more on the initial pre-positioning and assignments of the regiments before the advance, and the deep understanding by Zulu officers of the general attack plan. These sub-commanders could thus slow down or speed up their approach runs to maintain the general "buffalo horns" alignment to match terrain and situation.

=== Summary of the Shaka reforms ===
As noted above, Shaka was neither the originator of the impi, or the age grade structure, nor the concept of a bigger grouping than the small clan system. His major innovations were to blend these traditional elements in a new way, to systematise the approach to battle, and to standardise organization, methods and weapons, particularly in his adoption of the ilkwa – the Zulu thrusting spear, unique long-term regimental units, and the "buffalo horns" formation. Dingswayo's approach was of a loose federation of allies under his hegemony, combining to fight, each with their own contingents, under their own leaders. Shaka dispensed with this, insisting instead on a standardised organisation and weapons package that swept away and replaced old clan allegiances with loyalty to himself. This uniform approach also encouraged the loyalty and identification of warriors with their own distinctive military regiments. In time, these warriors, from many conquered tribes and clans came to regard themselves as one nation- the Zulu. The so-called Marian reforms of Rome in the military sphere are referenced by some writers as similar. While other ancient powers such as the Carthaginians maintained a patchwork of force types, and the legions retained such phalanx-style holdovers like the triarii, later writers would attribute to Marius the implementation of one consistent standardised approach for all the infantry that likely actually took place gradually across many years. This enabled more disciplined formations and efficient execution of tactics over time against a variety of enemies. As one military historian notes:

Combined with Shaka's "buffalo horns" attack formation for surrounding and annihilating enemy forces, the Zulu combination of iklwa and shield—similar to the Roman legionaries' use of gladius and scutum—was devastating. By the time of Shaka's assassination in 1828, it had made the Zulu kingdom the greatest power in southern Africa and a force to be reckoned with, even against Britain's modern army in 1879.

== In battle ==
To understand the full scope of the impi's performance in battle, military historians of the Zulu typically look to its early operations against internal African enemies, not merely the British interlude. In terms of numbers, the operations of the impi would change—from the Western equivalent of small company and battalion size forces, to manoeuvres in multi-divisional strength of between 10,000 and 40,000 men. The victory won by Zulu king Cetswayo at Ndondakusuka, for example, two decades before the Anglo-Zulu War, involved a deployment of 30,000 troops. These were sizeable formations in regional context but represented the bulk of prime Zulu fighting strength. Few impi-style formations were to routinely achieve this level of mobilisation for a single battle. By comparison, at Cannae, the Romans deployed 80,000 men, and generally could put tens of thousands more into smaller combat actions. The popular notion of countless attacking black spearmen is a distorted one. Manpower supplies on the continent were often limited. In the words of one historian: "The savage hordes of popular lore seldom materialized on African battlefields." This limited resource base would hurt the Zulu when they confronted technologically advanced world powers such as Britain. The advent of new weapons like firearms would also have a profound impact on the African battlefield, but as will be seen, the impi-style forces largely eschewed firearms, or used them in a minor way. Whether facing native spear or European bullet, impis largely fought as they had since the days of Shaka, from Zululand to Zimbabwe, and from Mozambique to Tanzania.

The Zulu had greater numbers than their opponents, but greater numbers massed together in compact arrays simply presented easy targets in the age of modern firearms and artillery. African tribes that fought in smaller guerrilla detachments typically held out against European invaders for a much longer time, as witnessed by the 7-year resistance of the Lobi against the French in West Africa, or the operations of the Berbers in Algeria against the French.

When the Zulu did acquire firearms, most notably captured stocks after the great victory at Isandhlwana, they lacked training and used them ineffectively, consistently firing high to give the bullets "strength." Southern Africa, including the areas near Natal, was teeming with bands like the Griquas who had learned to use guns. Indeed, one such group not only mastered the way of the gun, but became proficient horsemen as well, skills that helped build the Basotho tribe, in what is now the nation of Lesotho. In addition, numerous European renegades or adventurers (both Boer and non-Boer) skilled in firearms were known to the Zulu. Some had even led detachments for the Zulu kings on military missions.

Throughout the 19th century they persisted in "human wave" attacks against well defended European positions where massed firepower devastated their ranks. The ministrations of an isAngoma (plural: izAngoma) Zulu diviner or "witch doctor", and the bravery of individual regiments were ultimately of little use against the volleys of modern rifles, Gatling guns and artillery at the Ineyzane River, Rorke's Drift, Kambula, Gingingdlovu and finally Ulindi.

== In popular culture ==
The term "impi" has become synonymous with the Zulu nation in international popular culture; it appears in various video games such as Civilization III, Civilization IV: Warlords, Civilization: Revolution, Civilization V: Brave New World, and Civilization VI, where the Impi is the unique unit for the Zulu faction with Shaka as their leader. 'Impi' is also the title of a very famous South African song by Johnny Clegg and his band Juluka, which has become something of an unofficial national anthem, especially at major international sports events and especially when the opponent is England.

Lyrics:

Impi! O nans'impi iyeza (Impi! Oh here comes impi)
Uban'obengathint'amabhubesi? (Who would have touched the lions?)

Before stage seven of the 2013 Tour de France, the Orica–GreenEDGE cycling team played 'Impi' on their team bus in honor of teammate Daryl Impey, the first South African Tour de France leader.

== See also ==
- African military systems to 1800
- African military systems after 1900
- Military history of Africa
- Ashanti Empire
- Military of the Ashanti Empire
- Military history of Africa
- Mali Empire
- Military history of the Mali Empire
- Kingdom of Ndongo
- Kingdom of Matamba
- Kingdom of Kongo
- Nzinga of Ndongo and Matamba
- Battle of Mbwila
- Battle of Zama
- Battle of Isandlwana

== Bibliography ==
- Colenso, Frances E. (1880). History of the Zulu War and Its Origin. Assisted by Edward Durnford. London: Chapman & Hall.
- Knight, Ian. Brave Men's Blood, London, 1990. ISBN 1-84415-212-X.
- Knight, Ian (2002). Isandlwana 1879: The Great Zulu Victory. Osprey. ISBN 1-84176-511-2.
- Knight, Ian. The Zulus.
- Knight, Ian. Anatomy of the Zulu Army.
- Morris, Donald R. (1998). The Washing of the Spears. Da Capo Press. ISBN 0-306-80866-8.
