= Mhlangana =

Zulu prince

Mhlangana (died 1828) (also known as Umhlangana ka Senzangakhona) was a Zulu prince - the son of Senzangakhona, a brother of Shaka, and half-brother of Dingane and Mpande. He assisted Dingane and Shaka's induna (advisor) Mbopha in Shaka's assassination at Dukuza in 1828, and was himself assassinated by Dingane shortly afterwards.

== See also ==
- List of Zulu kings
