= KaMalandela =

kaMalandela is a South African Zulu surname. Notable people with the surname include:

- Ntombela kaMalandela (c. 1590–c. 1655), 17th century proto-chieftain of the Zulu nation
- Zulu kaMalandela (1627–1709), founder and chief of the Zulu clan
