= Nandi (mother of Shaka) =

Zulu queen, mother of Shaka

Nandi KaBhebhe
- Born: c. 1760; Melmoth, Zulu Kingdom
- Died: October 10, 1827
- Partners: Senzangakhona kaJama; Gendeyana
- Children: Shaka kaSenzangakhona; Nomcuba kaSenzangakhona; Ngwadi kaGendeyana
- Parents: Bhebhe KaNqeshe (father); Mfunda KaKhondlo KaQwabe (mother)

Nandi kaBhebhe (c. 1760 – October 10, 1827) was a daughter of Bhebhe kaLanga, a past Mhlongo chief of Elangeni and the mother of Shaka kaSenzangakhona, King of the Zulus.

== Birth ==
Queen Nandi kaBhebhe was born in Melmoth in 1760. Her father was a chief of the Mhlongo people of Elangeni.

== Personal life ==
Nandi kaBhebhe was impregnated out of wedlock by Jama kaNdaba's son, Senzangakhona. The Mhlongo people demanded Senzangakhona pay for his non-traditional act. Bhebhe kaLanga approached Jama kaNdaba to settle the matter. Nandi was at the fore-front of this case and discussion. She personally demanded 55 Head of cattle as payment for Lobola(Bride price) and damages. Jama kaNdaba agreed to pay what was demanded by Bhebhe kaLanga so as to avoid war. Senzangakhona and Nandi also had a daughter who followed Shaka, Nomcuba. After her relationship with Senzangakhona deteriorated, she was forced to leave the kraal. Nandi returned to her people, the Mhlongo of Elangeni, leaving Shaka behind. Shaka's life at Senzangakhona's kraal proved dangerous and finally his uncle Mudli brought him and his sister to Nandi at Elangeni. During that time Nandi had to protect her children from famine and assassination attempts. However, Nandi's stay at Elangeni proved dangerous as well, so she left with her children to live amongst the Khondlo(Qwabe)people. There, she met Gendeyana, whom she married and had a son, Ngwadi. Nandi's stay amongst the Qwabe was not pleasant which forced her to leave the Qwabe to live amongst the Mthethwa people led by chief Dingiswayo ka Mohlatsane. Nandi was warmly welcomed by the Mthethwa. She found it a good place to raise her children Shaka, Nomcuba and Ngwadi. Her son Shaka joined a Ibutho regiment led by Bhuza. It was amongst the Mthethwa where Shaka devised his military tactics.

== Death ==
Queen Nandi kaBhebhe died of dysentery on October 10, 1827. Her grave can be found outside Eshowe, off the old Empangeni road. The grave is marked Nandi. On 11 March 2011 the Mhlongo Committee met at Eshowe with the Office of the KZN (kwaZulu-Natal) Premier and Amafa to finalise plans for Princess Nandi's grave near Eshowe. It was agreed that there would be an official opening day in May 2011 to present Queen Nandi kaBhebhe's grave after the approval of the designs suggested by the Mhlongo people. Queen Nandi KaBhebhe was born into the Mhlongo people and for that reason it was also agreed that the name on the grave shall be "Princess Nandi Mhlongo, Mother of King Shaka". The direct descendants of King Shaka's mother Nandi have expressed dissatisfaction with the state of her grave which has lain unattended for over 200 years. The Zulu royal family blames the government for this because according to them, the graves of prominent people are the responsibility of government. Amafa heritage which administers protected structures in the province will soon erect a sculpture symbolic of Nandi's status once the Mhlongo and the royal family have settled their differences.

Despite the hard times they endured together, or perhaps because of them, Shaka loved his mother almost to the point of worship.

According to Donald Morris, Shaka ordered that no crops should be planted during the following year of mourning, no milk (the basis of the Zulu diet at the time) was to be used, and any woman who became pregnant was to be killed along with her husband. At least 7,000 people who were deemed to be insufficiently grief-stricken were executed, although the killing was not restricted to humans: cows were slaughtered so that their calves would know what losing a mother felt like.

What Morris states comes from Henry Francis Fynn's memory. Fynn's account has been disputed with some sources alleging that they were exaggerated since he may have had deeper motives. Fynn's earlier accounts were sometimes inaccurate and exaggerated which would become crucial to the growth of Zulu mythology. Many of the first white settlers were illiterate, with the exception of a few who controlled the written record. These writers have been accused of demonizing Shaka as a figure of inhuman qualities, a symbol of violence and terror, to obscure their own colonial agenda. Julian Cobbing also argues that these settlers' writers were anxious to create a myth which would "cover up" colonial 19th-century slave raiding, rape across the African sub-continent and to justify the seizure of land.
