= Mawa kaJama =

Zulu princess (1770s-1848)

- Born: Mawa kaJama c. 1770s Zulu Kingdom
- Died: 1848 (aged around 75); Colony of Natal
- House: House of Zulu
- Father: Jama kaNdaba

Mawa kaJama (c. 1770s – 1848) was a Zulu princess who was a prominent opponent of her nephew King Mpande. After Mpande began a purge of his opponents in June 1843, Mawa fled with up to 50,000 refugees to the British Colony of Natal, significantly depopulating the southern portion of the Zulu Kingdom. After negotiating a treaty with the British, she established and led a permanent settlement on the Umvoti River.

== Biography ==
Mawa was born in the 1770s in the Zulu Kingdom. A princess in the Zulu royal family, she was the youngest daughter of King Jama. According to oral accounts recorded by James Stuart, Mawa was bald as an adult and had artificial hair stuck to her head with red clay. She lived in the kraal of Izintontela, located on the Mamba River near Ntumeni and later relocated to the future site of Gingindlovu. It is unlikely that Mawa was ever married.

When her nephew Shaka became king in 1816, he appointed her as the royal liaison to the military settlement of Ntonteleni. She held this position until 1840, when King Dingane – Shaka's brother and successor – was overthrown by his brother Mpande. Mawa was an opponent of Mpande's reign, instead supporting his brother Gqugqu's claim to the throne. Fearing a coup from Gqugqu's faction, Mpande had his brother executed in June 1843 and began purging his supporters. Mawa immediately fled with around 2,000 to 3,000 other supporters and crossed the Tugela River into the British Colony of Natal. She was joined by 30,000 to 50,000 refugees, depopulating much of the southern portion of the Zulu Kingdom; according to British colonial official Abraham Josias Cloëté, nearly all kraals as far north as Nseleni had been deserted.

This event is remembered in Zulu oral histories as the "Crossing of Mawa", and is emblematic of the population drift from the Zulu Kingdom into Natal, with historian John Laband writing that "by the mid-1840s the British in Natal ruled over more Zulu-speakers than did Mpande in the Zulu kingdom". Soon after their arrival in Natal, Mawa negotiated a treaty with British colonial authorities, allowing her refugees to establish a permanent settlement along the Umvoti River near Verulam. With Mawa leading it, this settlement "became a point of refuge for those opposed to Mpande".

Along with the refugees, Mawa also brought 3,000 royally-owned cattle to Natal. In 1846, after Mpande requested that Martin West – the lieutenant governor of Natal – return these cattle to the Zulu, West empowered local chiefs to seize the cattle. However, rather than returning the cattle to the Zulu, the chiefs distributed them amongst themselves. Due to their lack of clear ownership, these cattle became known as puzela, which later became a Zulu term for "low, immoral people, having no homes, street-walkers".

Mawa died in Natal in 1848.
