= Ntombela =

Ntombela is a South African name that may refer to

Given name

- Ntombela kaMalandela, 17th-century proto-chieftain of the Zulu nation

Surname

- Alfred Ntombela (born 1972), South African actor
- Sisi Ntombela (born 1957), South African politician
- Sthembiso Ntombela (born 1982), South African football defender
- Nonzwakazi Swartbooi-Ntombela, South African politician
