= AbaQulusi (Zulu) =

The abaQulusi or Qulusi are a zulu tribe from South Africa. They are based in the abaqulusi district, Kwazulu-Natal, that bears their name.

== History ==
=== Origins ===
The aunt of King Shaka, Mkabayi kaJama, created the tribe. When the king sent Mkabayi to ebaQuluseni, near the present Vryheid and Hlobane, she founded the powerful abaQulusi tribe that played a big role in the coming wars.

=== Conflicts where the abaQulusi were involved ===
During the Battle of Hlobane and the Battle of Kambula of the Anglo-Zulu war of 1879, the abaQulusi were commanded by the iNkosi Msebe kaMadaka. During the Battle of Holkrans against the Boers in 1902, the iNkosi Sikhobobho was in command.

== Novels ==
- David Ebsworth, The Kraals of Ulundi, Silverwood Books, 2014
- Philippe Morvan, Les fils du ciel (The Sons of Heaven), Calmann-Lévy, 2021
