= Ndaba kaMageba =

Zulu King

King Ndaba kaMageba
- Reign: c. 1745 – 1763
- Predecessor: Mageba kaGumede
- Successor: Jama kaNdaba
- Born: c. 1667
- Died: 1763 (aged 96) eMakhosini Valley, near Babanango
- Spouse: Sitshi kaNkombana Mbatha
- Issue: Jama kaNdaba, Xoko kaNdaba, Ntopho kaNdaba, Zivalele kaNdaba, Nkwelo kaNdaba, Mbuzo kaNdaba, Mntoko kaNdaba
- Father: Mageba kaGumede
- Mother: okaBayeni
- Occupation: King of the Zulu Kingdom

King Ndaba kaMageba (c. 1667 – 1763), son of Mageba kaGumede, was the King of the Zulu Kingdom. Known as the Great-Grandfather of the eventual founder of the Zulu Empire, King Shaka kaSenzangakhona. He reigned a total of 9 years until his death which he was succeeded by his son, Jama kaNdaba, in 1763.

== Legacy ==
Through his sons, King Ndaba established several prominent royal houses: Xoko kaNdaba founded the Biyela clan; Ntopho kaNdaba established the eMgazini lineage, whose descendants bear the praise name Ntshangase; and Zivalele founded the eGazini house.

Preceded by Mageba kaGumede	Zulu King; 1745–1763	Succeeded by Jama kaNdaba
