= Battle of Holkrans =

Part of the Anglo-Boer War

- Part of Anglo-Boer War
Date	6 May 1902
Location	Holkrans, South Africa 27°35′16″S 30°46′1″E
Result	Zulu victory

Belligerents
Boers	Zulu Kingdom

Commanders and leaders
Veldkornet Jan Potgieter	Sikhobobho

Strength
73	300

Casualties and losses
56 killed	52 killed
- Location within KwaZulu-Natal Battle of Holkrans (South Africa)

The Battle of Holkrans or Holkrantz (6 May 1902) took place at Holkrans, near Vryheid in KwaZulu-Natal, South Africa during the second Anglo-Boer War.

== History ==
To stop the raids operated by the Boers on their cattle and crops as a punishment for helping the British, the leader of the abaQulusi, Sikhobobho, responded by assembling his forces and attacked the commando camp at the foot of Holkrans hill. The Zulus attacked at night, and in a mutual bloodbath, the Boers lost 56 killed and 3 wounded, while the Zulus suffered 52 killed and 48 wounded. This battle was the last victory of the abaQulusi to date.
