= Shaka Memorial =

Monument in KwaZulu-Natal, South Africa

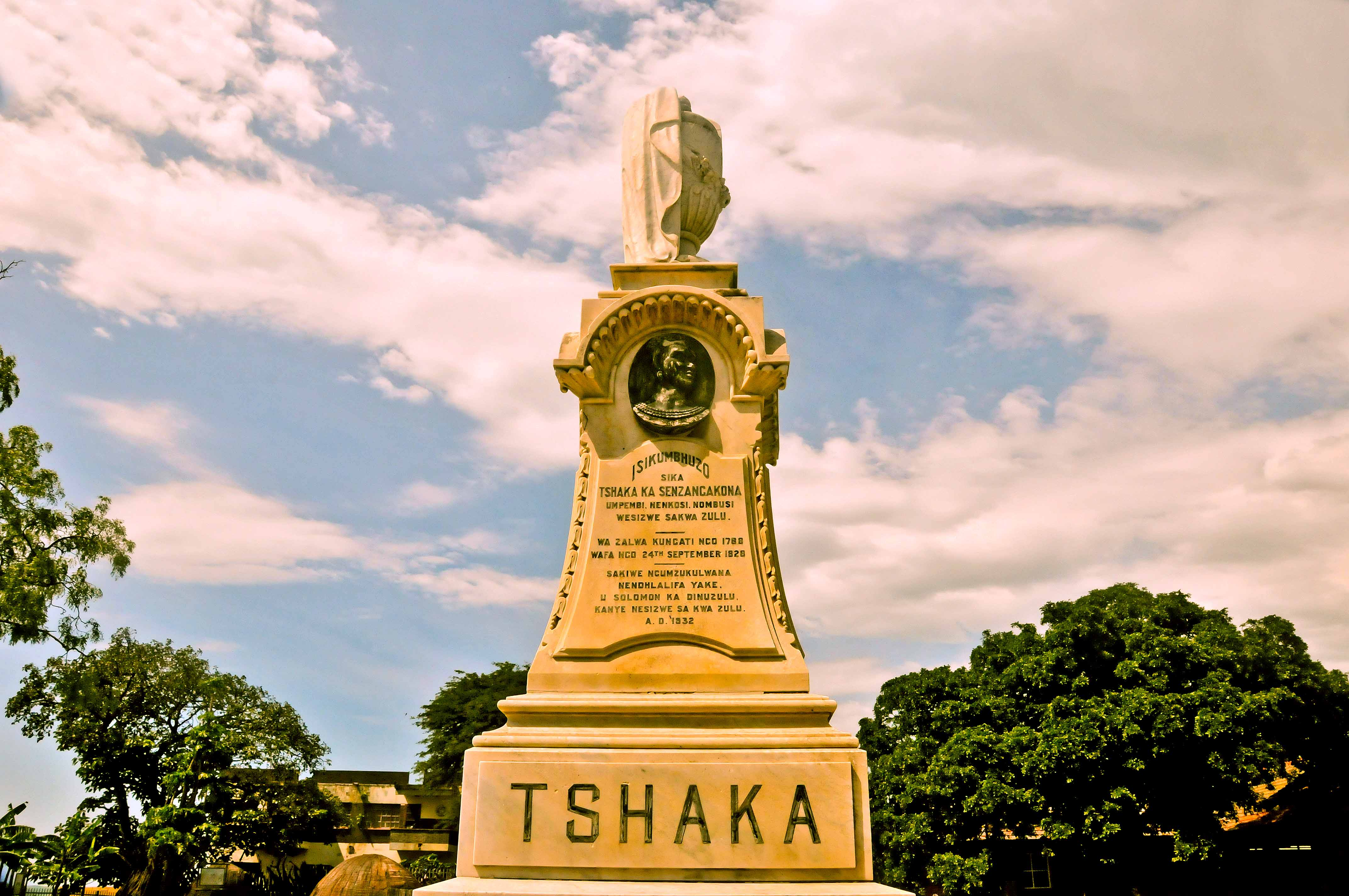
- Memorial stone of King Shaka, founder of the Zulu nation, in Stanger, Kwa-Zulu Natal, South Africa!
- Interactive map of Shaka Memorial
- Location: KwaDukuza/Stanger, KwaZulu-Natal, South Africa
- Coordinates: 29°20′24.19″S 31°17′40.1″E
- Opening date: 1932
- Dedicated to: Shaka

The Shaka Memorial is a provincial heritage site in KwaDukuza in the KwaZulu-Natal province of South Africa. It marks the resting place of the Zulu King Shaka near the site where he was assassinated by his half-brothers Dingane and Mhlangana while sitting on a rock near the barracks at his capital Dukuza.

== Background ==
According to the 1938 Government Gazette, the monument was made in Newcastle, KwaZulu-Natal, and was erected in 1932 on the site of King Shaka's grave.

Adjacent to the memorial is the rock on which King Shaka was alleged to be sitting at the time of his assassination on 24 September 1828. It was rolled across the street from its original site to where it now lies. The date is commemorated by a gathering at the memorial in honour of King Shaka led by the Zulu king, his warriors and dignitaries.
