= Jama kaNdaba =

Chief of the Zulus

Jama
- Born: 1727
- Died: 1781 (aged 53–54)
- Spouse: Mthaniya kaManyelela Sibiya, Sikhumbazane kaManyelela Sibiya
- Issue: Senzangakhona kaJama, Mkabayi kaJama, Phalo kaJama, Nobhongoza kaJama, Mfolozi kaJama, Mamma kaJama, Nokhokhela kaJama
- Father: Ndaba kaMageba
- Mother: Sitshi kaNkombana wakwaMbatha

King Jama kaNdaba (c. 1727–1781), the son of Ndaba kaMageba, was king of the Zulu Kingdom from 1763 to 1781. It is alleged he prophesied the birth of King Shaka. His grandfather was King Mageba kaGumede.

== Biography ==
His name is derived from the Zulu word meaning "he of the stern countenance".

=== Marriage ===
He married, amongst others, Mthaniya KaSibiya, who bore him Senzangakhona, who succeeded him. Senzangakhona was the father of the three Zulu kings, including the greatest, Shaka. He also had a daughter named Mkabayi kaJama. Another daughter was Mawa kaJama.

=== His daughter Mkabayi ===
Mkabayi singlehandedly courted Mthaniya for her father Jama who was aging without having a successor. She did this without her father's knowledge and when he found out he said: "Nenzengakhona", which means "you have done accordingly." Mthaniya's first son was named Senzangakhona – "we have done accordingly", after his sister's efforts to find her father a successor. Mkabayi was a twin and Zulu custom dictated that one of the twins be sacrificed to evade bad luck that would result in the death of one of the parents.

Jama refused to kill one of his girls and broke a known tradition. Consequently, his wife died without bearing him a successor. Mkabayi devoted her whole life in looking after the Zulu Kingdom due to the sacrifice her parents made for her to live.

== Sources ==
Preceded by Ndaba kaMageba	Zulu King; 1763–1781	Succeeded by Senzangakhona kaJama
