= Henry Francis Fynn =

English traveller, trader and diarist (1803–1861)

Henry Francis Fynn (29 March 1803 in Grosvenor Square, London, England – 20 September 1861 in Durban, Colony of Natal) was an English traveler and trader. He was among the first Europeans to make contact with King Shaka. Fynn, Coenraad De Buys, John Dunn and Nathaniel Isaacs were among the most famous of South Africa's so-called White Chiefs.

== Early life ==
Henry Francis Fynn was born in London in 1803. He was the first of five children of Henry and Elizabeth Fynn. His father worked for the East India Company, serving aboard an EIC ship sailing between London and Cape Town, until losing his post in 1806.

By 1807, his father and mother had sold their property in England and had moved to Cape Town. Fynn, however, stayed in London with his aunt, who in 1809 successfully petitioned for his admission to Christ's Hospital. In 1816, Fynn left Christ's and, despite a request from his father that he join his family in the Cape, worked for two years in England as a surgeon's apprentice.

Early English settlers (c. 1820) in Natal

== Life in South Africa ==
Fynn quit being a surgeon's apprentice in 1818 and decided to join his family in Cape Colony. After working several jobs, Fynn ventured to Grahamstown, where he eventually was hired as supercargo aboard Henry Nourse's trading vessel Jane. Late in 1823, Francis George Farewell agreed to include Fynn in a trading venture to the Bay of Natal using the sloop Julia.

By July 1824, Fynn was part of the trading post at Port Natal. During his time at Port Natal, Fynn amassed a group of his own followers, who became known as the iziNikumbi (locusts). He was noted for wearing a blanket and a crownless straw hat after his European clothing had worn out. By 1832, however, he was back in the Cape Colony. He did not return to Natal until 1852, where he worked as a resident magistrate.

== Personal life ==
During his time at Port Natal, Fynn took four African wives, with whom he had twelve children. His great wife was the Zulu princess Mavundlase. She is said to have succeeded to his chieftaincy upon his death. Fynn's son by a junior wife, also named Henry Francis Fynn, attended St. Andrew's College, Grahamstown in 1858 and 1859.

Several years after his return to the Cape, in 1841, he married a European woman, Christina Brown, with whom he had a son, Henry Francis Fynn Junior, in 1846.

Fynn died in Durban in September 1861.

== In popular culture ==
He was played by Robert Powell in the 1986 television drama Shaka Zulu.

== See also ==
- Francis Farewell, leader of the colonists
