= List of Zulu Regiments =

There were a number of Zulu Regiments (known sometimes as "Impis"). Most were created during the reign of Shaka Zulu. This is a list of them.

== List of Regiments ==
Name	Meaning	Date Raised	Age Group Birth Years	
Ama-Wombe	Single Clash	1816	1775-1785	
U-Kangela	Look-out	1816	1785-1790	
Izin-Tenjana	ezakala O-Ngoye (Note: "The Plovers who called out at Ngoye")	1818-1819	1795-1798	
U-Nomdayana		1820	1800	
Ama-Phela	Cockroaches (Note: "The Cockroaches - Adopted from Zwide")	1821	1801	
Ama-Kwenkwe		1822-1826	1802-1806	
Izi-Kwembu		1822-1826	1802-1806	
Izi-Zimazane		1822-1826	1802-1806	
Jubingqwanda	Shorn Head-rings	1816	1785-1790	
U-Dlambedlu	Wild Men	1816	1790-1795	
Um-Gumanqa		1818-1819	1797-1798 (Note: Heavy influx of men due to the collapse of the Mtetwas and Qwabes. These 4 regiments (Um-Gumanqa, Isi-Pezi, U-Mbonambi, U-Nteke) sometimes formed a sub-division.)	Sub-division
Isi-Pezi		1818-1819	1797-1798	Sub-division
U-Mbonambi		1818-1819	1797-1798	Sub-division
U-Nteke		1818-1819	1797-1798	Sub-division
U-Gibabanye or Kipabanye	The Expellers	1820-1825	1800-1805	
U-Fojisa		1820-1825	1800-1805	
Im-Folozi		1820-1825	1800-1805	
In-Dabakulu	The Great Affair	1820-1825	1800-1805	
Fasimba	The Haze "Shaka's Own" (Note: Sometimes Fasimba (The Haze) Shaka's Own was grouped together with Izi-cwe (The Bushmen) Ngomane's Own as the Young Guard)	1816		The Young Guard
Izi-Cwe	The Bushmen "Ngomane's Own"	1816		The Young Guard
U-Dlangezwa		1823-1824		
Um-Ota		1823-1824		
Ulu-Tuli		1823-1824		
Izi-Nyosi	The Bees (Note: Formed by Shaka from the senior u-dibi boys he withdrew from the Soshangane campaign in 1828)	1828		

== Divisions ==
- Belebele Brigade/Division
- Izim-Pohlo (Bachelors) or Isi-Klebe Division

=== Zulu Order of Battle at Isandlwana ===
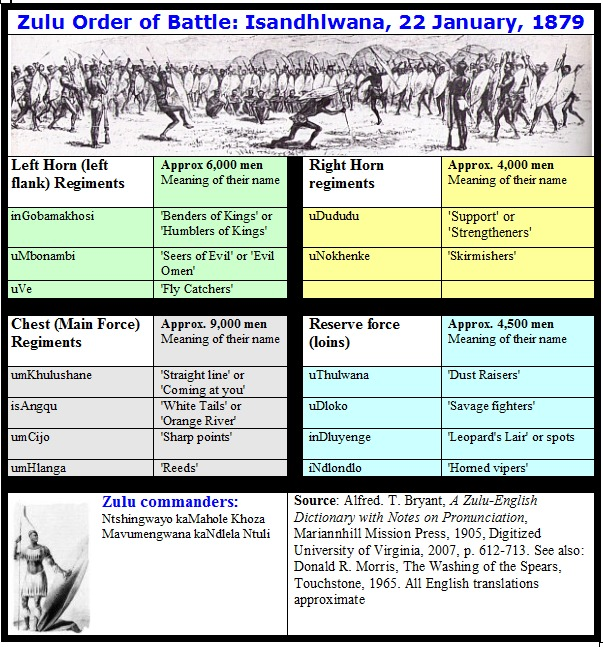
The Zulu deployment at Isandhlwana shows the well-organized tactical system of the impi. The left horn worked with the chest to pin the British down, drawing the bulk of their fire. The right horn meanwhile circled around the mountain to attack the English rear. The reserves struck deeper, cutting off and pursuing fugitives, and eventually attacking Rorke's Drift.

22 January 1879

Left Horn (5,000 to 6,000 men)
Regiment	Meaning
inGobamakhosi	"Benders of Kings" or "Humblers of Kings"
uMbonambi	"Seers of Evil" or "Evil Omen"
uVe	"Fly Catchers"

Right Horn (3,000 to 4,000 men (Note: Frances Colenso on pages 407-13 "records two accounts of Zulu eyewitness participants at the battle. In one account the Zulu army is described as:"... consisting of the Ulundi corps about 3,000 strong, the Nokenke Regiment, 2,000 strong; the Ngobamakosi Regiment, including the Uve, about 5,000 strong: the Umeityu, about 4,000 strong; the Nodengwu, 2,000 strong; the Umbonambi, 3,000 strong; and the Udlhoko, about 1,000 strong, or a total of about 20,000 men in all ..." and in the other account the Zulu army is described as "... eight regiments strong (20,000 to 25,000 men) ... The regiments were Kandampenvu (or Umcityu), Ngobamakosi, Uve, Nokenke, Umbonambi, Udhloko, Nodwengu (name of military kraal of the Inkulutyane Regiment), and Undi (which comprises the Tulwana, Ndhlodho, and Indhluyengwe)."))
Regiment	Meaning
uDududu	"Support" or "Strengtheners"
uNokenke	"Skirmishers"
uNodwengu corps (part)	"Tearers" / or "Those Who Tear"

Chest (Main Force) (7,000 to 9,000 men)
Regiment	Meaning
umKulushane	"Straight Line" or "Coming at you"
isAngqu	"White Tails" or "Orange River"
umCijo	"Sharp Points"
umHlanga	"Reeds"
uKhandampevu	The Beehive
uNodwengu corps (part)	"Tearers" / or "Those Who Tear"

Loins (Reserves) (4,000 to 5,000 men (Note: "played no part in the battle"))
Regiment	Meaning
Undi corps	
uDloko	"Savage Fighters"
iNdluyengwe	"Leopard's Lair" or "spots"
Indlondlo	"Horned Vipers"
Uthulwana	"Dust Raisers"
