= NkosinKulu =

Early Zulu chieftain

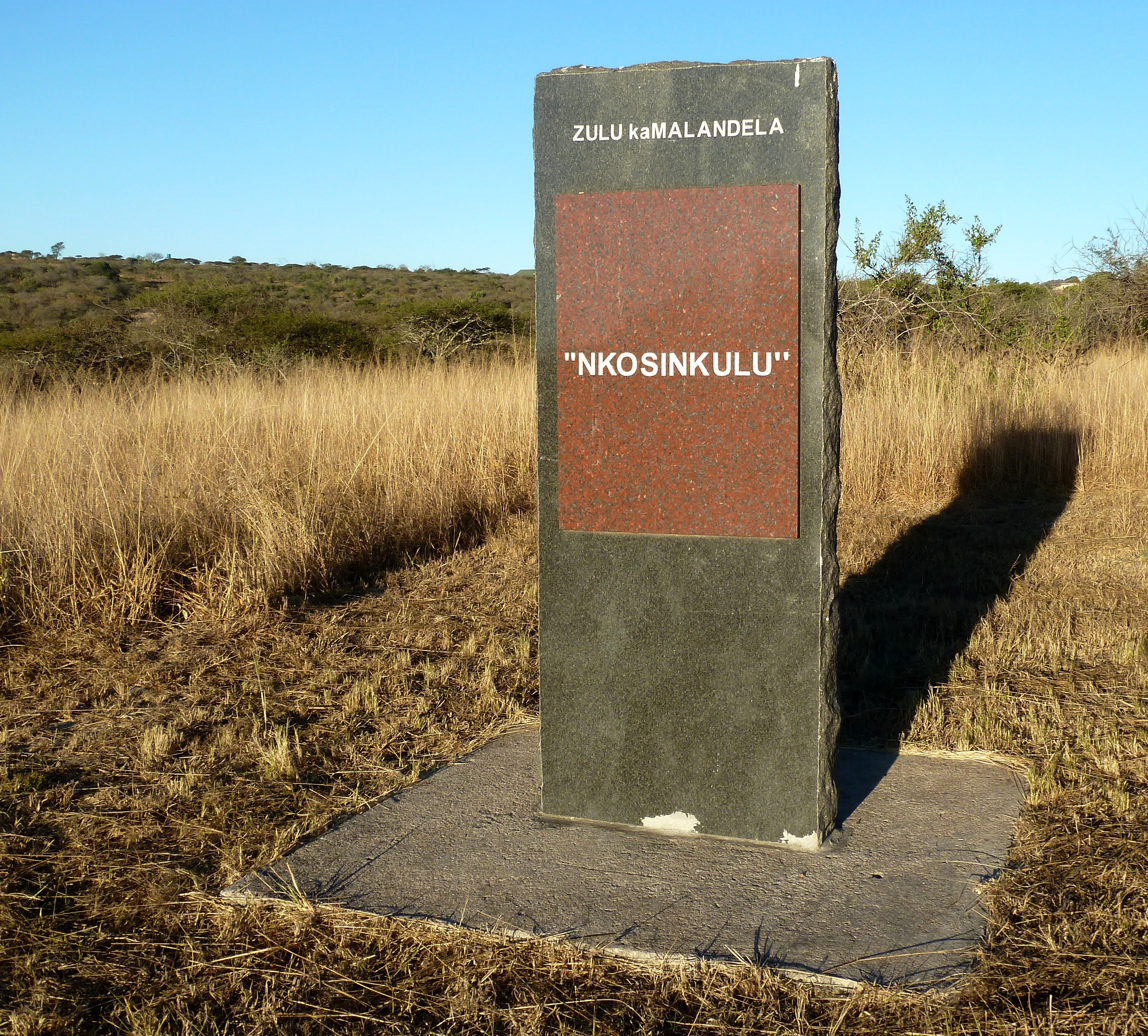
Memorial to the founder of the Zulu nation at uMgungundlovu

NkosinKulu ka Malandela (1627-1709) is considered the progenitor of the Zulu clan and one of the early Zulu chieftains. His headstone is located in uMgungundlovu, in the eMakhosini Valley of Zulu Kings.
