= Bulawayo (Zulu empire) =

Early Zulu capital founded c. 1820

Kwa-Bulawayo (prefixed according to context with 'gu-' or 'kwa-') was the royal kraal of Shaka Zulu, and as such was the capital of the early Zulu Empire. It was founded after Shaka's conquest of the Ndwandwe kingdom, in around 1820. During the conflict, Shaka made a stand outside Kwa-Bulawayo, facing two thousand Ndwande who returned from cattle rustling, in addition to five hundred more who survived the battle at Gqokli.

At Kwa-Bulawayo, Shaka first met European traders, who had come from Port Natal. An account of Shaka's interaction with the whites also cited that the location hosted figures such as John Cane and Charles Rawden Maclean, who asked for the ruler's help and blessing. The kraal is not to be confused with the city in Zimbabwe. It was founded and possibly named after it in the 19th century by Matabele king Lobengula, son of Shaka's former lieutenant Mzilikazi.
