= List of Zulu kings =

King of the Zulus
- Ingonyama yamaZulu; Isilo samaBandla
- Provincial

Incumbent
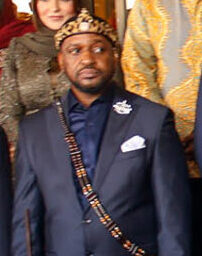
- Misuzulu Sinqobile kaZwelithini since 7 May 2021

Details
- Style: His Majesty
- Heir apparent: Jubezizwe ka Misuzulu
- First monarch: Zulu I kaMalandela
- Residences: Nongoma, KwaZulu-Natal
- Website: zulumonarch.org

This is a list of the monarchs of the Zulu nation, including chieftains and kings of the Zulu royal family from their earliest known history up to the present time.

== Pre-Zulu ==
The Zulu King lineage stretches to as far as Luzumana, who is believed to have lived as long ago as the 16th century. Luzumana is the child of Mnguni, but details about him are unknown.

- NkosinKulu
- Mnguni kaNkosinKulu
- Luzumana kaMnguni
- Malandela kaLuzumana

== Chieftains of the Zulus (c. 1600–1818) ==
When Malandela died, he divided the kingdom into two clans, the Qwabe and the Zulu.

- Zulu I kaMalandela (c. 1627 – c. 1709), founder of the clan
- Nkosinkulu kaZulu I
- Ntombela kaNkosinkulu
- Zulu II kaNtombela
- Gumede kaZulu
- Phunga kaGumede (c. 1657 – c. 1727)
- Mageba kaGumede (c. 1667 – c. 1745), son of Gumede, chief c. 1727 to c. 1745
- Ndaba kaMageba, son of Mageba, chief c. 1745 to 1763
- Jama kaNdaba (c. 1727–1781), son of Ndaba, chief 1763 to 1781
  - Mkabayi kaJama (c. 1750 – 1843), daughter of Jama, regent 1781 to 1787 (until Senzangakhona came of age)
- Senzangakhona kaJama (c. 1762–1816), son of Jama, chief 1787 to 1816
- Sigujana kaSenzangakhona, son of Senzangakhona, chief c. 1816
- Shaka kaSenzangakhona (1787–1828), son of Senzangakhona, chief c. 1816 to 1828

== Kings of the Zulus (c. 1818–present) ==
After Dingiswayo's death at the hands of Zwide, king of the Ndwandwe, around 1818, Shaka assumed leadership of the remnants of the Mthethwa Paramountcy, thereby becoming king.

Zulu Kingdom (Independent, 1816–1879)

Name	Lifespan	Reign start	Reign end	Notes	Family	Image
Shaka kaSenzangakhona	c. July 1787 – 22 September 1828 (aged 41)	1816	22 September 1828	Half-brother of Sigujana kaSenzangakhona	Zulu	Shaka kaSenzangakhona of Zulu Kingdom
Dingane kaSenzangakhona	c. 1795 – 29 January 1840 (aged 44–45)	November 1828	29 January 1840	Half-brother of Shaka kaSenzangakhona	Zulu	Dingane kaSenzangakhona of Zulu Kingdom
Mpande kaSenzangakhona	c. 1798 – 18 October 1872 (aged 73–74)	10 February 1840	18 October 1872	Half-brother of Dingane kaSenzangakhona	Zulu	Mpande kaSenzangakhona of Zulu Kingdom
Cetshwayo kaMpande (1st reign)	1834 – 8 February 1884 (aged 49–50)	18 October 1872	28 August 1879	Son of Mpande kaSenzangakhona	Zulu	Cetshwayo kaMpande of Zulu Kingdom

Zululand (Dependency, 1883–present)

Name	Lifespan	Reign start	Reign end	Notes	Family	Image
Cetshwayo kaMpande (2nd reign)	1834 – 8 February 1884 (aged 49–50)	29 January 1883	8 February 1884	Son of Mpande kaSenzangakhona	Zulu	Cetshwayo kaMpande of Zululand
Dinuzulu KaCetshwayo	c. 1868 – 18 October 1913 (aged 44–45)	21 May 1884	18 October 1913	Son of Cetshwayo kaMpande	Zulu	Dinuzulu kaCetshwayo of Zululand
Solomon kaDinuzulu	1891 – 4 March 1933 (aged 41–42)	1 November 1913	4 March 1933	Son of Dinuzulu kaCetshwayo	Zulu	Solomon kaDinuzulu of Zululand
Cyprian Bhekuzulu kaSolomon	4 August 1924 – 17 September 1968 (aged 44)	27 August 1948	17 September 1968	Son of Solomon kaDinuzulu	Zulu	Cyprian Bhekuzulu kaSolomon of Zululand
Goodwill Zwelithini kaBhekuzulu	27 July 1948 – 12 March 2021 (aged 72)	17 September 1968	12 March 2021	Son of Cyprian Bhekuzulu kaSolomon	Zulu	Goodwill Zwelithini kaBhekuzulu of Zululand
Misuzulu Sinqobile kaZwelithini	23 September 1974 (age 52)	7 May 2021	Incumbent	Son of Goodwill Zwelithini kaBhekuzulu	Zulu	Misuzulu Sinqobile kaZwelithini of Zululand

== See also ==
- Zulu Kingdom
