= Age grade =

Sociological and anthropological concept

In sociology and anthropology, an age grade or age class is a form of social organization based on age, within a series of such categories, through which individuals pass over the course of their lives.

This is in contrast to an age set, to which individuals remain permanently attached as the set itself becomes progressively more senior.

The number of age classes, the determining ages and the terminology vary significantly between traditions. Even within a single society, a person may belong to several overlapping grades in different spheres of life, e.g. per year a different school class and yet for several years on end a child, then an adolescent, finally an adult.

In tribal societies entry into an age grade – generally gender-separated – is often marked by an initiation rite, which may be the crowning of a long and complex preparation, sometimes in retreat. After a period of some years, during which they often perform certain common activities, alone or under senior guidance, members may be initiated either collectively or individually into a more senior age grade. This progression is often accompanied by the revelation of secret knowledge. In most cultures, age grade systems, as with age sets, are the preserve of men, and it is the older men who control a society's secret knowledge, collectively or restricted to a council of elders and/or specific positions such as shaman entrusted with the preparation of initiants.

Closely related age-grade systems are common among East African Cushitic communities. Particularly, the Oromo, a trans-national nation living in Ethiopia and Kenya, have a well-developed age-grade system known as the Gadaa System. [Another example is that of the Maasai] Gadaa through history came to organize social life around the series of five generation grades which assign obligations as well as rights to members of the society. Through Gadaa, many socio-political functions were carried out. For example, the system operated as an educational institution by providing periods of training and skill development in each grade and by casting all those YUBA (who had finished the full cycle consisting of five-grades) in the role of teachers and advisors. The system operated as a judicial institution by assigning a Chief Justice, jurors at the national level and making all LUBA wherever they were into arbitrators and councilors ready to defend the national law.

Many male age grade systems are associated with patrilineal kinship systems. Male age grade systems associated with matrilineal kinship systems are found among the Austronesian populations of Taiwan.

== See also ==
- Cohort (statistics)
- Timber metrics
- Age stratification
- Ageism
