= Mpande kaSenzangakhona =

Ruler of the Zulu Kingdom from 1840 to 1872

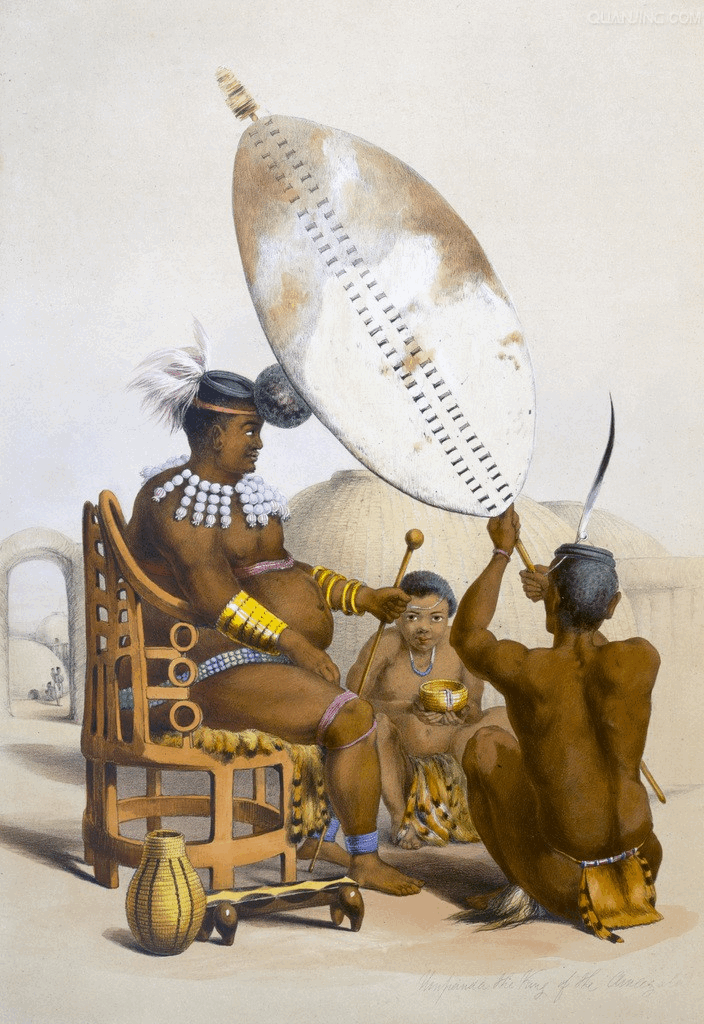
- An 1849 portrait of King Mpande by George French Angas

King of Zulu Kingdom
- Reign: 1840–1872
- Coronation: 1840
- Predecessor: Dingane kaSenzangakhona
- Successor: Cetshwayo kaMpande
- Born: c. 1798
- Died: 18 October 1872 (aged 73–74); Zululand
- Burial: Nodwengu; 28°17′54″S 31°25′34″E
- Spouse: 26 including: Ngqumbazi kaMbondi Zungu; Monase kaMntungwa Nxumalo; Sanguza Gumede; Nomantshili kaSigulana Xulu; Nozibuko kaSothondose Nxumalo; Nobelungu kaDingiswayo Mthethwa; Masala; Dabeka kaSonamuzi Ngema; Mkana; Ndingindi; Sifoko; Mlanjana; Noziningo; okaLufico; okaLugaju; Nomtobo kaSomangqepu; Mncangce kaTshandu; Simunu; Tengase kaMkowe; Noziboto; Nomampondo; okaMkanyile; Mahlayisa kaZikwezile; Nomfula kaJojo; Vungana kaQoza; Mahlayisa kaMcombo
- Issue: 48 including : Cetshwayo kaMpande; Silwane kaMpande; Ndabuko kaMpande; Mlamjwane kaMpande; Mbuyazi kaMpande; Mantantashiya kaMpande; Mkhungu kaMpande; Batonyile kaMpande; Nokwenda kaMpande; Mdumba kaMpande; Sancinza kaMpande; Dabulamanzi kaMpande; Mpoyiyana kaMpande; Mthonga kaMpande; Mgidlana kaMpande; Hamu kaMpande; Magwendu kaMpande; Sikhotha kaMpande; Tshonkweni kaMpande; Somklwana kaMpande; Budu kaMpande; Ziwedu kaMpande; Mbikose kaMpande; Siteku kaMpande; Shingana kaMpande; Sigayigayi kaMpande; Dabulesinye kaMpande; Tolo kaMpande; Mlondo kaMpande; Popoza kaMpande; Ngatsha kaMpande; Mahanana kaMpande; Batabile kaMpande; Mgidlana kaMpande; Sukani kaMpande; Mgxutsheni 'Nokenke' kaMpande; Ntonjana kaMpande; Ntutwane kaMpande; Hlayisiye kaMpande; Ngcobengcobe kaMpande; Nomanxiwa kaMpande; Ziwelile kaMpande; Nqumile kaMpande; Vukaphi kaMpande; Ndindela kaMpande; Bekiwe kaMpande; Nomabunu kaMpande; Mtabayi kaMpande
- Father: Senzangakhona kaJama
- Mother: Songiya kaNgotsha Hlabisa

Mpande kaSenzangakhona (c. 1798 – 18 October 1872) was the monarch of the Zulu Kingdom from 1840 to 1872. He was a half-brother of Sigujana, Shaka and Dingane, who preceded him as Zulu kings. He came to power after he had overthrown Dingane in 1840.

His reign was relatively lengthy at 32 years, but for the latter part of his reign, he was king in name only. His son Cetshwayo became de facto ruler in 1856. Mpande himself claimed that he preferred a quiet life and that he had been forced to become king.

== Biography ==
=== Early career ===
Mpande was born in Babanango, Zululand, the son of Senzangakhona kaJama (1762–1816) and his ninth wife Songiya kaNgotsha Hlabisa. He was considered a weak man in comparison to his contemporaries. While other half-brothers were eliminated when his brother Dingane assassinated Shaka to become king in 1828, he was allowed to live. Mpande apparently showed no interest in Zulu power politics.

Mpande came to prominence when Dingane suffered a catastrophic disaster at the Battle of Blood River in December 1838. His defeat at the hands of the Boers led to unrest, which Dingane attempted to control by eliminating potential successors such as Mpande. In September 1839 Mpande defied his brother, who demanded his support in a war against the Swazi people. Fearing he would be killed if he joined Dingane, Mpande instead led thousands of Zulus into the Boer republic of Natalia. The Boers led by Andries Pretorius and Gert Rudolph decided to support Mpande, hoping to gain concessions if he could oust Dingane. In January 1840 Mpande's army led by Nongalaza defeated Dingane at the Battle of Maqongqo. Mpande arrived shortly after with Pretorius' force of Boers, and was proclaimed king.

After executing his own general Ndlela kaSompisi, Dingane escaped, but was soon murdered in Hlatikhulu Forest. Mpande was now unopposed as king. Mpande later claimed that he had been forced to become king against his own wishes. The Boers immediately were granted claim to a large stretch of territory in exchange for their help.

=== Early reign ===
In October 1843 British commissioner Henry Cloete negotiated a treaty to define the borders of Natal and Zululand. Mpande also negotiated with the Boers, ceding land around the Klip River in 1847, which the British considered a violation of the treaty. Mpande had to reoccupy the land with his own troops. Mpande managed to avoid further disputes with the British but continued to grant favours to the Boers.

In 1843 Mpande ordered the death of his brother Gqugqu, who was said to be plotting to kill the king. Gqugqu's wives and children were also killed. The massacre produced a large influx of refugees into Natal led by his aunt Mawa kaJama; according to British colonial official Abraham Josias Cloëté, nearly all kraals as far north as Nseleni had been deserted.

Mpande adopted an expansionist policy in the early 1850s, initially raiding the areas surrounding the Zulu kingdom. These moves culminated in the invasion of Swaziland in 1852. The Swazi were under Zulu suzerainty, but maintained effective independence under Mswati II. According to historian Philip Bonner, Mpande wanted Swaziland to be under his control because of fears of Boer expansion from Natal. He "was intent on turning Swaziland into a physical sanctuary should he become embroiled with Natal, and was not prepared to settle for anything less than effective control". The Zulu invasion was a success to the extent that the Swazi were faced with the prospect of "disintegration and collapse". During the invasion, Mpande's eldest son Cetshwayo proved his capacities as a leader. However, the British pressured him into withdrawing, which he did quickly.

=== Succession conflicts ===
Cetshwayo's success as a leader led to a conflict with Mpande's second, and favourite, son Mbuyazi. Though Cetshwayo was the oldest, he was not officially the successor, as his mother had not been declared the king's Great Wife. Either brother could inherit if Mpande chose their mother as his Great Wife, which he did not. Cetshwayo felt that his father was favouring Mbuyazi, and both sides developed factions of followers. Mpande ceded territory to Mbuyazi on the Tugela River, where he and his followers settled. Mbuyazi also cultivated support from European settlers led by John Dunn. Cetshwayo, who was supported by most of the territorial sub-chiefs, decided to settle the matter militarily. He invaded Mbuyazi's lands and crushed his followers at the Battle of Ndondakusuka, massacring survivors, including five of his brothers. Dunn escaped and later became an adviser to Cetshwayo.

After this Cetshwayo became the de facto ruler, though his father continued to carry out ceremonial functions. Cetshwayo continued his father's policy of maintaining links with both the British and the Boers and balancing out concessions. Cetshwayo also kept an eye on his father's new wives and children for potential rivals, ordering the death of his favourite wife Nomantshali and her children in 1861. Nomantshali and her daughters were hacked to death. Though two sons escaped, the youngest was murdered in front of the king.

According to Gibson, "in his later days he became so fat he was unable to walk". The exact date of his death in late 1872 is unclear, as it was kept secret to secure a smooth transition of power to Cetshwayo.

== Assessment ==
Mpande's apparent passivity has been interpreted in different ways. He has often been identified as a "simpleton" or "the fool of the family", in the words of J Y Gibson. James O. Gump, however, describes him as a "savvy survivor in the Machiavellian world of Zulu politics". Gibson himself says that in his youth he was an imposing figure, quoting a French witness who said he had a regal bearing such that "a Parisian might believe that Umpande, in his youth, had frequented the palaces of kings". However, there is considerable evidence of his "lethargy and indifference" to ruling, even in his early years, when many of the decisions were made by his sons.

Mpande had a positive reputation among Christian missionaries. He allowed John Colenso to codify Zulu grammar and produce Zulu translations of the Bible. Colenso's associate, Zulu convert Magema Fuze, gave a Biblically inspired account of the history of the Zulus in his book The Black People and Whence they Came. In this account God punishes wicked rulers like Shaka and Dingane, but the Zulus flourish under "Mpande's peaceful, enlightened rule." Cetshwayo was cursed because of his impious murder of Nomantshali.

H. Rider Haggard's Allan Quatermain novel Child of Storm is set during the power struggle between Cetshwayo and Mbuyazi. Mpande (called "Panda") is depicted as an indulgent, passive figure.

== See also ==
- Battle of Blood River

Regnal titles
Preceded by Dingane	King of the Zulu Nation; 1840–1872	Succeeded by Cetshwayo
