= Mageba kaGumede =

Zulu king (c. 1667 – c. 1745)

King Mageba kaGumede (c. 1667 – c. 1745) was an early king of the Zulu Kingdom.

Mageba is said to have succeeded his twin brother King Phunga as leader of the Zulu clan on Phunga's death in about 1727. (This succession between close brothers is reflected by references in Zulu praise poetry such as Zulu ka Phunga no Mageba! (Zulus, children of Phunga and Mageba!) Mageba had at least two sons: Ndaba, who succeeded him, and Mpangazitha. Mpangazitha married his cousin, and it is from this marriage that the Mbatha clan as well as the Mageza clan descends.

== In popular culture ==
Mageba is mentioned in the 1981 Juluka song "Impi" about the decisive Battle of Isandlwana against British colonial forces.

Preceded by Phunga kaGumede	Zulu King c. 1727 – c. 1745	Succeeded by Ndaba kaMageba
