= Julian Cobbing =

English historian and professor

- Born: Julian Raymond Dennis Cobbing; June 1944 (age 81–82); London, England
- Occupation: English historian
- Known for: research on 19th century Zulu culture, especially Mfecane

Academic background
- Education: University of London; Lancaster University

Academic work
- Discipline: history
- Notable works: The Mfecane as Alibi: Thoughts on Dithakong and Mbolompo

Julian Raymond Dennis Cobbing (born June 1944, London) is an English historian, and former professor of History at Rhodes University (Grahamstown, South Africa), known best for his controversial and groundbreaking research into Zulu culture of the early 19th century.

Cobbing gained a BA from the University of London and a PhD from Lancaster University. He is regarded as the first historian to attempt to discredit conventional historical beliefs about the 'Mfecane' - a period of wars during the 1820s and 1830s that resulted in the emergence of the Zulu Kingdom. In a paper published in the Journal of African History in 1988, Cobbing argued that the Mfecane had been the construct of Apartheid politicians and historians attempting to justify the longstanding oppression of black South Africans by the white minority. Instead of an internally induced process of black-on-black destruction, Cobbing argued that much of the violence had been brought about by European slave traders and settlers, who had contracted local tribal leaders to capture slaves for sale at Delagoa Bay (now Maputo). The rise of the Zulu state, under Cobbing's hypothesis, was thus more of a defensive reaction to the slave-trading activities of other tribes in the region, rather than a process of active internal aggression, as argued by some contemporary scholars.

Cobbing's hypothesis was highly controversial when first published. Several books and articles have been written focused on rebutting Cobbing's arguments – a prominent example being Roger B. Beck's Slavery in South Africa: Captive Labor on the Dutch Frontier, which featured a collection of articles challenging Cobbing's contentions. Often now referred to as the "Cobbing controversy", historians are still very much divided on the issue of the emergence of the Zulu nation and the accuracy of conventional accounts of the Mfecane.

Cobbing spent two months as a visiting fellow at the University of Oxford in 2002. He currently lives in Grahamstown, South Africa, and recently retired from lecturing in history at Rhodes University, where his course "The Origins of the Modern World Crisis" was very popular. Cobbing's current work focuses on a variety of subjects including the history of Homo sapiens as a species and the modern world crisis.

== Notable academic publications ==
- Julian Cobbing. "The Mfecane as Alibi: Thoughts on Dithakong and Mbolompo". Journal of African History, 29, 1988.

== See also ==
- Mfecane
