= Ntombela kaMalandela =

Zulu proto-chieftain

- Born: c. 1590
- Died: c. 1655 (around age 65)
- Occupation: Zulu proto-chieftain
- Father: Malandela kaLuzumana
- Relatives: Zulu kaMalandela (younger brother)

Ntombela kaMalandela (c. 1590-c. 1655) the son of Malandela kaLuzumana, was the proto-chieftain of the Zulu nation in the late 17th century. He was succeeded by his younger brother Zulu kaMalandela.
