= Sigujana =

King of the Zulu in 1816

Sigujana kaSenzangakhona (died 1816) was King of the Zulu people in 1816. He was the son of Senzangakhona kaJama and half-brother of Dingane kaSenzangakhona and Shaka kaSenzangakhona. He succeeded his father c. 1816. His mother was Bhibhi kaSompisi. Shortly after he became chief, he was murdered by his half-brother, Shaka. It is disputed whether Shaka had him assassinated, or Shaka himself killed Sigujana by stabbing him. His birth date is unknown, but he died in 1816, shortly after he had become King.

Preceded by Senzangakhona kaJama	Zulu King; 1816	Succeeded by Shaka
