= Shaka =

Zulu king from 1816 to 1828

King Shaka
- ISilo Samabandla Onke
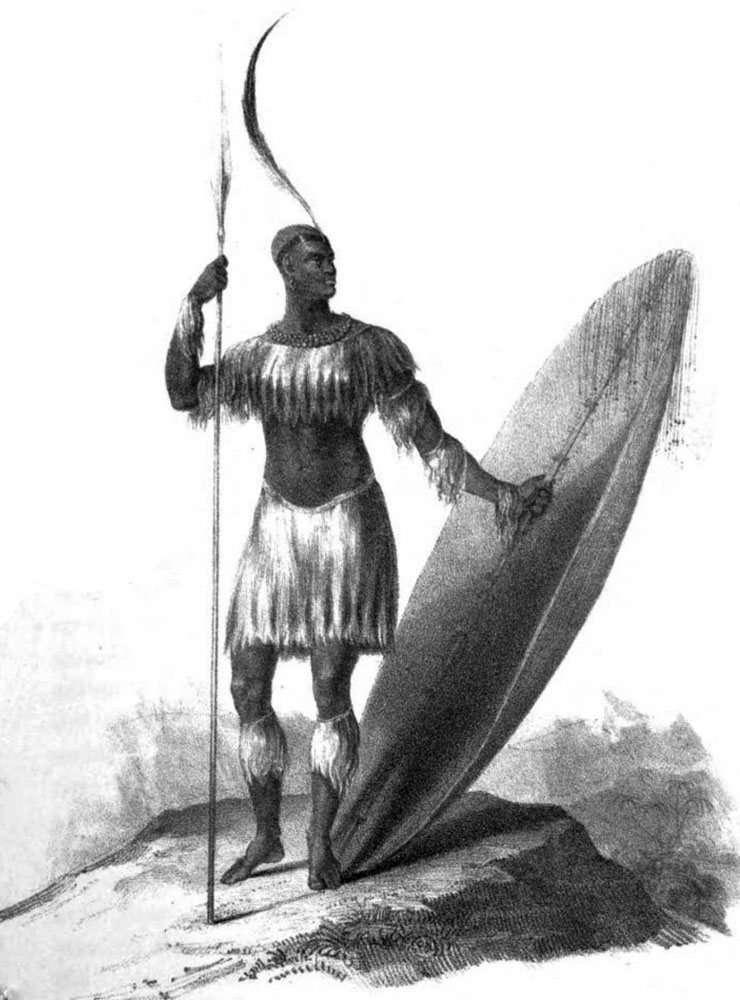
- 1824 European artist's impression of Shaka with a long throwing assegai and heavy shield. No drawings from life are known.

King of the Zulus
- Reign: 1816–1828
- Predecessor: Senzangakhona kaJama
- Successor: Dingane kaSenzangakhona
- Born: c. July 1787; Mthethwa Paramountcy (today near Melmoth, KwaZulu-Natal, South Africa)
- Died: 24 September 1828 (age 41); KwaDukuza, Kingdom of Zulu
- Cause of death: Assassination (fratricide)
- Burial: KwaDukuza
Names
- Sigidi Shaka Mlilwana kaSenzangakhona
Regnal name
- iLembe
- House: House of Zulu
- Father: Senzangakhona kaJama
- Mother: Nandi
- Religion: Zulu religion

Shaka kaSenzangakhona (c. 1787 – 24 September 1828), also known as Shaka Zulu (Zulu pronunciation: [ˈʃaːɠa]), Shaka the Zulu, and Sigidi kaSenzangakhona, was the king of the Zulu Kingdom from 1816 to 1828. One of the most influential monarchs of the Zulu, he ordered wide-reaching reforms that reorganized the military into a formidable force.

King Shaka was born in the lunar month of uNtulikazi (July) in 1787, in Mthonjaneni, KwaZulu-Natal Province, South Africa. The son of the Zulu King Senzangakhona kaJama, he was spurned as an illegitimate son. Shaka spent part of his childhood in his mother's settlements, where he was initiated into an ibutho lempi (fighting unit/regiment), serving as a warrior under Inkosi Dingiswayo.

King Shaka refined the ibutho military system with the Mthethwa Paramountcy's support over the next several years. He forged alliances with his smaller neighbours to counter Ndwandwe raids from the north. The initial Zulu maneuvers were primarily defensive, as King Shaka preferred to apply pressure diplomatically, with an occasional strategic assassination. His reforms of local society built on existing structures. Although he preferred social and propagandistic political methods, he also engaged in several battles.

King Shaka's reign coincided with the start of the Mfecane/Difaqane ("upheaval" or "crushing"), a period of devastating warfare and chaos in southern Africa between 1815 and 1840 that depopulated the region. His role in the Mfecane/Difaqane is controversial. In 1828, he was assassinated by his half-brothers, King Dingane and Prince Mhlangana and Mbopha kaSithayi.

== Early life ==
Shaka (roughly translated as "intestinal beetle") was born to the reigning Zulu king. He was the eldest of many sons, but was considered to be a bastard child and was sent away to live with his mother's tribe, known as the Elangeni, leaving his half-brother to rule the Zulu Kingdom. At the time, the Zulu were a regional tribe relying on pastoral livestock, sorghum, and milk. When Shaka reached a suitable age, he and his mother were sent to the Mthethwa clan, the most powerful regional tribe. There, he matured, and served as a warrior under Jobe, and then for Dingiswayo, a respected warrior and chief of the clan. When Inkosi Dingiswayo discovered Shaka was royalty, he put him in charge of a regiment, helping to develop Shaka's military tactics and strategy.

After Inkosi Zwide, the king of the Ndwandwe (Nxumalo) nation, murdered Dingiswayo, Shaka sought to avenge his death. During that encounter, Zwide's mother, Ntombazi, a sangoma, was killed by Shaka. Shaka chose a particularly gruesome revenge on her by locking her in a house with jackals or hyenas inside. They devoured her, and in the morning, Shaka burned the house to the ground. Shaka continued his pursuit of Zwide. It was not until around 1825 that the two military leaders met in the vicinity of Pongola, near the present-day border of Mpumalanga, a province of South Africa. Shaka was victorious in battle, although his forces sustained heavy casualties, including his military commander, Mgobhozi Ovela Entabeni.

Already at this time, Shaka had grown famous for his use of the short stabbing spear. This spear was referred to as the "iklwa," see: assegai. It was deadly and easy to thrust, whereas before, tribesmen barely tried to customize or improve their weapons. Shaka's innovative tactics, among them the "bull horn", devastated Zwide's forces at the battle of Gqokli Hill.

In his initial years, Shaka had neither the influence nor reputation to compel any but the smallest of groups to join him, and upon Dingiswayo's death, he moved southwards across the Thukela River, establishing his capital, Bulawayo, in Qwabe territory. In Qwabe, Shaka may have intervened in an existing succession dispute to help his own choice, Nqetho, into power.

== Expansion of power and conflict with Zwide ==
This map illustrates the rise of the Zulu Empire under Shaka (1816–1828) in present-day South Africa. The rise of the Zulu Empire under Shaka forced other chiefdoms and clans to flee across a wide area of southern Africa. Clans fleeing the Zulu war zone included the Soshangane, Zwangendaba, Ndebele, Hlubi, Ngwane, Bhaca, Zotsho and Mfengu. A number of tribes fled to the lands of King Faku of the amaMpondo kingdom, King Ngubengcuka of abaThembu kingdom and King Hintsa of the amaXhosa kingdom. They were assimilated into the amaMpondo, abaThembu and amaXhosa cultural ways of life and lived under the protection of the Mpondos, Thembu and Xhosas .

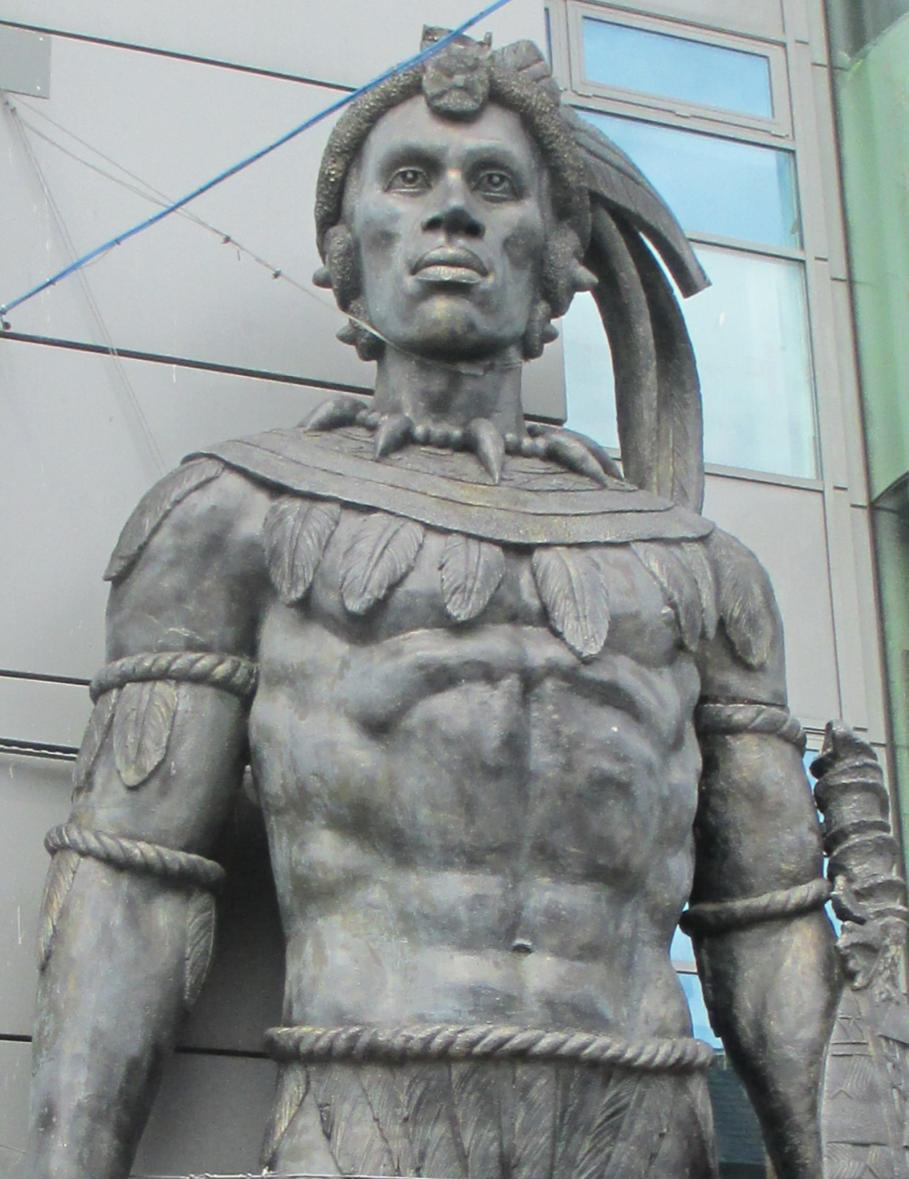
Large statue representing Shaka (rather obviously based on actor Henry Cele) at the Camden markets in London, England.

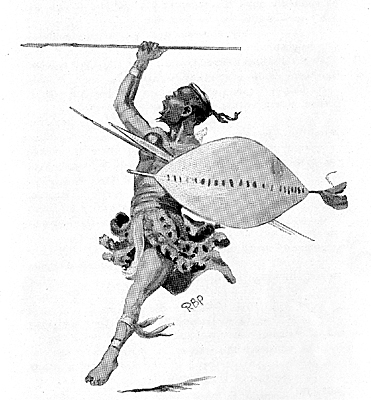
A sketch of a Zulu warrior, drawn in 1913.

Shaka expanded the Zulu Kingdom through war and diplomacy.

As Shaka became more respected by his people, he was able to spread his ideas with greater ease. Using his background as a soldier, Shaka taught the Zulus that the most effective way of gaining power quickly was by conquering and controlling other tribes. His teachings greatly influenced the social outlook of the Zulus. The Zulu tribe soon developed a warrior outlook, which Shaka used to his advantage.

Shaka's hegemony was primarily based on military might, smashing rivals and incorporating scattered remnants into his own army. He supplemented this with a mixture of diplomacy and patronage, incorporating friendly chieftains, including Zihlandlo of the Mkhize, Jobe of the Sithole, and Mathubane of the Thuli. These people were never defeated in battle by the Zulus; they did not have to be. Shaka won them over with subtler tactics, such as patronage and reward. As for the ruling of Qwabe, they began re-inventing their genealogies to give the impression that Qwabe and Zulu were closely related (i.e. as Nguni) in the past. In this way, a greater sense of cohesion was created, though it never became complete, as subsequent civil wars attest.

Shaka still recognised Dingiswayo and his larger Mthethwa clan, as overlord after he returned to the Zulu land but, some years later, Dingiswayo was ambushed by Zwide's Ndwandwe and killed. There is no evidence to suggest that Shaka betrayed Dingiswayo. The Zulu people had to retreat before several Ndwandwe incursions; the Ndwandwe was clearly the most aggressive grouping in the sub-region.

Shaka was able to form an alliance with the leaders of the Mthethwa peoples and was able to establish himself amongst the Qwabe, after Phakathwayo was overthrown with relative ease. With Qwabe, Hlubi and Mkhize support, Shaka was finally able to summon a force capable of resisting the Ndwandwe (of the Nxumalo clan). Shaka's first major battle against Zwide, of the Ndwandwe, was the Battle of Gqokli Hill, on the Mfolozi River. Shaka's troops maintained a strong position on the crest of the hill. A frontal assault by their opponents failed to dislodge them, and Shaka sealed the victory by sending his reserve forces in a sweep around the hill to attack the enemy's rear. Losses were high overall but the efficiency of the new Shakan innovations was proven. It is probable that, over time, the Zulus were able to hone and improve their encirclement tactics.

Another decisive battle eventually took place on the Mhlatuze River, at the confluence with the Mvuzane stream. In the two-day running battle, the Zulus inflicted a resounding defeat on their opponents. Shaka then led a fresh reserve some 110 kilometres (70 mi) to the royal kraal of Zwide, ruler of the Ndwandwe, and destroyed it. Zwide himself escaped with a handful of followers before falling afoul of a chieftain named Mjanji, ruler of a Babelu clan. (He died in mysterious circumstances soon afterwards.) Zwide's general, Soshangane (of the Shangaan), moved north towards what is now Mozambique to inflict further damage on less resistant foes and take advantage of slaving opportunities, obliging Portuguese traders to pay tribute. Shaka later had to contend again with Zwide's son, Sikhunyane, in 1826.

Shaka granted permission to Europeans to enter Zulu territory on rare occasions. In the mid-1820s, Henry Francis Fynn provided medical treatment to the king after an assassination attempt by a rival tribe member hidden in a crowd. To show his gratitude, Shaka permitted European settlers to enter and operate in the Zulu kingdom. Shaka observed several demonstrations of European technology and knowledge, but he held that the Zulu way was superior to that of the foreigners.

== Death ==
Dingane and Mhlangana, Shaka's half-brothers, appeared to have made at least two attempts to assassinate Shaka before they succeeded, with support from the Mpondo elements and some disaffected iziYendane people. Shaka had made enough enemies among his own people to hasten his demise. It came relatively quickly after the death of his mother, Nandi, in October 1827 and the devastation caused by Shaka's subsequent erratic behavior. According to Donald Morris, Shaka ordered that no crops should be planted during the following year of mourning, no milk (the basis of the Zulu diet at the time) was to be used, and any woman who became pregnant was to be killed along with her husband. At least 7,000 people who were deemed to be insufficiently grief-stricken were executed, although the killing was not restricted to humans; cows were slaughtered so that their calves would know what losing a mother felt like.

Shaka was killed by three assassins sometime in 1828; September is the most frequently cited date, when almost all available Zulu manpower had been sent on yet another mass sweep to the north. This left the royal kraal critically lacking in protection. It was all the conspirators needed. An iNduna named Mbopa created a diversion, and Dingane and Mhlangana struck the fatal blows. Shaka's corpse was dumped by his assassins in an empty grain pit, which was then filled with stones and mud. The exact location is unknown. A monument was built at one alleged site. Historian Donald Morris holds that the true site is somewhere on Couper Street in the village of KwaDukuza, in KwaZulu-Natal, South Africa.

Dingane assumed power and embarked on an extensive purge of pro-Shaka elements and chieftains, over the course of several years, in order to secure his position. The initial problem Dingane faced was maintaining the loyalty of the Zulu fighting regiments. He set up his main residence at Mgungundlovu and established his authority over the Zulu kingdom. Dingane ruled for some twelve years, during which time he fought, disastrously, against the Voortrekkers, and against another half-brother, Mpande, who, with Boer and British support, took over the Zulu leadership in 1840, ruling for some 30 years.

== Social and military revolution ==
Some older histories have doubted the military and social innovations customarily attributed to Shaka, denying them outright, or attributing them variously to European influences. More modern researchers argue that such explanations fall short, and that the general Zulu culture, which included other tribes and clans, contained a number of practices that Shaka could have drawn on to fulfill his objectives, whether in raiding, conquest or hegemony. Some of these practices are shown below.

=== Weapons changes ===
Shaka is often said to have been dissatisfied with the long throwing assegai, and is credited with having introduced a new variant of the weapon: the iklwa, a short stabbing spear with a long, broad, sword-like spearhead.

Although he is credited with introducing the iklwa to his people, Shaka likely did not invent it himself. He most likely outsourced it from Nzama, who later had a feud with him because he did not want to pay for the spears. Deneys Reitz also reports an account that Shaka's use of the iklwa was inspired by a British explorer, a Dr. Cowan, who told him that British troops owed their military success to the bayonet.

According to Zulu scholar John Laband, Shaka insisted that his warriors train with the weapon, which gave them a "terrifying advantage over opponents who clung to the traditional practice of throwing their spears and avoiding hand-to-hand conflict." The throwing spear was not discarded, but used as an initial missile weapon before close contact with the enemy, when the shorter stabbing spear was used in hand-to-hand combat.

It is also supposed that Shaka introduced a larger, heavier version of the Nguni shield. Furthermore, it is believed that he taught his warriors how to use the shield's left side to hook the enemy's shield to the right, exposing the enemy's ribs for a fatal spear stab. In Shaka's time, these cowhide shields were supplied by the king, and they remained the king's property. Different-coloured shields distinguished different amabutho within Shaka's army. Some had black shields, others used white shields with black spots, and some had white shields with brown spots, while others used pure brown or white shields.

=== Mobility of the army ===
The story that sandals were discarded to toughen the feet of Zulu warriors has been noted in various military accounts such as The Washing of the Spears, Like Lions They Fought, and Anatomy of the Zulu Army. Implementation was typically blunt. Those who objected to going without sandals were simply killed. Shaka drilled his troops frequently, in forced marches that sometimes covered more than 80 kilometres (50 mi) a day in a fast trot over hot, rocky terrain. He also drilled the troops to carry out encirclement tactics.

Historian John Laband dismisses these stories as myth, writing: "What are we to make, then, of [European trader Henry Francis] Fynn's statement that once the Zulu army reached hard and stony ground in 1826, Shaka ordered sandals of ox-hide to be made for himself?"

Laband also dismissed the idea of an 80-kilometre (50 mi) march in a single day as ridiculous. He further claims that even though these stories have been repeated by "astonished and admiring white commentators," the Zulu army covered "no more than 19 kilometres [12 mi] a day, and usually went only about 14 kilometres [8 1/2 mi]." Furthermore, Zulus under Shaka sometimes advanced more slowly. They spent two whole days recuperating in one instance, and on another they rested for a day and two nights before pursuing their enemy. Several other historians of the Zulu and the Zulu military system, however, affirm the mobility rate of up to 80 kilometres (50 mi) per day.

=== Logistic support by youths ===
Boys aged six and over joined Shaka's force as apprentice warriors (udibi) and served as carriers of rations, supplies such as cooking pots and sleeping mats, and extra weapons until they joined the main ranks. It is sometimes held that such support was used more for very light forces designed to extract tribute in cattle and slaves from neighboring groups. Nevertheless, the concept of "light" forces is questionable. The fast-moving Zulu raiding party, or "ibutho lempi," on a mission invariably traveled light, driving cattle as provisions on the hoof, and were not weighed down with heavy weapons and supply packs.

=== Age-grade regimental system ===
Age-grade groupings of various sorts were common in the Bantu culture of the day, and indeed are still important in much of Africa. Age grades were responsible for a variety of activities, from guarding the camp, to cattle herding, to certain rituals and ceremonies. Shaka organised various grades into regiments, and quartered them in special military kraals, with regiments having their own distinctive names and insignia. The regimental system clearly built on existing tribal cultural elements that could be adapted and shaped to fit an expansionist agenda.

=== "Bull horn" formation ===
Most historians credit Shaka with initial development of the famous "bull horn" formation. It was composed of three elements:

1. The main force, the "chest," closed with the enemy impi and pinned it in position, engaging in melee combat. The warriors who formed the "chest" were senior veterans.
2. While the enemy impi was pinned by the "chest," the "horns" would flank the Impi from both sides and encircle it; in conjunction with the "chest" they would then destroy the trapped force. The warriors who formed the "horns" were young and fast juniors.
3. The "loins," a large reserve, was hidden, seated, behind the "chest" with their backs to the battle, for the sake of them not losing any confidence. The "loins" would be committed wherever the enemy impi threatened to break out of the encirclement.

=== Discipline ===
Shaka created ruthless determination in his army by instilling in his warriors the knowledge of what would happen if their courage failed them in battle or their regiments were defeated. A brutal fate awaited them and their families if they did not perform well in combat. H. Rider Haggard learned about Shaka's methods from his nephew and late 19th-century Zulu king, Cetshwayo kaMpande:

As Shaka conquered a tribe, he enrolled its remnants in his army, so that they might in their turn help to conquer others. He armed his regiments with the short stabbing Iklwa, instead of the throwing assegai which they had been accustomed to use, and kept them subject to an iron discipline. If a man was observed to show the slightest hesitation about coming to close quarters with the enemy, he was executed as soon as the fight was over. If a regiment had the misfortune to be defeated, whether by its own fault or not, it would on its return to headquarters find that a goodly proportion of the wives and children belonging to it had been beaten to death on Shaka's orders, and that he was waiting their arrival to complete his vengeance by dashing out their brains. The result was, that though Shaka's armies were occasionally defeated, they were rarely annihilated, and they never ran away.

— Haggard 1882

=== Shaka's methods versus European technology ===
The expanding Zulu power inevitably clashed with European hegemony in the decades after Shaka's death. In fact, European travellers to Shaka's kingdom demonstrated advanced technology such as firearms and writing, but the Zulu monarch was less than convinced. There was no need to record messages, he held, since his messengers stood under penalty of death should they bear inaccurate tidings. As for firearms, Shaka acknowledged their utility as missile weapons after seeing muzzle-loaders demonstrated, but he argued that in the time a gunman took to reload, he would be swamped by charging spear-wielding warriors.

The first major clash after Shaka's death took place under his successor Dingane, against expanding European Voortrekkers from the Cape. Initial Zulu success rested on fast-moving surprise attacks and ambushes, but the Voortrekkers recovered and dealt the Zulu a severe defeat from their fortified wagon laager at the Battle of Blood River. The second major clash was against the British during 1879. Once again, most Zulu successes rested on their mobility, ability to screen their forces and to close when their opponents were unfavourably deployed. Their major victory at the Battle of Isandlwana was the most prominent one, but they also forced back a British column at the Battle of Hlobane, by deploying fast-moving regiments over a wide area of rugged ravines and gullies, and attacking the British who were forced into a rapid disorderly fighting retreat, back to the town of Kambula.

=== Creator of a revolutionary warfare style ===
A number of historians argue that Shaka "changed the nature of warfare in Southern Africa" from "a ritualised exchange of taunts with minimal loss of life into a true method of subjugation by wholesale slaughter." Others dispute this characterization. A number of writers focus on Shaka's military innovations such as the iklwa – the Zulu thrusting spear, and the "buffalo horns" formation. This combination has been compared to the standardization supposedly implemented by the reorganized Roman legions under Marius.

Combined with Shaka's "buffalo horns" attack formation for surrounding and annihilating enemy forces, the Zulu combination of iklwa and shield—similar to the Roman legionaries' use of gladius and scutum—was devastating. By the time of Shaka's assassination in 1828, it had made the Zulu kingdom the greatest power in southern Africa and a force to be reckoned with, even against Britain's modern army in 1879.

—

Much controversy still surrounds the character, methods and activities of the Zulu king. From a military standpoint, historian John Keegan notes exaggerations and myths that surround Shaka, but nevertheless maintains:

Fanciful commentators called him Shaka, the Black Napoleon, and allowing for different societies and customs, the comparison is apt. Shaka is without doubt the greatest commander to have come out of Africa.

—

=== As a borrower, not an innovator ===
Some scholars hold that popular depictions of Shaka as a suddenly appearing genius creating innovation are overstated, and that to the contrary, Shaka was a borrower and imitator of indigenous methods, customs and even ruler-lineages already in place. They also argue that Shaka's line was relatively short-lived and receives undue attention, compared to other, longer established lines and rulers in the region.

It seems much more likely that Shaka, seeking to build the power of a previously insignificant chiefdom, drew on an existing heritage of statecraft known to his immediate neighbors. J.H. Soga implied as much when he used genealogical evidence to argue that the Zulu were an upstart group inferior in dignity and distinction to established chiefdoms in their region, for example, the Hlubi, Ndwandwe, and Dlamini lines. Using different informants and genealogical charts, A.T. Bryant arrived at similar conclusions. The Zulu line – "a royal house of doubtful pedigree" – was very short in comparison to the Langene, Ndwandwe, Swazi, and Hlubi lines. Using his standard formula of eighteen years per reign, Bryant calculated that the Swazi, Ndwandwe, and Hlubi lines could be traced back to the beginning of the fifteenth century, while the eponymous chief Zulu had died at the beginning of the eighteenth century.

— Etherington,

Shaka's triumphs did not succeed in obliterating or diminishing the memories of his better-born rivals. The hypothesis that several states of a new kind arose about the same time does not take account of the contrast between the short line of Shaka and the long pedigrees of his most important opponents – especially the coalition grouped around his deadly enemy Zwide (d. 1822). The founders of the states which Omer-Cooper called "Zulu-type states," including the Ndebele, the Gasa, the Ngoni, and the Swazi had all been closely associated with Zwide. Instead of hypothesizing that they all chose to imitate Shaka, it is easier to imagine that he modeled his state on theirs. And as they stemmed from ancient families it is entirely possible that states of that type existed in a more remote past. Soga and Bryant related each of them to a larger grouping they called Mho.

== Scholarship ==
=== Biographical sources ===
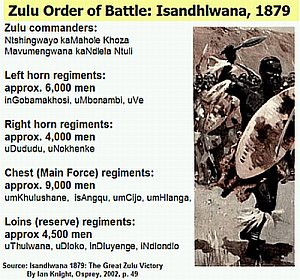
Shaka's methods reached their high point during the Zulu victory at Isandhlwana. Regimental deployments and lines of the attack showed his classic template at work.

Scholarship in recent years has revised views of the sources on Shaka's reign. The earliest are two eyewitness accounts written by European adventurer-traders who met Shaka during the last four years of his reign. Nathaniel Isaacs published his Travels and Adventures in Eastern Africa in 1836, creating a picture of Shaka as a degenerate and pathological monster, which survives in modified forms to this day. Isaacs was aided in this by Henry Francis Fynn, whose diary (actually a rewritten collage of various papers) was edited by James Stuart only in 1950. Their accounts may be balanced by the rich resource of oral histories collected around 1900 by the same James Stuart, now published in six volumes as The James Stuart Archive. Stuart's early 20th century work was continued by D. McK. Malcolm in 1950. These and other sources such as A.T. Bryant gives us a more Zulu-centered picture. Most popular accounts are based on E.A. Ritter's novel Shaka Zulu (1955), a pot boiling romance that was re-edited into something more closely resembling a history. John Wright (history professor at University of KwaZulu-Natal, Pietermaritzburg), Julian Cobbing and Dan Wylie (Rhodes University, Grahamstown) are among a number of writers who have modified these stories.

Various modern historians writing on Shaka and the Zulu point to the uncertain nature of Fynn and Isaac's accounts of Shaka's reign. A general reference work in the field is Donald Morris's "The Washing of The Spears", which notes that the sources, as a whole, for this historical era are not the best. Morris references a large number of sources, including Stuart, and A. T. Bryant's "Olden Times in Zululand and Natal", which is based on four decades of interviews of tribal sources. After sifting through these sources and noting their strengths and weaknesses, Morris generally credits Shaka with a large number of military and social innovations.

A 1998 study by historian Carolyn Hamilton summarizes much of the scholarship on Shaka towards the dawn of the 21st century in areas ranging from ideology, politics and culture, to the use of his name and image in a popular South African theme park, Shakaland. It argues that in many ways, the image of Shaka has been "invented" in the modern era according to whatever agenda persons hold. This "imagining of Shaka" it is held, should be balanced by a sober view of the historical record, and allow greater scope for the contributions of indigenous African discourse.

Military historians of the Zulu War describe Zulu fighting methods and tactics, including authors Ian Knight and Robert Edgerton. General histories of Southern Africa include Noel Mostert's "Frontiers" and a detailed account of the results from the Zulu expansion, J.D. Omer-Cooper's "The Zulu Aftermath", which advances the traditional Mfecane/Difaqane theory.

=== The Mfecane ===
==== History and legacy ====
The increased military efficiency led to more and more clans being incorporated into Shaka's Zulu empire, while other tribes moved away to be out of range of Shaka's impis. The ripple effect caused by these mass migrations would become known (though only in the twentieth century) as the Mfecane/Difaqane (annihilation).

Shaka's army set out on a massive programme of expansion & killing those who resisted in the territories he conquered. His impis (armies) were rigorously disciplined: failure in battle meant death.

At the time of his death, Shaka ruled over 250,000 people and could muster more than 50,000 warriors. His 12-year-long kingship resulted in a massive number of deaths, mostly due to the disruptions the Zulu caused in neighbouring tribes, although the exact death toll is a matter of scholarly dispute. Further unquantifiable deaths occurred during mass tribal migrations to escape his armies.

The Mfecane produced Mzilikazi of the Khumalo, a general of Shaka's. He fled Shaka's employ, and in turn conquered an empire in present-day Zimbabwe, after clashing with European groups like the Boers. The settling of Mzilikazi's people, the Ama Ndebele or Matabele, in the south of Zimbabwe with the concomitant driving of the Mashona into the north caused a tribal conflict that still resonates today. Other notable figures to arise from the Mfecane/Difaqane include Soshangane, who expanded from the Zulu area into what is now Mozambique, and Zwangendaba.

==== Disruptions of the Mfecane/Difaqane ====
The theory of the Mfecane holds that the aggressive expansion of Shaka's armies caused a brutal chain reaction across the southern areas of the continent, as dispossessed tribe after tribe turned on their neighbours in a deadly cycle of fight and conquest. Some scholars contend that this theory must be treated with caution as it generally neglects several other factors such as the impact of European encroachment, slave trading and expansion in that area of Southern Africa around the same time. Normal estimates for the death toll range from 1 million to 2 million. These numbers are, however, controversial.

According to Julian Cobbing, the development of the view that Shaka was the monster responsible for the devastation is based on the need of apartheid era historians to justify the apartheid regime's racist policies. Other scholars acknowledge distortion of the historical record by apartheid supporters and shady European traders seeking to cover their tracks, but dispute the revisionist approach, noting that stories of cannibalism, raiding, burning of villages, or mass slaughter were not developed out of thin air but based on the clearly documented accounts of hundreds of black victims and refugees. Confirmation of such accounts can also be seen in modern archaeology of the village of Lepalong, an entire settlement built underground to shelter remnants of the Kwena people from 1827 to 1836 against the tide of disruption that engulfed the region during Shakan times.

William Rubinstein wrote that "Western guilt over colonialism, have also accounted for much of this distortion of what pre-literate societies actually were like, as does the wish to avoid anything which smacks of racism, even when this means distorting the actual and often appalling facts of life in many pre-literate societies". Rubinstein also notes:

One element in Shaka's destruction was to create a vast artificial desert around his domain... 'to make the destruction complete, organized bands of Zulu murderers regularly patrolled the waste, hunting for any stray men and running them down like wild pig'... An area 200 miles [320 km] to the north of the center of the state, 300 miles [480 km] to the west, and 500 miles [800 km] to the south was ravaged and depopulated...

South African historian Dan Wylie has expressed skepticism of the portrayal of Shaka as a pathological monster destroying everything within reach. He argues that attempts to distort his life and image have been systematic— beginning with the first European visitors to his kingdom. One visitor, Nathaniel Isaacs, wrote to Henry Fynn, a white adventurer, trader and quasi-local chieftain:

Here you are about to publish. Do make Shaka out to be as bloodthirsty as you can; it helps swell out the work and make it interesting.

Fynn, according to Wylie, complied with the request, and Wylie notes that he had an additional motive to distort Shaka's image— he applied for a huge grant of land— an area allegedly depopulated by Shaka's savagery.

[Fynn] stated that Shaka had killed 'a million people.' You will still find this figure, and higher, repeated in today's literature. However, Fynn had no way of knowing any such thing: it was a thumb-suck based in a particular view of Shaka—Shaka as a kind of genocidal maniac, an unresting killing-machine. But why the inventive lie? ... Fynn was bidding for a stretch of land, which allegedly had been depopulated by Shaka.. [he insinuated], Shaka didn't deserve that land anyway because he was such a brute, while he—Fynn— was a lonely, morally upright pioneer of civilization.

Michal Lesniewski has criticised Wylie for some of his attempts to revise Western thinking about Shaka.

== Physical descriptions ==
Though much remains unknown about Shaka's personal appearance, sources tend to agree he had a strong, muscular body. He was tall and his skin tone was dark brown.

Shaka's enemies described him as ugly in some respects. He had a big nose, according to Baleka of the Qwabe, as told by her father. He also had two prominent front teeth. Her father also told Baleka that Shaka spoke as though "his tongue were too big for his mouth." Many said that he spoke with a speech impediment.

There is an anecdote that Shaka joked with one of his friends, Magaye, that he could not kill Magaye because he would be laughed at. Supposedly if he killed Magaye, it would appear to be out of jealousy because Magaye was so handsome and "Shaka himself was ugly, with a protruding forehead".

== In Zulu culture ==
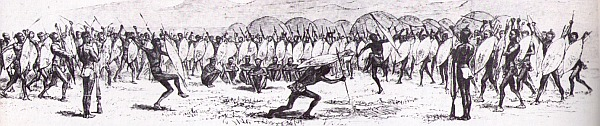
A muster and dance of Zulu regiments at Shaka's Isibaya, as recorded by European abavakashi to his kingdom, c. 1827

The figure of Shaka still sparks interest among not only the contemporary Zulu but many worldwide who have encountered the tribe and its history. The current tendency appears to be to lionise him; popular film and other media have certainly contributed to his appeal. Certain traditional Zulu cultural forms are still used to express reverence for the dead monarch. The praise song is one of the most widely used poetic forms in Africa, applying not only to spirits but to men, animals, plants and even towns.

He is Shaka the unshakeable,
Thunderer-while-sitting, son of Menzi
He is the bird that preys on other birds,
The battle-axe that excels over other battle-axes in sharpness,
He is the long-strided pursuer, son of Ndaba,
Who pursued the sun and the moon.
He is the great hubbub like the rocks of Nkandla
Where elephants take shelter
When the heavens frown...

— Traditional Zulu praise song, English translation by Ezekiel Mphahlele

Other Zulu sources are sometimes critical of Shaka, and numerous negative images abound in Zulu oral history. When Shaka's mother Nandi died for example, the monarch ordered a massive outpouring of grief including mass executions, forbidding the planting of crops or the use of milk, and the killing of all pregnant women and their husbands. Oral sources record that in this period of devastation, a single Zulu, a man named "Gala", eventually stood up to Shaka and objected to these measures, pointing out that Nandi was not the first person to die in Zululand. Taken aback by such candid talk, the Zulu king is supposed to have called off the destructive edicts, rewarding the blunt teller-of-truths with a gift of cattle.

The figure of Shaka thus remains an ambiguous one in African oral tradition, defying simplistic depictions of the Zulu king as a heroic, protean nation builder on one hand, or a depraved monster on the other. This ambiguity continues to lend the image of Shaka its continued power and influence, almost two centuries after his death.

== Legacy ==
- uShaka Marine World, an aquatic theme park on the Durban beach front opened in 2004.
- The King Shaka International Airport at La Mercy, 35 km (22 mi) north of the Durban city centre was opened on 1 May 2010 in preparation for the 2010 FIFA World Cup after a protracted debate over the naming of the airport.

== In popular culture ==
- Jah Shaka, British Jamaican sound system operator, prolific conscious roots reggae and dub record producer and sound engineer was named in honour of Shaka Zulu.
- A large wooden statue representing Shaka is located at Camden Market in London.
- Shaka features in Nada the Lily (1892), an historical adventure novel by Sir H. Rider Haggard. Haggard refers to him using the alternate spelling of Chaka.
- Shaka Zulu, a 10-part 1986 SABC TV miniseries about Shaka, which starred Henry Cele in the title role. The series was written by Joshua Sinclair.
- Shaka has been featured as a playable leader for the Zulu civilization in the first six games in the Civilization series.
- A television series entitled King Shaka is being developed at Showtime, with Antoine Fuqua directing and executive producing.
- Shaka Ilembe is a 13-episode South African TV show on Mzansi Magic.
- Shaka Zulu (portrayed by DeStorm Power) appeared in an episode of the comedy series Epic Rap Battles of History, pitted against Julius Caesar.

== See also ==
- List of Zulu kings
- Hintsa kaKhawuta
- Amathole Mountains
- Matiwane
- African military systems before 1800
- African military systems (1800–1900)
- African military systems after 1900
- Moshoeshoe I
- Ndebele
- List of South Africans
- Chaka
- Emperor Shaka the Great
- Lion's Blood
- Sekhukhune I

Regnal titles
Preceded by Sigujana kaSenzangakhona	King of the Zulu Nation; 1816–1828	Succeeded by Dingane kaSenzangakhona
