= Senzangakhona =

Zulu chief from 1781 to 1816

Senzangakhona kaJama

King of the Zulu
- Born: c. 1762; Zululand
- Died: 1816; Zululand
- Spouses: 13 including: Mkabi kaSodubo Nzuza; Fudukazi Cele; Nandi kaBhebhe Mhlongo; Langazana kaGubeshe Gazu; Mzondwase kaGwabini Zungu; Mpikase kaMlilela Ngobese; Nteneshe kaSozindaba Buthelezi; Bhibhi kaSompisi Ntuli; Songiya kaNgotsha Hlabisa; Magulana Nene; Ncaka kaMncinci Qwabe; Mehlana kaNtopo Mgazini; Mangcengesa; Mntuli
- Issue: 23 including: Nomzinhlanga kaSenzangakhona; Dingane kaSenzangakhona; Baleka kaSenzangakhona; Nozilwana kaSenzangakhona; Mpande kaSenzangakhona; Nzibe kaSenzangakhona; Gqugqu kaSenzangakhona; Shaka kaSenzangakhona; Nomcoba kaSenzangakhona; Sigujana kaSenzangakhona; Bhakuza kaSenzangakhona; Mhlanga kaSenzangakhona; Magwaza kaSenzangakhona; Sikhakha kaSenzangakhona; Kholekile kaSenzangakhona; Mzinhlanga kaSenzangakhona; Gowujana kaSenzangakhona; Sigwebana kaSenzangakhona; Mfihlo kaSenzangakhona; Ngqojana kaSenzangakhona; Nomqotho kaSenzangakhona; Bayeka kaSenzangakhona; Noziqunga kaSenzangakhona
- Father: Jama kaNdaba
- Mother: Mthaniya kaManyelela Sibiya

Senzangakhona kaJama (c. 1762 – 1816) was the king of the Zulu Kingdom, and primarily notable as the father of three Zulu kings (Shaka, Dingane and Mpande) who ruled during the period when the Zulus achieved prominence, led by his oldest son Shaka.

== Biography ==
His father was chief Jama kaNdaba and his mother was Mthaniya Sibiya. He succeeded on his father's death. During the chieftaincy of Senzangakhona, the Zulus were a small clan in the Mthethwa confederation which was ruled by Dingiswayo.

Senzangakhona’s name is derived from the Zulu word meaning "he who acts with a good reason".

Although the Zulus practised ritual circumcision, the practice was slowly dying out. Senzangakhona and Shaka were not circumcised, marking this trend in Zulu culture.

=== Wives and children ===
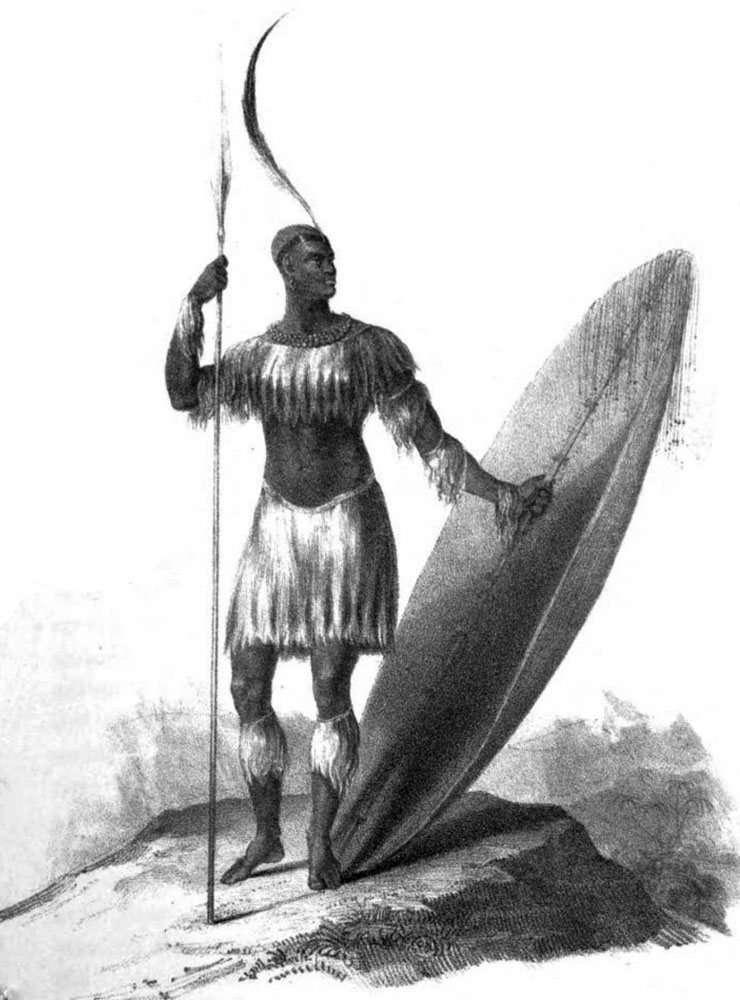
Shaka, son of Senzangakhona

Senzangakhona married at least sixteen women by which he had fourteen known sons. His daughters were not recorded.

Nandi kaBhebhe eLangeni (Nandi, daughter of Bhebhe, from eLangeni district), bore him his first son Shaka, said to have been conceived during an act of ukuhlobonga, a form of coitus interruptus without penetration allowed to unmarried couples at a time known as "the fun of the roads" (amahlaya endlela), but the lovers became carried away. Nandi and Shaka were initially accepted into Senzangakhona's kraal, and she was treated as a lesser wife. As she was not his Great Wife, Shaka was not the heir. Senzangakhona was unwilling to acknowledge Nandi as his chief consort, an important status symbol among the AmaZulu. He did have another child with her, Shaka's sister Nomcuba. Mkabi, the Great Wife, did, however, treat Nandi well. Nevertheless, Nandi's relationship with Senzangakhona eventually deteriorated, so she and Shaka were forced to leave the kraal. Bhibhi kaSompisi Ntuli was one of Senzangakhona's wives.

Senzangakhona's official heir was his son Sigujana. Sigujana took over after the death of his father in 1816. However, Sigujana's reign was short as Shaka, with the help of his ally Dingiswayo and his maternal half brother Ngwadi, had Sigujana assassinated. Shaka then raised the chieftaincy into a kingdom and became its first king.

Senzangakhona' sixth wife, Mpikase kaMlilela Ngobese, bore Dingane, who took over the Zulu kingdom after assassinating his half-brother Shaka in 1828 at present-day Stanger, in KwaZulu-Natal. The official name for this place is KwaDukuza.

Senzangakhona's ninth wife, Songiya kaNgotsha Hlabisa, bore Mpande, who became king when he overthrew Dingane in 1840. Mpande was the only son to bear him grandchildren. Mpande’s son, Cetshwayo kaMpande, was in some aspects the last great king of the Zulus before the British Empire invaded their territory.

== In culture ==
Senzangakhona is played by Conrad Magwaza in the TV miniseries Shaka Zulu and In the mini TV miniseries Shaka Ilembe, he is played by Senzo Radebe.

== Notes ==
Preceded by Jama kaNdaba	Zulu King; 1781-1816	Succeeded by Sigujana kaSenzangakhona
