= Jere Ngoni Kingdom =

1815–1848 state in southern Africa

The Jere Ngoni Kingdom was a precolonial state in modern-day Malawi that was founded in the mid-19th century as a result of the Mfecane.

== History ==
The founding of the Jere Ngoni Kingdom was precipitated by the Mfecane, a period of widespread instability and state formation in Southern Africa that was caused by pre-existing trends of political centralisation, which were themselves catalysed by the effects of international trade, environmental instability, and European colonial expansion. An early state was the Ndwandwe led by Zwide; after Zwide defeated Dingiswayo's Mthethwa c. 1816, the Mthethwa state disintegrated and some groups were incorporated into Ndwandwe. Zwide next engaged the expanding Zulu led by Shaka, but was defeated in battle around 1819. Following this defeat, Zwangendaba (one of Ndwandwe's Indunas) led his group on a long-distance migration northwards, which were called the Jere Ngoni (separate from the Maseko Ngoni). Zwangendaba initially settled around the Mkomati River (north of Delagoa Bay), but fled north after clashing with other rulers such as Soshangane, Nxaba, and Mzilikazi. Zwangendaba entered onto the Zimbabwean Plateau and raided the Rozvi Empire for several years, before crossing the Zambezi in 1835. He left some troops behind with a relative of his (Nyamazana) who later killed the Rozvi king. In 1840 Zwangendaba's forces massacred many Tonga for allegedly causing him illness, and they captured many Chewa and Tumbuka locals. The Jere Ngoni later reached the Ufipa Plateau, where Zwangendaba died in the late 1840s.

After Zwangendaba's death the Jere Ngoni split into several groups amid civil war over succession, and his son M'mbelwa led the largest contingent to settle in modern-day Mzimba District in Malawi c. 1850. The Jere Ngoni incorporated numerous local groups into the state, and often raided villages on the fringes of the state for captives, cattle, and food, causing widespread disruption in the region over the following decades. The state was later incorporated into the British Central Africa Protectorate.

== See also ==
- Nkhamanga Kingdom
- Gomani V
