= Qwabe =

Nguni royal family

Locations of the Ndwandwe, Mthethwa and Qwabe kingdoms on a map of present-day KwaZulu-Natal, South Africa

The Qwabe Kingdom (Zulu: amaQwabe) is the senior branch of the House of Malandela, the royal pre-Zulu family, descendant from Qwabe (1575) the son of Malandela or Mayandeya.

== Origins ==
The amaQwabe are the senior and larger clan of the Makhanya and the Zulu clans all descending from one common ancestor, Malandela. They are descendant from Qwabe (whose name means a Large 'musical bow') the eldest son of Malandela and his wife Nozidiya/Nozinja of the Zungu clan. Following the death of Malandela, Qwabe became the king. In accordance with Nguni customary practices when Qwabe inherited the kingship, he went and built a new homestead to serve as the center of the kingdom, leaving his younger brother Zulu to rule over a few people who remained at their father Malandela's estate.

The kingdom thrived sometime in the 18th century as "one of the most ancient and famous tribes in Natal and Zululand". At its peak the amaQwabe occupied central KwaZulu-Natal, they were found beneath the Amandawe and Ngoye Hills, south of the Mhlathuze River until it reached the Mthethwa and Dube areas, up the Mhlathuze River almost as far as Nkandla forest, winding up between the Mhlathuze and Tugela Rivers and finally overflowing into Natal.

== Expansion and political structure ==
After separating from his brethren with the majority of Malandela's people, Qwabe and his followers settled beneath the Ngoye hills. This is where Qwabe built the kingdoms new center, eMthandeni. Before amaQwabe occupation the area between the Mhlathuze and Tugela rivers was occupied by the Cele clan a sub-branch of the Mthethwa kingdom. The Qwabe drove out the Thuli and Cele clans as well as the amaMbili, amaKwela and amaKomo tribes, from between the Mhlathuze and the Tugela rivers into the coast district of Natal. Before the Shaka era the amaQwabe kingdom had already expanded control over parts of Natal south of the Thukela River. The expansion of this kingdom over territory and smaller chiefdom's was enough to regard it as one of the few larger kingdoms of the region.

The kingdom under Phakatwayo kaKhondlo and generally was characterized by seven large villages, each headed by an important member from the ruling lineage. Regiments were round up by village rather than age, this included women regiments also. Evidence suggest that the authority to form women regiments (isigodlo) was only given to senior powerful kings such as Phakatwayo of The Qwabe, Dingiswayo of the Mthetwa and

Zwide of the Ndwandwe for instance.

Qwabe Royal House Gumede
- Parent family: Nguni
- Country: South Africa
- Founder: Qwabe kaMalandela
- Current head: Makhosini Wellington Qwabe
- Connected families: Khuzwayo; Makhanya; Mbedu; Gcabashe; Sabela; Duze; Mgobhozi; Chili; Njapha; Dlamuka; Maphanga; Sishi; Mzukwase (Myeza)
- Cadet branches: Zulu; Zethembe & Zingelwayo (Sibiya); Ngema (Mngadi); Mcineka; Khanyile
