= Ndau people =

Ethnic group in Zimbabwe and Mozambique

The Ndau are an ethnic group indigenous to south-eastern Zimbabwe in the districts of Chipinge and Chimanimani. They are also found in parts of Bikita, in the Zambezi valley, in central Mozambique along the coast, and in central Malawi. Their presence in these regions was first documented in the 1500s by Portuguese missionary João dos Santos.

The Ndau share historical and cultural connections with several other ethnic groups in the region, including the Kalanga, Venda, and Shona peoples, particularly through their common historical association with the Mapungubwe trading network. In modern times, Nguni influences have also been very strong.

== Etymology ==
The etymology of the name "Ndau" has multiple interpretations. In the Ndau language, "Ndau" means "land", similar to the neighboring Manyika people's name, which translates to "Owners of the Land". The phrase "Ndau yedu" in the Ndau language, means "our land", with an alternative etymology suggesting that the name derives from the Nguni words "Amading'indawo", meaning "those looking for a place", reportedly used by the Gaza Nguni to describe them. Another theory of the Ndau name origin derives from the way by which these people greeted a chief or an important foreigner: kneeling, they clap their hands and repeatedly and rhythmically say, "ndau ui ui, ndau ui ui!"

== History ==
The Ndau people comprise five major subgroups: Magova, Mashanga, Vatomboti, Madanda and Teve. Historical records indicate their early involvement in trade networks centered around Mapungubwe (literally "place of Jackals"), where they engaged with various groups including the Khoisan peoples and Arab traders. Their trade goods included traditional herbs, spiritual items, animal skins and bones. They were particularly known for trading in textiles, called "Mpalu", "Njeti" and "Vukotlo", distinctive red, white, and blue cloths, as well as golden beads.

The ancient Ndau people are historically related to the Manyika and Karanga (Shona) tribes. Because of large-scale conquests by the Ngunis in the 1820s, much of the Ndau ancestry evolved to include the Nguni bloodline and ancestry. In the 1820s, during a period of severe drought, northern Nguni armies particularly the Zulu, Swazi, Ndwandwe, Khumalo, Xhosa and northern and Southern Ndebele people, who speak related Bantu languages and inhabit southeastern Africa from Cape Province to southern Mozambique, began to migrate to Mozambique from what is now South Africa. One Nguni chief, Nxaba Msane, established a short-lived kingdom inland from Sofala, but in 1837 he was defeated by Soshangane, a powerful Nguni rival. Eventually Soshangane established his capital in the highlands of the middle Sabie River in what is present-day South Africa. The Nguni-Shangaans established the Gaza Empire in southern Mozambique and subjugated many of the Ndau people who were already living in that area. The Nguni invaders killed many Ndau men and took their wives. Due to this, many Ndau people have a lineage with Nguni influences. This was further cemented by the intermarriages between the Nguni and Ndau. The more appropriate term to describe the resultant group including the modern Ndau is Shangaan. The Ndau culture also evolved to include Nguni practices. Many Nguni words became part of the Ndau language.

According to Earthy, when the Ndau people were conquered by the Ndwandwe-Ngunis, some of the Ndau people took refuge among the Chopi people, who had amassed rifles from the Portuguese in order to protect themselves. It is suggested that some of the Chopi people remained independent of the Nguni Gaza Empire. In forming the Gaza empire, Soshangane and his Nguni impis (armies) overran and incorporated the Tsonga, Shongonono, Ngomane, Hlengwe, Nyai, Rhonga, Shona, Xhosa, Zulu, Shenga, and Chopi as well as the Ndau tribes in a new nation with the people collectively called Shangani.

With the prolonged drought, the rise of Gaza, the dominance of the slave trade, and the expansion of Portuguese control in the Zambezi Valley, the once-mighty African chieftaincies of the Zambezi region declined. In their place, valley warlords established fortified strongholds at the confluence of the major rivers, where they raised private armies and raided for slaves in the interior. The most powerful of these warlords was Manuel António de Sousa, also known as Gouveia, a settler from Portuguese India, who by the middle of the 19th century controlled most of the southern Zambezi Valley and a huge swath of land to its south. North of the Zambezi, Islamic slave traders rose to power from their base in Angoche, and the Yao chiefs of the north migrated south to the highlands along the Shire River, where they established their military power.

As a result of this settlement in Chipinge, some Ndau-Shangaan settled in what is now Mozambique. Through hundreds of years of mixing with other Shona groups, the Ndau language and customs evolved. It is possible that the ancient Ndau are one of the first ancestral tribes of the Ngunis, similarly to the Mthethwas, Lala, and Debe who are descended from the Thonga-Tekelas. This is all conjecture at this point, and further research would need to be carried out to establish this.

From 1931, young Ndau speakers began to gradually accept Shona as their primary identity. However, Ndau’s constitutional recognition as a separate official language in 2013 contributed to the rejuvenation of the ChiNdau identity in Zimbabwe.

== Language ==
Ancient Ndau could be one of the most ancient forms of all modern-day Nguni languages. This is evident in the wealth of Nguni words in the Ndau language, including Nguni names and surnames. In the strict sense of the term, the Ndau language is mainly spoken in the following southern districts of Sofala Province: Machanga, Chibabava, Machaze (Danda), Buzi and in Nhamatanda, Dondo and Beira (Bangwe) and is mutually intelligible with the Shona language. It is also spoken to a lesser extent in Mambone (Inhambane province) and Mossurize. Ndau people also speak Portuguese in Mozambique, English in Zimbabwe and Xhosa in South Africa. In Zimbabwe, Ndau is mainly spoken in Chipinge and Chimanimani districts. Ndau is also one of the languages used in churches in Beira.

== Demographics ==
As of 1997, it was estimated that there were 581,000 speakers of Ndau in Mozambique. There are many Ndau-Shangani clans residing in South Africa.

Today the Ndau-Shangaan are largely identified by these surnames: Sakwinje, Semwayo, Simango, Sibiya, Dhliwayo, Dube, Makuyana, Mlambo, Mthethwa, Mhlanga, Nxumalo Hlatshwayo, Sithole, Kwidini, Sidhile, Dhlakama, Bhila and Zharikiya. It is also worth noting that not everyone called by these names can be identified as Ndau, with the exception of Zharikiya, as these are Nguni names which are common among the Nguni and can be found in Zululand as well as Matebeleland from peoples who have no link with the Ndau.

Limila, Gonjo, Shipandagwala, Shingomungomu and Shiriyadengha are the Ndau-Shangani people from the Ndau Sithole Clan (there are many Sitholes who have no connection with the Ndau; Sithole is of Nguni origin in Zululand) who moved from the Zambezi Valley along the Limpopo River and traded with both Arabs and Portuguese. There are many clans from the Ndau-Shangani ethnic groups such as Mlambo, acknowledged as the father of Ndau peoples, Simango, Khumbula, Mhlanga, Ndlakama, Mashaba and Moyana (Gumbi, Phahla).

The Ndau people in Zimbabwe also play a major part in the history of these sacred people, as most of them are situated in Chipinge and Chimanimani. The Ndau in Zimbabwe are identified with the following surnames: Sibanda, Moyo, Nyandoro, Magoro-Nkosho, Dube, Semwayo, Moyana and others that have not yet been discovered.

== Politics ==
RENAMO, the Mozambican National Resistance Movement, draws support from the Shangaan in the Sofala province of Mozambique (the birthplace of its leader Afonso Dhlakama, as well as the Catholic archbishop of Beira), in part due to their poor socio-economic conditions and their so far too weak inclusion in foreign financial investments and socio-economic developmental programs of the governing party.

The first president of ZANU in Zimbabwe prior to independence was Ndabaningi Sithole, from near Mount Selinda. Once Robert Mugabe came to power, Sithole formed his own party, ZANU-Ndonga that continues to garner widespread support among the Ndau-Shangani community.

== Religion and spirituality ==
The traditional Ndau identify themselves as one people, as they regard Musikavanthu/Mlambo as their common ancestor. Although they identify themselves by different names and surnames, such as Moyana (meaning "sheep"), they ultimately consider themselves to be Dziva due to being Musikavanthu's descendants. To this day, Musikavanthu holds great respect and renown as a rainmaker and is considered the Earthly embodiment of the "Creator of the Universe", known as "Mwari Musikavanthu" or "Musikavanhu" among the Shona people.

There have been considerable efforts to diminish the importance of the Musikavanthu/Mlambo chieftaincy in modern-day Zimbabwe. Robert Mugabe sought to downplay the significance of this unique chieftaincy by promoting fallacies and falsehoods that portrayed his ancestry as descending from the Munhumutapas. The Munhumutapa Empire was founded by Nyatsimba Mutota, who was of the Dziva totem, being a son of Dziva Musikavanhu. Musikavanhu had left Great Zimbabwe after its abandonment due to transgressions that had been committed by all peoples against Musikavanthu's commands/Mhiko.

However, due to missionary activity, many Ndau people have also embraced the Christian religion.

== Ndau witchcraft and sorcery ==
The Ndau people are known to be very good herbalists, and they are openly described by Mozambicans to be the most feared black magicians. Historical records describe the Ndau as "humble and nonviolent" people, yet they are known to use magic when offended or to deal with transgressors. Their spirits are also known to fiercely avenge deaths due to murders or other unjust means.

Ndau n'anga are traditional healers who also communicate with spirits and can heal or harm people using traditional medicine (mushonga). N'anga can be male or female, more often female, and all n'anga are believed to be capable of helping people or harming them. When asked to resolve a case of spirit aggression, the n'anga must first determine the nature of the spirit, and whether it was sent by a witch or another n'anga. These spirits can be captured in a ceremony called "ukufemba", where the spirit comes and introduces itself while explaining how it ended up in one's family, which is a spirit's way of seeking justice. The majority of Zimbabweans are known to fear anyone who threatens them with Ndau sorcery and witch doctor consultations from the same area. They are therefore able to fight injustices, despite their non-violent nature, using sorcery and magic.

N'anga are often called upon by communities to manipulate the weather, particularly during droughts or floods, by appealing to the nzuzu. N'anga practice divination by inviting madzvoka to possess them, thus allowing the n'anga to perceive remote places and events. Using this technique, n'anga can determine the perpetrator of a crime, locate lost people or objects, and discover if a person is lying or telling the truth.

== Notable Ndau people ==
- Ndabaningi Sithole, Zimbabwean politician and novelist
- Afonso Dhlakama, former leader of RENAMO
