= Ndwandwe–Zulu War =

1817–1819 war in South Africa

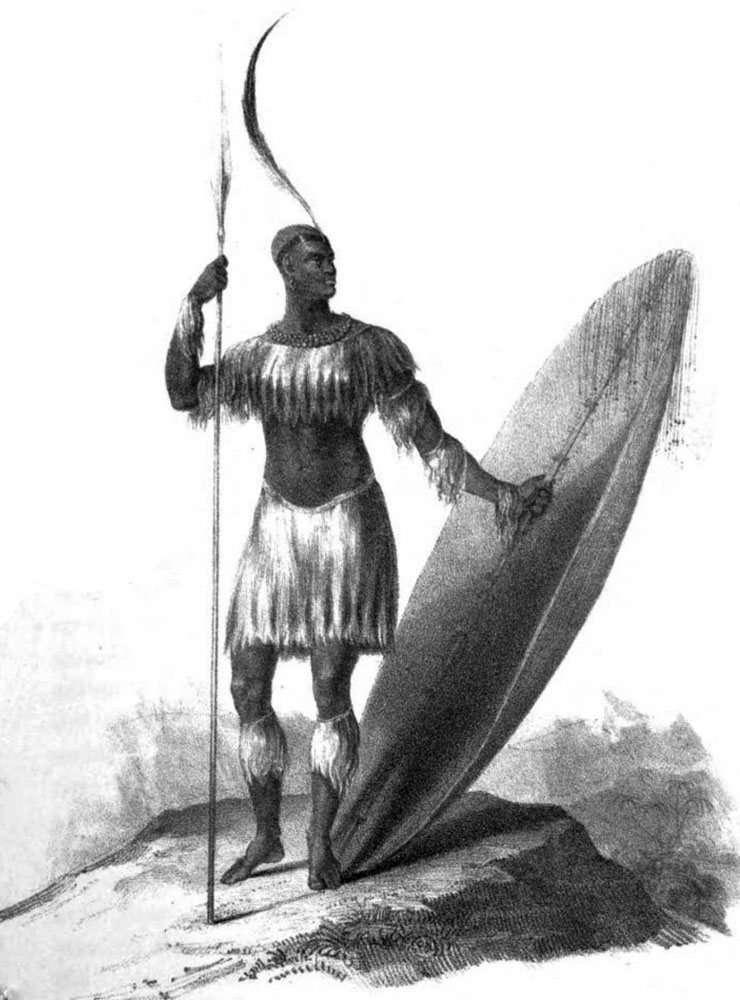
Date	1817–1819
Location	Zululand, South Africa
Result	Zulu victory

Belligerents
Zulu Kingdom	Ndwandwe Kingdom

Commanders and leaders
Shaka Zulu	Zwide Langa

Strength
4,000	25,000

Casualties and losses
Unknown	Unknown

The Ndwandwe–Zulu War of 1817–1819 was a war fought between the expanding Zulu Kingdom and the Ndwandwe tribe in South Africa.

The Zulus were originally a tiny tribe that had migrated to the eastern plateau of present-day South Africa; they became a strong tribal nation largely due to the efforts of an ambitious chieftain named Shaka (c. 1787–1828, reigned 1816–1828). A rebellious young man, Shaka was estranged from his father, who was a Zulu chief named Senzangakhona, and became a warrior with the Mthethwa people. The Mthethwa paramount chieftain Dingiswayo helped Shaka become recognized as head of the Zulus after Senzangakhona died in 1816. The two chieftains were close friends, and their warriors fought together against common enemies, such as the Ndwandwe headed by King Zwide. After Dingiswayo was captured and executed by Zwide, the Mthethwa people placed themselves under Shaka and took the Zulu name. Shaka revolutionized traditional ways of fighting by introducing the iklwa, a short stabbing spear, as a weapon and by organizing warriors into disciplined units that fought in close formation behind large cowhide shields.

The Ndwandwe and the Zulus met in combat at the Battle of Mhlatuze River in 1819. By this time the Ndwandwe had adopted Zulu battle tactics and weapons so Shaka wore the invaders down with guerrilla tactics before launching his major attack when the Ndwandwe army was divided during the crossing of the Mhlatuze River. Zulu warriors arrived at Zwide's headquarters near present-day Nongoma before news of the defeat, and approached the camp singing Ndwandwe victory songs to gain entry. Zwide himself escaped with a handful of followers, and most of the Ndwandwe abandoned their lands and migrated north establishing Zulu-like (named Ngoni after the ethno-linguistic name "Nguni") kingdoms in Zambia, Malawi, Mozambique and Tanzania. This was the final phase of the Mfecane, a catastrophic, bloody civil war and eventual migration of many different tribes in the area, initially (ca. 1802) caused by famine but ultimately as a result of escaping from the Zulus. The Ngoni groups caused their own havoc by using Zulu tactics in war. They established stronger political units in other countries and thus posed a threat to European colonisation, for example during the Maji-Maji Rebellion in German East Africa (1905–1907). Shaka was the ultimate victor, and his people still live today throughout Zululand, with customs and a way of life that can be easily traced to Shaka's day.

== See also ==
- Anglo-Zulu War
- Battle of Gqokli Hill
- History of South Africa
- Military history of South Africa
- Battle of Mhlatuze River
