= Soshangane =

Founder and Monarch of the Gaza Empire (1780–1858)

Soshangana Ka Gasa Zikode

First Monarch of the Gaza Empire
- Reign: 1825–1858
- Successor: Mzila
- Born: Soshangana Nxumalo c. 1780; Present-day KwaNongoma, KwaZulu
- Died: 1858 (aged 77–78); Chaimite, Gaza Empire

Soshangana KaZikode (c. 1780 – c. 1858), born Soshangana Nxumalo, was the founder and first ruler of the Gaza Empire, which, at its peak, spanned from the Limpopo River in southern Mozambique to the Zambezi River in the north. He ruled the Gaza state from 1825 until his death in 1858. Soshangana was also known by the name Manukosi.

== Early life ==
Soshangana was born circa 1780 in present-day KwaNongoma, KwaZulu, to Zikode kaGasa, a chief of the junior branch (iKhohlo) of the Nxumalo clan of the Ndwandwe people. His younger brother was Mhlabawadabuka. The Gasa family occupied the Mkhuze region near eTshanini Mountain (also known as Ghost Mountain), while the senior branch, under Zwide, resided in Magudu near the Pongola Valley. During this period, the Ndwandwe were gaining military power, and Zwide ascended to the Ndwandwe-Nxumalo throne after the death of his father, Langa KaXaba.

== The Emergence of Northern Nguni Kingdoms ==
During the wars that engulfed the Nguni states, three powerful chiefdoms emerged. The first was the Ndwandwe confederacy under Zwide, the second was the Ngwane state ruled by Sobhuza I, and the third was the Mthethwa confederacy led by Dingiswayo. These large states were governed by paramount chiefs who demanded tributes from numerous smaller states, communities, and clans. While the subordinate states acknowledged the central ruler's authority in matters such as state rituals, initiation rites, tribute payment, and warfare, they retained significant autonomy in their daily affairs.

== The Ndwandwe Confederacy ==
The Ndwandwe confederacy came into prominence in the middle of the eighteenth century. Its members originally migrated from the Tembe Kingdom in the interior of Delagoa Bay towards the end of 17th century. In the earlier years, the Ndwandwe occupied the whole northern part of Zululand, and more specifically, from the Pongola River in the north to the southern point of the Black Umfolozi and from Ngome in the north-west, eastward to St. Lucia Bay on the sea. The Ndwandwe rulers then embarked on an expansionist policy by subjugating and incorporating other smaller communities to their neighbourhood. The political authority of the Ndwandwe increased tremendously as they annexed several other communities to their own state, and their borders grew quite extensive. This made the Ndwandwe rulers the first Nguni rulers to control a large state from the various small communities in the region. In achieving this, they did not only make use of military force, they also exploited old institutions and adopted them to serve new purposes. For example, the Ndwandwe rulers, made use of military regiments recruited through traditional initiation of males and females of the same age group.

It is likely that Zwide and his predecessors were among the first Nguni rulers to see some political significance in the practice of coordinating circumcision and initiation rites on a state–wide basis. These ceremonies were henceforth organised from the centre and youths from all the territories under the Ndwandwe were made members of national age groups. In periods of war, these age groups were converted into military regiments. Apart from the military utility of the national age-group, they also served to weld different parts of the Ndwandwe confederacy together. In order to enhance their own authority and create an aura of invincibility round themselves, the Ndwandwe rulers relied on a widespread use of magical and religious influence. For example, Zwide made use of a large number of magicians and medicine men to build up and spread news of his power throughout the neighbouring communities. He also made use of diplomatic marriages to cement relationships with some of the other states in the region. His sister married Dingiswayo, the Mthethwa ruler, while his daughters married Sobhuza, the Swazi king, and Mashobana, the Khumalo ruler and father to Mzilikazi, the king of the Ndebele.

== The Nguni and Ndwandwe Chiefs ==
The source and stream of the Ndwandwe/ Nxumalo royalty is steeped right at the beginning of the Nguni people, and the very first Nguni, Chief Ndlovu. Chief Ndlovu ‘s Chiefdom is believed to have started around the year 800-920 A.D., when he broke off from his own group, the Bantu, ‘’Batho’ or the ‘’Ntu’’. The Bantu people divided up into Tswana and Nguni streams. The Nguni left behind the Tswana stream while proceeding south. Ndlovu was the greatest Chief in this part of the continent, in that he founded many nations. He became the father of many nations, the Xhosa, the Zulus, the Ndebele, Ngwane/Swazi, Ndwandwe (Shangana) Thonga, Ndawu, etc. All Nguni speaking tribes and nations, owe their identity and cultural heritage to this great Chief Ndlovu . In turn the Ndwandwe nation also owes their identity to their Chief Nxumalo. When the Nguni subjects address their Paramount Chief, in praise singing, they would say: Wena we Ndlovu! Wena we Ndlovu! Wena we Ndlovu! Bayethe! Bayethe! Bayethe! In the case of Ndwandwe subjects addressing their Paramount Chief, they will say Ndwandwe! and the respond would be Nxumalo!

== King Zwide II ==
Nxumalo Zwide was born around 1750s. He was the son of chief Langa of the Ndwandwe clan. His mother was Ntombazi. Zwide‘s generals of war were Soshangana, Mzilikazi Khumalo, Nxaba Msene, and Zwangendaba of the Jele tribe. The greatest task of building the Ndwandwe confederacy fell on Zwide who came to the throne in 1790. He proceeded to build on foundations laid by his grandfather and father by making use of old customs and practices. He reached the peak of his rule at the same time as Dingiswayo of the neighbouring and rival Mthethwa Confederacy. Zwide made use of magical and religious influence, for example he made use of a number of magicians and medicine men to build up and spread news of his power throughout the neighbouring communities. He also made use of his diplomatic marriages to cement relationships with other states in the region. His sister married Dingiswayo the Mthethwa ruler, while his daughter Thandiwe married Sobhuza, the Swazi king and Mashobana the Khumalo ruler. However, Zwide was astute enough not to allow such dynastic alliances to stand in the way of his expansionist policy. Despite the fact that Sobhuza was his in-law, Zwide attacked his capital because Sobhuza laid claim to the fertile arable land of the Ndwandwe in the Pongola valley. The Ndwandwe army emerged victorious and expelled Sobhuza from Pongola, driving him and his followers in a northerly direction where Sobhuza later laid the foundation of the Swazi nation. By 1818, Zwide made the Ndwandwe tribe along the Mfolozi River very strong. In the same year, 1818, war broke out between the Ndwandwe tribe and the Mthethwa tribe. In that war Zwide ambushed Dingiswayo and killed him, after which he defeated the Mthethwa tribe.

After capturing and killing Dingiswayo, Zwide sent his messengers to Shaka, asking Shaka to pledge his allegiance to him. “Now that I have removed your head” Zwide had boasted, “why don’t you just bring the whole body before me, or I will toss the body into the river Thukela”. Shaka had been expecting this, but had summoned enough courage to reply to Zwide: “The body had two heads like the great river-snake Nkanyamba. You were just too foolish to see the other head”. Shaka immediately incorporated the Mthethwa with his own tribe and built a powerful army, but it was yet smaller than that of Ndwandwe. In 1818 Zwide sent his army to attack the Amazulu, but Shaka, a clever general, tricked them. The Zulu army was small and weak, but Shaka knew that the Ndwandwe army did not carry food on its raids. When the Ndwandwe’s forces entered the Zulu kingdom, they found no food because the Zulu army had burnt or buried it. The Zulu army had also gone hiding- with all the kingdom’s cattle. One night, the Zulus attacked the Ndwandwe where they had set up camp in the Zulu kingdom, killing many of the Amabutho as they slept.

This forced the Ndwandwe to give up the attack and return home. Although the Amazulu had managed to repel the Ndwandwe, they had not defeated them. The Ndwandwe were still a threat to the neighbouring chiefdoms. The Zulus joined forces with their neighbours, and in 1819, the Amabutho under the command of Shaka were strong enough to meet the Ndwandwe in battle. They fought on the banks of the Mhlathuzi River, and although the two armies were evenly matched, the Zulu triumphed. Zwide fled with the remnant of his followers, eventually settling in the upper Nkomati valley in the eastern Transvaal present day Mpumalanga Province. In 1826 Zwide’s successor, Sikhunyana, led an Ndwandwe force back to attack the Zulu, only for it to be utterly decimated in a short engagement.

Five of Zwide‘s son `Nomahlanjana, Mbejwa, Sixobana, Nombengula and Dayingubo perished in the battle field. Nomahlanjana was Zwide‘s heir. Zwide with his two remaining sons Sikhunyana and Somaphungu and two daughters Thandile and Fikile managed to escape northwards to the present Mpumalanga Province and settled along the Nkomati River. His two daughters were later married to Sobuza I. Thandile gave birth to Mzamose and Mavuso II, while Fikile‘s son was Ndwandwe. Zwide died in 1825 in the present Mpumalanga province.

Soshangana’s real name was Manukuza II. He named himself Soshangana because (Owa shingela imizana ya Bantu). Bryant states that Soshangana Nxumalo was the son of Zikode Nxumalo the son of Gasa Nxumalo the originator of the branch and his mother was Ngubuviya Ntyayintyayi. It is claimed that Soshangana and his followers were an independent people since immemorial. According to Bryant, it could be stated without doubt that Soshangana was a member of the Ndwandwe clan, at that point in time staying in the present northern KwaZulu-Natal and one of the formidable Nguni tribes, along with the Mthethwa Empire of Dingiswayo, the Ngwane of Sobhuza I, the Hlubi of Mpangazitha and the Ngwane of Matiwane. It could be accepted that Soshangana was a cousin/brother of the sovereign king of the Ndwandwe people, Zwide.

Soshangana was the chief of the Gasa-Nxumalo clan who fled away from Shaka Zulu the king of the Zulu nation in the 1820s after the Ndwandwe king Zwide suffered a defeat. In 1819 Zwide was the ruler of the royal house of Ndwandwe, while Soshangana was Ndwandwe military commander and the leader of the Gaza branch. The Gaza branch was constituted of members of the Likhohlwa part of the original royal house living in the Ndwandwe area at a place called eTshaneni, the Ghost Mountains on the Mkuze plain. It is also here where Gaza and other important leaders of Gaza branch were buried.

== The establishment of Gaza Kingdom ==
Soshangana, along with his four brothers Madjole, Ngheneya, Mpisi and Zikhata as well as his people (Gaza branch) followed the example of other Ndwandwe parties by leaving his family land at Tshaneni. Fleeing before the on coming rage of the Zulu king, they took a route along the eastern foot hills of Lubombo through Mngomezulu country to the upper Ntembe River vicinity where Captain W. Owen found them in 1822. From their meeting between Soshangana and Captain Owen, said Bryant: “This interview possesses for us here an especial historical interest – it was not only the first occasion on which these particular”‘ Ngunisi’ had ever beheld a White man, but, what is more, marked, so far as we know, the first meeting between the English and ‘Nguni’ races on detailed record”. He was not heard of again until years later when he emerged as the conqueror of the tribes of Portuguese East Africa and the potentate of the Shangana empire”. Their migration could have taken place hardly later than the year 1821 and may have been a season earlier (1820). Here Soshangana was temporarily beyond the reach of Shaka and lived in the Tembe area for about five years, enriching and strengthening himself by constant raids. Thereafter in about 1825, he crossed the Tembe River and marched in a north–westerly direction. Between 1825 and 1827 Soshangana lived on a tributary of the Nkomati River north of Lourenco Marques (now Maputo). During his sojourn in the territory of the Tembe and thereafter, Soshangana defeated almost all the Ronga clans of the vicinity of Delagoa Bay without encountering any resistance and raided their cattle. Their young women were taken captive and the defeated young men were taken up in his army. His following was reinforced by many Ndwandwe refugees after the defeat of Sikhunyani by Shaka in 1826. Soshangana and his people stayed in the region of Delagoa Bay until 1828, when Soshangana defeated Shaka’s army.

According to most traditions, the historic battle with Shaka’s forces, which confirmed Soshangana’s independence, took place at Bileni. It appears it was a few years after the retreat of the Zulu that Zwangendaba returned from the north and joined Soshangana. After two years together, mutual jealousies arose, and Zwangendaba was forced to begin the march and was to take the Ngoni through Zimbabwe, and ultimately into Zambia, Malawi and Tanzania. From 1827 to 1835-6 his residence was in the lower Limpopo valley. There he was attacked unsuccessfully by the troops of Shaka in 1828 and by those of the governor of Inhambane, M.J. da Costa. His capital was located at Ekupumuleni (resting place) near present day Chaimiti. From there, Soshangana sent his regiments in different directions to subdue local people. Using the military tactics which they had learned in Nguniland they conquered all people they attacked. The battle spelt disaster for Shaka who was murdered by his half brother that same year. After this triumphal march, Soshangana and his followers established themselves in about 1834 on the fertile lowlands of the Lower Limpopo River in the area of Bileni.

Soshangana and his group subjugated and incorporated the indigenous Tsonga, Shongonono, Ngomane, Ndzawu (Ndau), Hlengwe, Nyai, Rhonga, Shona, Senga and Chopi tribes. Many young men were incorporated into the regiments of Soshangana’s army, the women taken as wives and beasts as provisions. This incorporation brought into existence the Gaza Empire, which Soshangana named after his grand father Gaza. This group (Shangani) derive their name from his name Soshangana.

On the Save River (Sabie) Soshangana chastised the Shona (Karanga) peoples following his settling there in 1836. It is here where Bryant through his research, established that the two Nguni leaders, Soshangana and Zwangendaba met, and fought each other for three or four days until eventually Zwangendaba fled via Venda to what later became known as Bulawayo, Zimbabwe, and even further north to Malawi and Tanganyika. Following this encounter, Soshangane settled somewhat further to the eastern side on the high lands of central Save. Before long it was once again discovered by Soshangana, that he was not the only Nguni leader in the area. Nxaba, another Nguni leader, established himself at the Buzi River not too far from where Soshangana's headquarters were. Likewise Nxaba was forced to follow in the steps of Zwangendaba. This victory enabled them to expand their frontiers. Here Soshangana conveniently subjugated the peoples between the Zambezi and Inhambane and subsequently conquered the whole area south to Delagoa Bay.

In 1838 as result of the smallpox epidemic in which he lost many of his warriors, Soshangane and his followers returned to their earlier home, Bileni in the Limpopo valley, leaving his son Mzila to place the area north of the Zambezi under his tribute. He stayed at Musapa for about three years. By the time that Soshangana returned to settle in the Limpopo valley, he had brought not only all the Tsonga chiefdoms of the interior under his control, but he had also subjected many of the Tonga in the immediate neighbourhood of Inhambane. Having said that, the Gaza empire was known to be extensive and this couldn't have happened without the conquest of large populations of these groups.

== Founding of the Gaza Kingdom ==
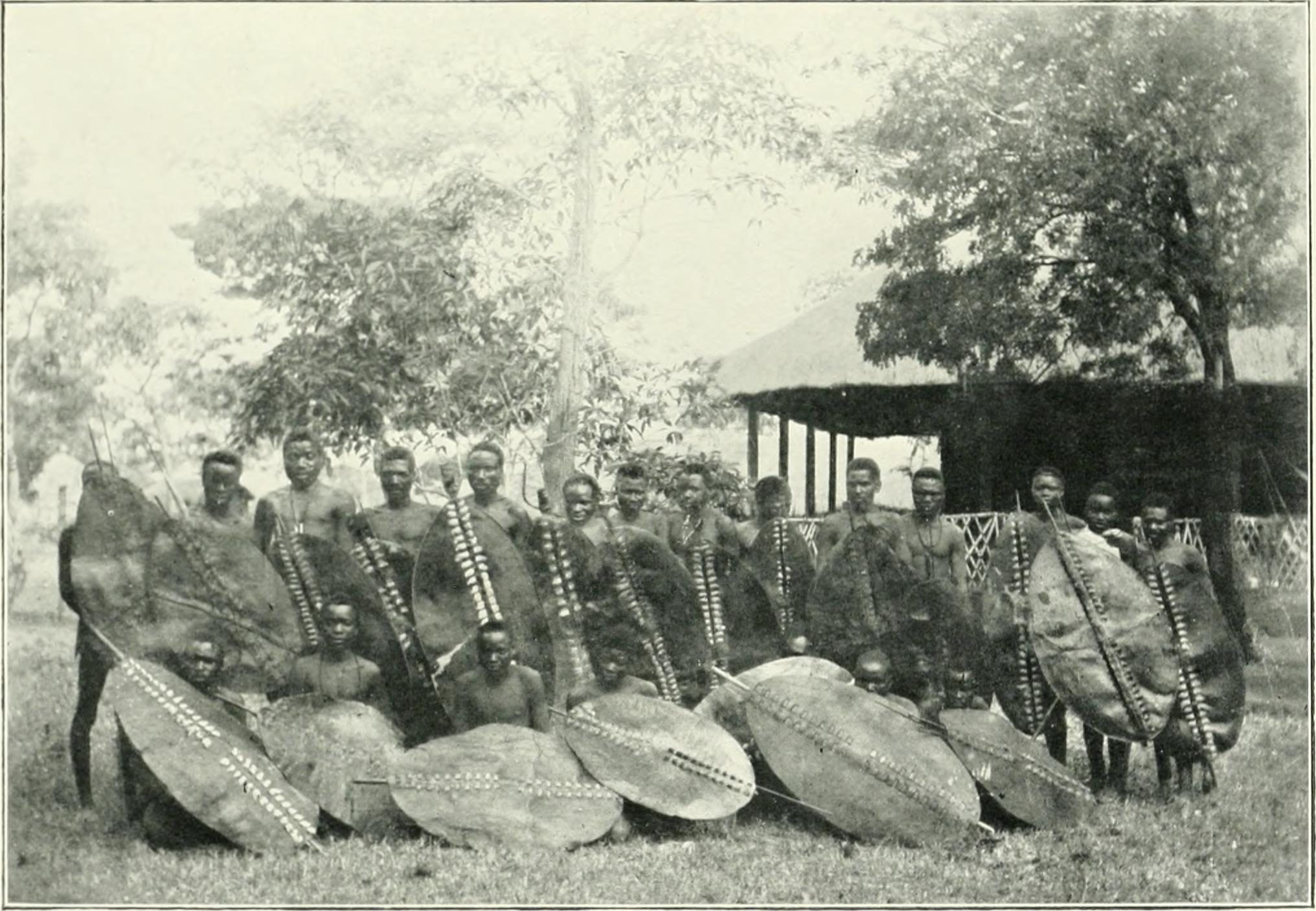
Warriors of the Angoni (or Abanguni), descendants of Zwangendaba's clan, photographed towards the end of the 19th century

Soshangane left with his followers and his younger brother Mhlabawadabuka for the eastern Lebombo foothills, till they reached the vicinity of upper Tembe river. Around 1825 Soshangane entered the country between Matsolo and Nkomati river where he found Zwangendaba Hlatswayo of the Jele clan, a former Ndwandwe subsidiary chief. They briefly formed an alliance, but due to Soshangane's ambition to establish his own kingdom this was short-lived. After trouble arose between Soshangane and his younger brother Mhlabawadabuka, Zwangendaba and his followers left for Vendaland, between Limpopo (Vembe) and Levubu (Ribvubye) rivers being joined by Mhlaba. They lived there for a while, before migrating to the North (Rozviland), near present-day Bulawayo. He defeated the Vashona. He later left for Manyikaland in the North east where he met Soshangane again in the early 1830s. They fled from Soshangane and Zwangendaba crossed the Zambezi river in 1835, after they split with Soshangane's young brother Mhlabawadabuka in 1834. Mhlabawadabuka remained in the Zambezi area. Mhlabawadabuka means the one who split the land, which led to the totem (Kwamulanyika). By 1825 Nxaba Msane, another former Ndwandwe general and subsidiary chief had entered central Mozambique, in the Sofala province. He ruled Sofala undisturbed for about 10 years, between 1825 and 1835. It was only in 1835 when he was removed by Soshangane. Nxaba left Sofala for Zambia. After defeating Nxaba, Soshangane lived for a while in Musapa in Zimbabwe, where he conquered the Ndau (Vandau) and Manyika (Vamanyika). Some Gazan Nguni lived in various Manyika regions in Zimbabwe, like the Zindi, Samanga, Nyamhuka, Karombe and Murahwa.

Soshangane then began to carve out a Nguni empire of conquest known as the Gaza Empire (or Gasa), named after his grandfather Gasa KaLanga, which would later significantly expand to cover areas over present day southern Mozambique, and parts of the Limpopo River around Mandlakazi. The rise of the Gaza Kingdom was based primarily on military conquests, particularly of the Vahlengwe, Vadjonga, Vahlave and Ndau peoples, who would be absorbed into the Nguni Gaza Kingdom. Soshangane then began a campaign to create a new language and culture named after himself. This began primarily with the formation of a regimented system in which different classes of the Gasa/Gaza kingdom were separated. The conquered Ndau, Vakhosa, and Vahlave peoples were regimented under the Mavulandlela regiment and taught Nguni/Ndwandwe battle tactics. Many of the subjugated peoples (including the Ndau, Shona, Nguni, and Tsonga) were incorporated into the Gaza empire. This created a conflict between the Shangaan tribe and the long-existing Tsonga people, where the Gaza Shangaan empire was seen as an invading force and a threat to the cultural institutions of the Tsonga people and other nearby tribes.

In 1828 Shaka sent a punitive expedition to liquidate his rival to the North, however suffering from malaria and food shortages they were easily defeated and Soshangane consolidated his empire.[1] Soshangane's army overran the Portuguese settlements at Delagoa Bay, Inhambane and Sena,[1] and he extracted tribute from the Europeans, primarily the Portuguese. After the death of Soshangane around 1856, Soshangane's empire was embroiled in succession disputes between his sons Mzila and Mawewe. The final ruler of Gaza kingdom was Soshangane's grandson Mdungazwe kaMzila who in 1895 was embroiled in war against the Chopi people and later defeated by the once tributary Portuguese leading the Nguni Gaza empire into decline. Soshangane is one of a number of prominent figures that rose to prominence during the Mfecane. The empire under Soshangane is credited for destroying Portuguese trading posts thus putting an end to slave trading that has been taking place before the arrival of the Nxumalo Ngunis.

The following events of the time were recorded: a) 22nd -27 October 1833 warriors of Gaza forced captain D A Riberiro and his men at Fort Espirito, Lourenco Marques, to evacuate and flee to the island Shefina (Bryant, 1929: 455); b) In 1828 warriors of Gaza defeated a Zulu army shortly before the assassination of Shaka, when it was still extremely difficult to resist Zulu military power (Dencoon, 1972: 37); c) 28 October 1833 warriors of Gaza destroyed the fort completely and put an end to slave trading that was taking place before his arrival. ( Bryant, 1929: 455); d) 3 November 1834 the Portuguese captain and all inhabitants, except 10 of the Inhambane settlement were destroyed (Bryant, 1929: 455); e) October 1836 : military command at Sofala, J N Da Costa and a whole garrison, rallied against Gaza and subsequently the garrison was wiped out ( Bryant ,1929: 455); f) Soshangana even commanded the Portuguese to recognize him as their king to whom they had to pay taxes. g) Soshangane formed the Gaza or Shangana Empire, which extended from just north of Delagoa Bay (Maputo), up the East Coast, as far as the Zambesi and Limpopo valleys; g) In his victorious progress he annihilated or drove into the sea all the Portuguese in his path, and it was he who destroyed Van Rensburg’s party of Voortrekkers on the south bank of the Limpopo (Shaka Zulu, 1955:152). h)In 1840s - 50s the Portuguese of Delegoa Bay, Inhambane, Sena districts and the chiefs of Barue and Manica were paying tribute (Newitt: 287); i) The Manika Kingdom was defeated and the Portuguese were forced to abandon their trading settlements there (Moyana H & Sibanda M, 1999:20); j) The Manika chiefs paid 100 head of cattle as acknowledgement of Gaza overlordship (Newitt: 287); i) Sena and Tete were brought under Shangane control and forced to pay tax; j) During Soshangana‘s reign, they paid no homage to the Portuguese at Delagoa Bay, Inhambane and Sofala, and demanded levy from all travellers passing through their territory e.g. before and after Arabs, Traders, British, Portuguese, Voortekkers and missionaries. All had to pay toll before being allowed to pass through the Gaza kingdom (Albasin, unpublished book, 1988); k) Even the young Joao Albasin paid the required tariff to Soshangana on his first journey through the Hlengwe bush to Zoutpansberg (Albasin, unpublished book, 1988); l) As the recognition of the Gaza kingdom Z.A.R granted Joao Albasin the area along the south of Levuvu River, stretching from Elim to the Mozambique border today, as the reserve for his many thousands Shangaans. It was officially known as the Knobneusen Location. Only Shangaans were allowed to settle in this area, with the exception of Davhane, the brother of Makhando, who had deserted his brother to seek sanctuary with Joao Albasin Albasin, unpublished book, 1988);

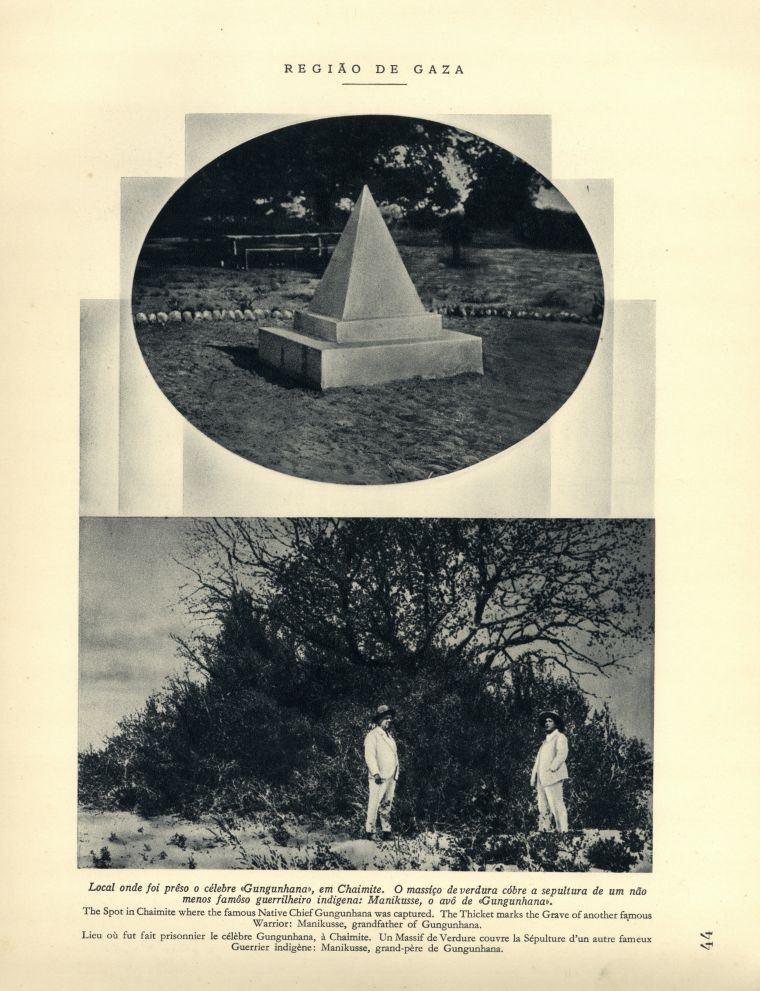
1929 Portuguese photo of the marker indicating where Gungunhana was captured by Mouzinho de Albuquerque (above) and of Soshanganes grave (below).

Due to cordial relations between Soshangana and another significant force at the time, that of the Ngwane King Mswati II, Soshangana stabilized the tension by presenting in marriage two of his daughters, Mahambandle and Nomagaca( Van Der Merwe), The last years of Soshangana s’ reign were spent in stabilising and enforcing his power by sending his regiments out as far as the Zambezi River on a yearly basis to collect taxes. Soshangana died in his residence near Chaimite (Shayimithi) on the lower Limpopo west of the present –day Chibuto where he was buried. (He died in 1858. He ruled the Gaza kingdom for 37 years: 1821-1858 (Liesegang, 1975:3). According to Bryant Soshangana‘s body /bones was taken to eTshaneni Mountain in Zululand where it was buried (Bryant, 1929: 45).

The Gaza Kingdom was stretching from close to the Nkomati River in the South to the Zambezi and Pungwe Rivers in the North and from the Indian Ocean in the East towards the Eastern parts of what today known as Zimbabwe- a total of approximately 240 000 km2 . According to Liesegang it seems as if he also incorporated the eastern Venda under his control (Liesegang, 1975:2; Myburgh 1949:75-76; Omer-Cooper 1988: 59-60 and Witt’s unpublished undated report). The Gaza Kingdom, which at height of its power may have controlled between 49 500-000 -1000-000 people, was one of the two Nguni states between the Limpopo and Zambezi Rivers (Carlos: 2005:1). Like other Nguni states, the Gaza Monarchy was unique, not in the way it provided an umbrella of sovereignty over tribute paying subjects, but in the sheer extent of its operations. At the height of its power in the 1850s and 1860s the direct authority of its rulers extended over the whole of what is today southern Mozambique and large parts of western Zimbabwe, eastern and northern Transvaal (Liesegang, 1975:1). The region of the Lebombo Mountains and the Zoutpansberg was situated on the edge of the area from which of Gaza Kingdom took tribute (Newitt, 1995:293).

In 1840s both Barue and Manica had been brought to acknowledge the overrule of Gaza king, Soahangana. Like other Nguni states, the Gaza Kingdom had centrally controlled and administered nucleus and a much larger “penumbra’ of territory where tribute was collected and Gaza overlordship was loosely acknowledges under the threat of being raided by Gaza impis. On its fringes, therefore, the “states” were loosely organized. Subject chieftaincies retained their identities and their traditional ruling dynasties, but had to accept the presence of their representatives of the Gaza state at their capital.

These chieftains were affiliated to one or other of the great aristocratic “houses” among which the patrimony of the Gaza Monarchy was distributed. Mention must be made that armed tax collecting parties representing these “houses”, periodically visited the outlying areas (Newitt:, 1973: 287). chieftains were affiliated to one or other of the great aristocratic “houses” among which the patrimony of the Gaza Monarchy was distributed. Mention must be made that armed tax collecting parties representing these “houses”, periodically visited the outlying areas (Newitt:, 1973: 287).

== Soshangana’s policy of administration ==
Soshangana handed over determined areas or chiefdoms to his sons and other close relatives. The subjects and the envoys of the chiefs would first go to these men when they had a problem which the king had to decide upon. This gave his sons, especially the older ones who could take part in discussions, political experience, a certain standing and a number of loyal followers. In this respect the Gaza Kingdom was markedly different from the Ndebele kingdom after 1850. Mzilikazi’s sons were known by some of the European visitors but they do not record any political activity. Portuguese records on the Gaza Nguni, especially those from Sofala, are very explicit on this point. So called court officials (i.e. those belonging to the house of the king and those of his ancestors) one of whom was often designated as prime minister in later English accounts, are also mentioned in reports on the Gaza Kingdom (Liesegang, 1975: 3). For military hegemony, the Gaza Nguni chiefs relied on regiments (called mangas or impis) which were commanded by indunas, or lieutenants. Modelled on Shaka’s regiments these organisations of professional soldiers, grouped by a toughened by rigorous training, dominated the local peasantry. Intermarriage with conquered Rhonga, Tonga and Chopi to expand their numbers diluted the Nguni ethnic distinctiveness. The Nguni overlords tried to offset the loss of homogeneity by requiring their subjects to adopt their customs, such as pierced earlobes. Not since the times of Mwene Mutapa dominance had a foreign invader overrun and subdued so much of the country below the Zambezi (Henriksen, 1978:77). The core of the state consisted of a number of aristocratic Nguni ‘houses’ associated with the past Gaza monarchs and their next of kin. These houses were endowed with the tribute from sections of the population. It was they who had the responsibility of collecting tribute and administering relations with subjects. The administrators of the houses were the most powerful of the Nguni aristocracy and had the right of attending the King’s council (Newitt, 1973: 297). The regimental structure was superficially similar to that of the Zulu. Some twenty–four age sets of regiments were formed during the existence of the state. They maintained an age–regiment system less tightly controlled than that of the Zulu, and dominated their subjects’ peoples under an elaborate hierarchical structure of status groups graded by lineages, in which the Ndwandwe royal lineage had precedence over their Tsonga, Ndau and Tonga subjects (Devenport, 1987: 68).

Soshangane using military tactics defeated most rivals and consolidated his control over the lands lying between the Zambezi and the Limpopo. In building his kingdom, Soshangane used the age–regiments system. The chiefs of conquered peoples were treated as vassal sub-chiefs. Young men were trained by military Indunas in the fighting methods of their conquerors. Members of the Nguni people constituted a distinct class called the ba Ngoni. The newly incorporated group of people were distinctly known as the Ba Tshangane. The new recruits were segregated against in regiments of their own under ‘ba Ngoni’ officers. As time went on, the ba Tshangane came to identify with their conquers and took pride in their loyalty to their king (Moyana H &Sibanda M, 1999:21). In order to govern more effectively, the ruling lineage devised a system of territorial apanages under royal siblings, which increased steadily and were re-divided after a civil conflict on the death of Soshangane in 1858, when Mzila beat his brother Mawewe for the succession (Devenport, 1987: 68 &, 1966:-59).

The regiments of the Gaza kingdom were not stationed in barracks and did not have their own headquarters or stocks of cattle. Their defeated young men were conscripted into Soshangane army. Many of them were recruited from among the Mavulandlela (i.e. those who sweep the road clean) and sent them ahead of his armies to remove all obstacles from the road. These young men were organised into regiments and used as advance guards during his marches (Junod, 1938). Soshangane incorporated later waves of refugees from the Zulu kingdom and maintains a tight regimental system, succeeded in dominating Mozambique, Transvaal as far as north as the Zambezi River and extracting tribute from the Portuguese settlements at Lourenco Marques and Sofala and from the Portuguese forts and the prazos on the Zambezi. But Soshangane was less successful than the Swazi rulers in assimilating conquered peoples and developing durable political institutions. Beyond the core of his kingdom on the Sabi River, his power depended on the presence of his regiments, which could not be everywhere at once (Curtin & others, 1978:306-308). The Gaza settled in Ndau country, east of the Sabi, and the Ndau language, a Shona dialect, contains a wealth of Zulu words inherited from the Gaza Ngunis. The conquered peoples who were not Shona included the Chopi, Thonga/Tsonga the Hlengwe and the Ronga however many separate tribes among these remained unconquered and many fled to other parts where they re-established their independence. The term ‘Shangaan’ which properly relates to the conquerors themselves, include all of those who were conquered. They contributed manpower to the Gaza army and the Ndau lost a high proportion of their men in this way. The Gaza intermarried with the local people, but were less successful in imposing their language on them as the Ndebele were doing in Matabeleland. Influence was not one way traffic. Whilst the local people learned much about from the Gaza, Zulu military technique, for instance, they in turn influenced the dominant group. Ndau beliefs took on a strong on the Shangaans (Gaza Nguni), just as the Ndebele took over the Mlimo concept from their Shona vassals (Warhurst, 1966:48). For the Shona, the growth of the Gaza state represented the latest in a series of far-flung empires that had engulfed their communities over the centuries. Soshangane largely usurped the role of his Rozwi predecessors rather than establishing a new political system. (Elkiss, 1981:66).

The Gaza rule was not at all harsh provided people did not rebel against it; any such rebellion was severely crushed. Soshangane ruled unchallenged from the Zambezi to the Limpopo, from the Sabi to the sea. He ruled the Gaza Empire for 37 years. He died at his capital Chaimiti in 1859 (Warhurst, 1966:48). The Gaza empire was however embroiled in the slave trade and the kingdom has been described by Harries as an exploitative governance. Another book by Gerhard Liesegang (1986) delves deeper into the activities of the Gaza Empire during Nghunghunyane's time and it points out the cruel nature of the Ngunis against the Shona, Kalanga, and Tsonga people. The book, titled "Nghunghunyani Nqumayo: Rei de Gaza 1884-1895 e o desaparecimento do seu estado" details how the Gaza Kingdom raided for slaves to sell to the Portuguese and various plantations, and how the local people came to hate the presence of the Gaza Empire in their land. The book also features descriptive interviews from people about those times, and it gives a clear overview of how the Gaza Kingdom was used as a vassal (or proxy) by foreign European governments in order to destabilize the region and to control it for its resources and slaves. With the oppression that the enslaved and exploited people suffered, it was this cause that led to the rebellion and war that finally led to a collaboration to destroy the hegemony of the Gaza Empire.

== Ndwandwe/Nxumalo lineage ==
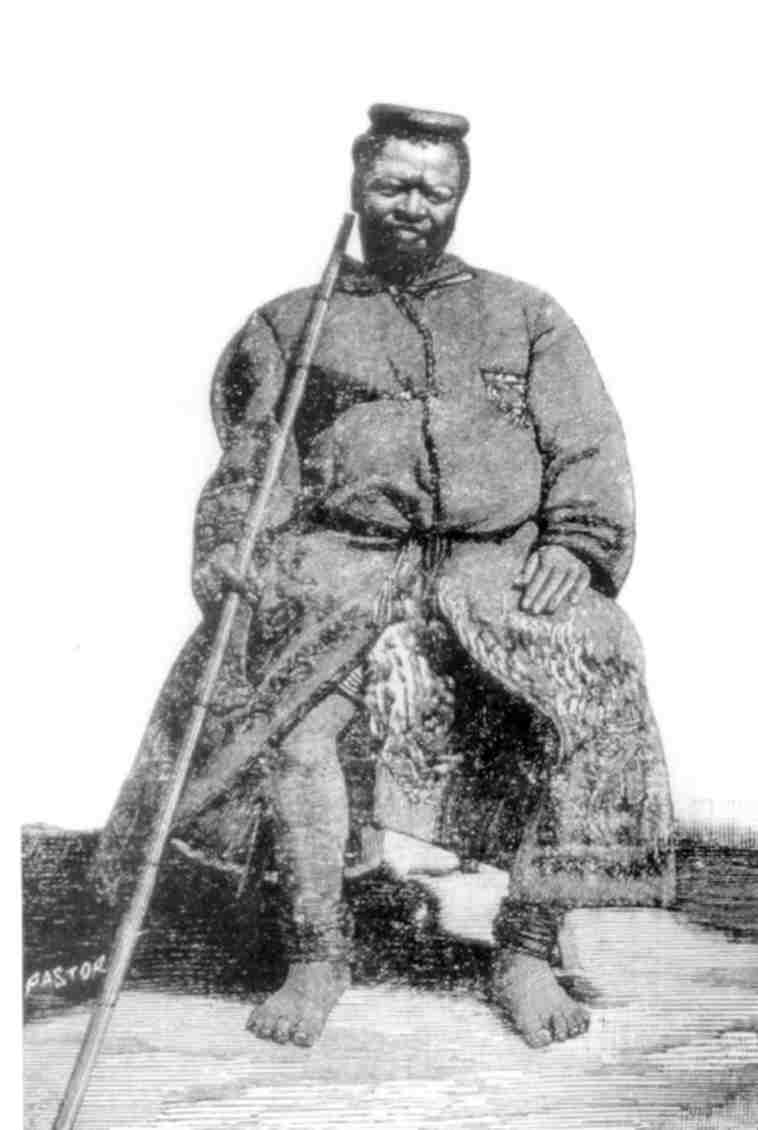
Chief Mdungazwe, grandson of Soshangane

Ludonga kaMavuso → Nxumalo → Ndwandwe kaNxumalo → Mkhatshwa kaNdwandwe → Manukuse kaMkhatshwa → Makweya kaManukuse → Gasa kaMakweya → Zikode kaGasa → Soshangane kaZikode → Mawewe → Mzila → Mdungazwe → Buyisonto → Mafemani → Mpisane → Abednigo "Impiyasendlini" kaMpisane Nxumalo (current incumbent)
