= Khumalo clan =

History of the Khumalo clan

The Khumalo are an African clan that originated in northern KwaZulu, South Africa. The Khumalos are part of a group of Zulus and Ngunis known as the Mntungwa. Others include the Blose and Mabaso and Zikode, located between the Ndwandwe and the Mthethwa. Their most famous issue was Mzilikazi and Mbulazi, an influential figure in the mfecane, and founder of the Northern Ndebele nation of Zimbabwe (mthwakazi)

== History ==
Until the rise of Zwide and the Ndwandwes, life was a simple affair and the Khumalos located at Mkhuze had the best that the land which would become Zululand had to offer: plenty of water, fertile soil and grazing ground. But the Khumalos in the early nineteenth century would have to lose their neutrality and choose a side, and this they postponed for as long as they could. To please the Ndwandwe, Mashobana – a Khumalo chief – married the daughter of the Ndwandwe chief Zwide and sired a son, Mzilikazi. The Ndwandwes are amaNguni aseMbo, though all spoke a very similar language (all Nguni languages are similar).

When Mashobane did not tell Zwide about patrolling Mthethwa amabutho (soldiers), Zwide had Mashobana killed, and the leadership of the Khumalo fell to Mzilikazi. Mzilikazi immediately did not trust his grandfather, Zwide, and took fifty warriors to join Shaka. Shaka was overjoyed because the Khumalos would be useful spies on Zwide and the Ndwandwes. After a few battles, Shaka gave Mzilikazi the extraordinary honour of being chief of the Khumalos and to remain semi-independent from the Zulu, if Zwide could be defeated.

This caused immense jealousy amongst those who had been with Shaka for many years, but as warriors none such as Shaka had realised their equal in Mzilikazi. All intelligence for the defeat of Zwide was collected by Mzilikazi. Hence, when Zwide was defeated Shaka rightly acknowledged he could not have done it without Mzilikazi and presented him with an ivory axe. There were only two such axes – one for Shaka and one for Mzilikazi. Shaka himself placed the plumes on Mzilikazi's head after Zwide was vanquished.

The Khumalos returned to peace in their ancestral homeland. This peace lasted until Shaka asked Mzilikazi to test a tribe to the north of the Khumalo, belonging to one Raninsi a Sotho. After the defeat of Raninsi, Mzilikazi refused to hand over the cattle to Shaka. Shaka, loving Mzilikazi, did nothing about it. His generals however, long disliking Mzilikazi, pressed for action, and thus a first force was sent to teach Mzilikazi a lesson. The force was soundly beaten by Mzilikazi's 500 warriors, compared to the Zulus' 3,000 warriors (though Mzilikazi had the cover of the mountains). This made Mzilikazi the only warrior to have ever defeated Shaka in battle. Mzilikazi was the soul King of the Ndebele the ultimate power and giver of power in the kingdom

Shaka did not seem to mind, but he reluctantly sent his veteran division, the Ufasimbi, to rid themselves of Mzilikazi and the embarrassing situation. Mzilikazi, left with only three hundred warriors who were grossly out-numbered, and betrayed by his brother, Zeni, who had wanted Mzilikazi's position for himself, was defeated.

From there the Khumalos would be scattered across southern Africa, some becoming the Sotho, and some joining other groups such as the Tswana, but the vast majority remained Zulu and Mthwakazi. "Mthwakazi" is what the Ndebeles call themselves. "Matabele" is a name originating from white settlers, itself coming from "Tebele", a name given to all Zulus by the Sotho at that time. The Ndebeles are Mthwakazi, drawing strength and wisdom from King Mzilikazi.

== See also ==
- Leleti Khumalo
