= Zwide kaLanga =

King of the Ndwandwe kingdom from c.1802 to 1820)

- Reign: 1802–1825
- Predecessor: King Langa KaXaba
- Successor: Kingdom collapsed after being defeated and fled during the Ndwandwe–Zulu War
- Born: c.1758 Zululand
- Died: 1825; Gauteng
- House: Ndwandwe
- Father: King Langa KaXaba

Location of Zwide's kraal, kwaNongoma, on a map of KwaZulu-Natal

Zwide kaLanga (c. 1758–1825) was the king of the Ndwandwe (Nxumalo) nation from about 1805 to around 1820. He was the son of Langa KaXaba, a Nxumalo king.

== Political life ==
Around the time Zwide became king, the Ndwandwe were growing in military power. Ambitious in expanding Ndwandwe supremacy, Zwide was a prominent rival to Dingiswayo, king of the Mthethwa and his famous general and protégé, Shaka kaSenzangakhona, the founder of the Zulu Kingdom.

== Military actions ==
Zwide sought to expand his borders, and in 1818 he destroyed the power of the Mthethwa Kingdom, after he had King Dingiswayo killed. He also had a battle with the young Zulu clan at the Battle of Gqokli Hill.

He destroyed and overran the neighbouring Khumalo Kingdom and executed their king, Matshobana KaMangete. Mashobana's son and heir Mzilikazi escaped from the Nxumalo and sought refuge with Shaka, who had reformed the remnant Mthethwa clan under his rule.

Knowing this, Zwide planned to destroy the Zulu Empire to secure Ndwandwe domination of Zululand. In 1820, he led his army into battle against the Zulu at the Battle of Mhlatuze River. His forces were caught crossing halfway across the Mhlatuze River when the Zulu forces attacked, and the Nxumalo army was scattered. Zwide escaped with a remnant of his clan across the Pongola River.

After Zwide and his clansmen escaped, the Zulu attacked the rest of his people, killing many at Mome Gorge, a desolate place. The Zulu attacked the Ndwandwe capital, KwaNongoma. The Zulu victory was predated by Zwide's scattering of the Mfekane tribe which gave the impression that Shaka's victory was the beginning of the Mfecane or the scattering. Zwide's generals fled north, where they established their own kingdoms, such as the Gaza Empire in Gaza, formed by Soshangane.
