= Ngoni Kingdom =

Ngoni Kingdom may refer to:

- Jere Ngoni Kingdom, a precolonial state in modern-day Malawi that was initially led by Zwangendaba and later M'mbelwa
- Other Jere Ngoni polities that formed after the Jere Ngoni's fragmentation following Zwangendaba's death
- Maseko Ngoni Kingdom, a precolonial state in modern-day Malawi initially led by Ngwane Maseko (separate from the Jere Ngoni)
