= Mfecane =

1815–1840 period of civil conflict in southern Africa

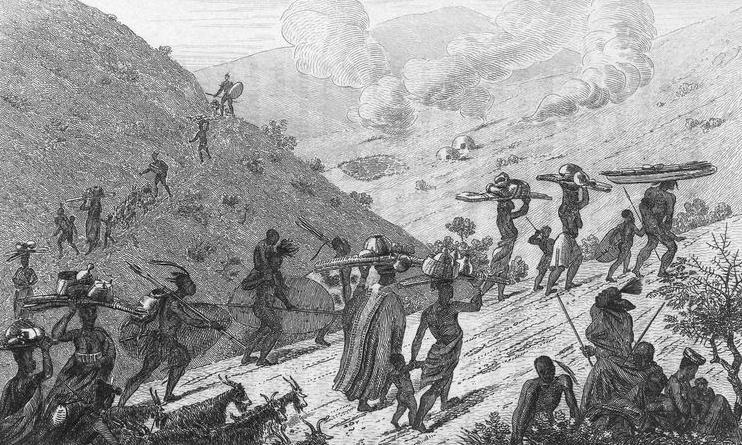
An early painting of the first migration of the Fengu, one of the affected peoples of the Mfecane

The Mfecane (Note: Also known by the Tshivenda name Mushavho and the Sesotho names Difaqane or Lifaqane (all meaning 'crushing', 'scattering', 'forced dispersal', or 'forced migration').) was a historical period of heightened military conflict and migration associated with state formation and expansion in Southern Africa. It resulted from the complex interplay of pre-existing trends of political centralisation with the effects of international trade, environmental instability, and European colonisation. The exact range of dates that comprise the Mfecane varies between sources. At its broadest, the period lasted from the late eighteenth century to the mid-nineteenth century, but scholars often focus on an intensive period from the 1810s to the 1840s.

Traditional estimates for the death toll range from 1 million to 2 million; however, these numbers are controversial, and some recent scholars revise the mortality figure significantly downwards and attribute the root causes to complex political, economic, and environmental developments. The Mfecane is significant in that it saw the formation of new states, institutions, and ethnic identities in southeastern Africa.

The Mfecane's historiography itself is also historically significant, with different versions having been employed to serve a range of political purposes since its inception as a historical concept. The label first emerged in the 1830s and blamed the disruption on the actions of King Shaka, who was alleged to have waged near-genocidal wars that depopulated the land and sparked a chain reaction of violence as fleeing groups sought to conquer new lands. Since the latter half of the 20th century, this interpretation has fallen out of favour among scholars due to a lack of historical evidence.

== Causes ==
The Mfecane resulted from the complex interplay of pre-existing trends of political centralisation with the effects of international trade, environmental instability, and European colonisation. State formation and expansion had already been intensifying in Southeastern Africa as of at least the late 1700s, but these processes were greatly accelerated after the international ivory trade opened. The trade allowed leaders to amass unprecedented amounts of wealth, which they could then use to cultivate greater political power. Wealth and power became mutually reinforcing, as wealth enabled leaders to develop state instruments of control and expropriation, which they used to extract further wealth through taxation and military action. The consequence of this cycle was an increasing political and wealth disparity within and between polities, particularly in concern to productive land and food stores.

Political centralisation became problematic in the early 19th century when deep drought (aggravated by the atmospheric effects of volcanic eruptions in 1809 and 1815) struck Southeastern Africa. Whereas previous droughts had not caused serious famine, the unequal distribution of land and food stores lessened the ability of average people to meet their needs. Though far less susceptible to famine, leaders faced threats to their power as (taxable) agricultural production dropped and ivory became scarcer due to overhunting. Faced with the challenges of fighting famine and maintaining wealth flows, leaders were incentivised to turn to raiding and conquest. Conquest protected conquering peoples against famine by providing immediate access to the conquered peoples' livestock and grain stores and, in the long term, by securing arable land and the people (particularly women) to farm it at greater intensities than before. Here another self-reinforcing cycle set in as famine and warfare promoted insecurity and militarism, which promoted political centralisation and more warfare as strong leaders expanded their authority by offering a desperately-needed escape from famine to loyal followers.

A second stage of turmoil from the 1820s to the 1830s was driven in large part by slave and cattle raiding by Griqua, Basters, and other Khoekhoe-European groups armed and mounted by European settlers, who benefitted from trading their plunder. The increasing economic pull of the international slave trade also incentivised greater warfare and disruption between polities close to international ports such as Delagoa Bay.

== The Mfecane in the East ==
The Mfecane began in eastern Southern Africa with increasing competition and political consolidation as chiefdoms vied for control over trade routes and grazing land.

Delagoa Bay and its international port saw increasing regional conflict in the mid-to-late 18th century. The local Tembe and Mabhudu-Tembe competed for control, absorbing or expelling some of their neighbouring polities. The abakwaDlamini, who would later form the Swazi Kingdom, were one such group put to flight by the conflict.

The mid-to-late 18th century also saw the rise of the Nxumalo and Nyambose chiefdoms between the Phongolo and Thukela rivers, which would eventually become the Ndwandwe Paramountcy and Mthethwa Paramountcy respectively. On the borders of their spheres of influence were the amaHlubi of the upper Mzinyathi, the abakwaDlamini north of the Phongolo, and the abakwaQwabe of the lower Thukela. The latter's rise displaced elements of the abakwaCele, abakwaKhomo and amaThuli further south. The amaThuli managed to secure a sizeable chiefdom between the lower Mngeni and Mkhomazi Rivers, which displaced local groups across the Mzimkhulu River. This in turn contributed to the rise of the Mpondo Kingdom.

The 1810s saw the continued expansion of the Ndwandwe and Mthethwa Paramountcies, as well as the Portuguese Delagoa Bay slave trade. The Ndwandwe Paramountcy came to blows with the Mthethwa in the late 1810s, ultimately defeating and slaying their leader Dingiswayo kaJobe. The Mthethwa promptly collapsed as its subjects reasserted independence. The Ndwandwe king Zwide kaLanga went to war with one of these breakaway polities, the amaZulu of Shaka kaSenzangakhona. Their raids and counterraids proved costly and indecisive, contributing to the breakup of the Ndandwe Paramountcy. Groups broke away under Soshangane and Zwangendaba who settled their followers in the Delagoa Bay region, while Msane did the same in what is now eastern Eswatini. King Zwide, now in a position of weakness, withdrew to his territories north of the Phongolo to rebuild. Shaka took advantage of the power vacuum to expand the Zulu state to the Mkhuze River. The 1810s also saw the expansion of British colonial rule in southeastern southern Africa, with Xhosa polities displaced northwards by the Fourth and Fifth Xhosa Wars.

Meanwhile, between the Mzimkhulu and Mzimvubu Rivers, some groups fleeing the upheavals further north joined Faku kaNgqungqushe's Mpondo Kingdom, while most others instead vied for dominance just outside of its reach.

By the 1820s, Shoshangane's Gaza Kingdom and Shaka's Zulu kingdom had established themselves (alongside the remains of the Ndwandwe Paramountcy) as the major players in the Northeast of Southern Africa. After relocating once again to the Nkomati River region, Zwide' Ndwandwe successfully raided and recruited their way back to prominence. By the time of his death in 1825 the Ndwandwe had muscled into the interior, possibly sundering the Pedi Kingdom and certainly dominating the region between the Olifants and Phongolo Rivers. Msane, Zwangendaba, and the followers of Nxaba, for their part, were displaced farther north. The Gaza Kingdom expanded to the northeast, heavily raiding small Tsonga polities. Slave trading expanded at Delagoa Bay, and the Portuguese worked to expand their regional sphere of influence.

In 1826, the expansion of the Ndwandwe Paramountcy under Sikhunyana began to threaten the Zulu Kingdom's borders. In response, Shaka marched his army (and allied British traders) to the Izindololwane Hills and put Sikhunyana to flight. Their victory was so total that the Ndwandwe state collapsed shortly thereafter, with some constituent polities fleeing south or joining the Zulu, the Gaza Kingdom, or Mzilikazi's Matabele/Ndebele Kingdom. The collapse of the Ndwandwe allowed Sekwati to rebuild the sundered Pedi Kingdom around a fortified hilltop base near the Steelpoort River. From this stronghold, he soon gathered a large following by offering protection to refugees.

In 1827, Shoshangane relocated the Gaza Kingdom from the lower Nkomati to the lower Limpopo River area. The Gaza defeated a Zulu army in 1828 and developed economic and political ties with the Portuguese.

In May of 1828, Shaka launched a successful cattle raid against the Bomvana and the Mpondo Kingdom, following up with another raid north of Delagoa Bay before the first expeditionary force had returned home. Sensing political weakness, his brothers Dingane and Mhlangana assassinated him in September. Dingane subsequently purged Mhlangana and other political rivals, establishing himself as the new Zulu king. These chaotic events prompted the secession of a segment of the subject abakwaQwabe nation, though they were dispersed in late 1829 by a Mpondo attack south of the Mzimkhulu.

By the late 1820s the power struggles between the Mzimkhulu and Mzimvubu Rivers had produced two victors: the Mpondo Kingdom and the Bhaca Chiefdom. Several weaker polities again relocated, with some moving north, others moving south, and yet others to the Zulu Kingdom. 1828 saw a further advance of colonial power as a combined British-Boer force marched far beyond the colonial borders and destroyed Matiwane's amaNgwane at Mbholompo.

Benefitting from the fall of the Ndwandwe and Shaka, Sobhuza's Swazi Kingdom expanded from the core of modern Eswatini to the Sabie River by the early 1830s. In an 1833 trade dispute, Zulu forces briefly captured Delagoa Bay and executed the Portuguese governor. In an attempt to solidify their control over inland trade, the Portuguese launched a failed attack on the Gaza Kingdom in 1834, leaving Gaza dominant over Delagoa Bay and the territories to its north. By the late 1830s, the Kingdom's sphere of influence reached as far as the Zambezi River.

In 1836, the Swazi Kingdom weathered a joint attack by Zulu forces and British adventurers. Sometime in the late 1830s the Swazi launched a raid against the Pedi Kingdom, which repelled them.

== The Mfecane in the Interior ==
The Mfecane began in the interior regions of Central Southern Africa in the late 18th century with the displacement of Khoekhoe and San peoples by slave and cattle raiders from the expanding Dutch Cape Colony. Arriving in the middle and lower Orange River regions, they competed with local Batswana, beginning a period of social breakdown and recombination. Bolstered in number by escaped slaves, bandits, and people of all ethnicities from the Cape Colony, some of these peoples would eventually become the Korana. Their power increased as trade with and raids upon colonists provided guns and horses, and by the 1780s they began raiding northwards against Tswana polities.

From the 1780s to the turn of the century, the southern Tswana chiefdoms underwent fragmentations and consolidations as raids and counter-raids proliferated. The powerful Bahurutshe Chiefdom of the upper Marico River region had their control of the lucrative trade with the Cape Colony eroded by the Bangwaketse to the northwest, the Batlhaping to the southwest, and the emerging Pedi Kingdom to the east. The latter, helmed by the Maroteng clan, also came into conflict with the amaNdzundza Ndebele, Masemola, Magakala, Bamphahlele, and Balobedu polities. Meanwhile, the region of the modern north and central Free State was increasingly coming under the control of the Bataung.

In the late 1790s, expansion by the Cape Colony to the lower Orange River region displaced the mixed-race Griqua peoples to the confluence of the Vaal and Orange River. There, they absorbed some of their San and Korana neighbours as clients. The Griqua, like other ethnic groups, were not politically unified and differed in their livelihood strategies, which ranged from raiding to agriculture to controlling trade between Batswana and the Cape Colony.

By the turn of the century amaXhosa groups also began arriving in the middle Orange River region, fleeing instability along the eastern Cape Colony frontier. There they absorbed Korana, San, and others and engaged in extensive raiding along the Orange and lower Vaal rivers. This proved particularly damaging to the trade activities of their Batlhaping victims.

By the 1810s, Boer expansion brought increasing destabilisation to the middle Orange River region, not least in that it increased the flow of firearms. The Caledon Valley was now sustaining raids by Boer, Griqua, and Korana parties. By the early 1820s the instability spread north of the Orange River.

In 1822 AmaHlubi under the command of Mpangazita crossed the Drakensberg mountains and attacked Queen MmaNthatisi's Batlôkwa people. Put to flight, MmaNthatisi's followers survived off of pillage before resettling west of the Caledon River in 1824. The Sotho polities of this area sometimes held conflictual relations with these Batlôkwa newcomers, and they began coalescing in 1824 under the leadership of Moshoeshoe.

Separately, facing violence and starvation, Sebetwane's BaFokeng, Tsooane's MaPhuting, and Nkarahanye's BaHlakoana fled their homes. The three joined forces in 1823 to take the BaThlaping town of Dithakong, whose access to water kept it rich in grain and cattle despite the overall drought. The BaThlaping repelled the invasion on 24 June with the aid of a mounted force of Griqua, inflicting heavy casualties and killing Tsooane and Nkarahanye.

In 1825, Mpangazita's followers dispersed after he was killed in a war against Matiwane's amaNgwane. The amaNgwane proceeded to control much of the Caledon River environs, raiding and displacing Sotho and Tswana neighbours.

The mid-1820s saw Sebetwane dominate the upper Molopo region and Moletsane's Bataung people heavily raid the Vaal River. The eastern interior, however, was coming under the domination of Mzilikazi's Ndebele Kingdom. His forces raided the Venda Kingdom to the north, the Maroteng, amaNdzundza, and Balodebu to the northeast, the Bangwaketse to the far west, and Matiwane's nation in the Caledon Valley. Sebetwane and Moletsane's nations, for their part, were outright put to flight.

Between 1827 and 1828 Matiwane's amaNgwane launched a failed attack on Moshoeshoe and, after suffering a major raid (likely perpetrated by the Ndebele), relocated to abaThembu territory in 1828, where they were destroyed by British, Boer, amaGcaleka, amaMpondo, and abaThembu forces. Though Matiwane was repelled, Moshoeshoe's forces successfully raided the abaThembu in 1829, greatly enriching his kingdom and allowing it to recruit large numbers of followers from returning refugees. To the south of Moshoeshoe's territory, small San polities eked out independent livelihoods, while others joined Morosi's Phuthi polity to raid abaThembu, Cape Colonists, and others. Notably, San groups developed new styles of rock art during this period of change.

Also between 1827 and 1828, Mzilikazi's Ndebele relocated to the Magaliesberg mountains, where he subjugated the Bahurutshe, Bakwena, and Bakgatla and regularly raided the Bangwaketse and southern Batswana peoples. A multi-ethnic force under the Kora leader Jan Bloem sought to profit from the Ndebele's wealth with a mid-1828 raid, which proved only a partial success as his Kora and Griqua parties were destroyed before they could escape. By 1830, the Ndebele had extended their political influence over the western Tswana polities. Mzilikazi suffered another major raid from the Griqua leader Barend Barends in 1831, but again managed to decimate the loot-laden attackers. In 1832 it was the Zulu Kingdom's turn to raid the Ndebele, but for the most part they were successfully repelled. Mzilikazi relocated after the Zulu attack, settling in the Bahurutshe's upper Marico territory. The Bahurutshe response was divided, with some submitting to Ndebele rule and others relocating to Bathlaping and Griqua territory. In 1834 Jan Bloem launched a second raid against the Ndebele, which ended similarly to his first attack. Mzilikazi responded by maintaining the southern reaches of his domain as an unpopulated buffer zone.

== Consequences for Nguni societies ==
This map illustrates the rise of the Zulu Empire under Shaka (1816–1828) in present-day South Africa. The rise of the Zulu Empire under Shaka forced other chiefdoms and clans to flee across a wide area of southern Africa. Clans fleeing the Zulu war zone included the Soshangane, Zwangendaba, Ndebele, Hlubi, Ngwane, and the Mfengu. .

Around 1821, the Zulu general Mzilikazi of the Khumalo clan defied Shaka, and set up his own kingdom. He quickly made many enemies: not only the Zulu king, but also the Boers, and the Griqua and Tswana. Defeats in several clashes convinced Mzilikazi to move north towards Swaziland. Going north and then inland westward along the watershed between the Vaal and the Limpopo rivers, Mzilikazi and his followers, the AmaNdebele, (called Matebele in English) established a Ndebele state northwest of the city of Pretoria.

During this period, the Matebele left a trail of destruction in their wake. From 1837 to 1838, the arrival of Boer settlers and the subsequent battles of Vegtkop and Mosega, drove the Matebele north of the Limpopo. They settled in the area now known as Matabeleland, in present-day southern Zimbabwe. Mzilikazi set up his new capital in Bulawayo. The AmaNdebele drove the MaShona of the region northward and forced them to pay tribute. This caused resentment that has continued to the current day in modern Zimbabwe.

At the Battle of Mhlatuze River in 1818, the Ndwandwe were defeated by a Zulu force under the direct command of Shaka. Soshangane, one of Zwide's generals, fled to Mozambique with the remainder of the Ndwandwe. There, they established the Gaza kingdom. They oppressed the Tsonga people living there, some of whom fled over the Lebombo Mountains into the Northern Transvaal. In 1833, Soshangane invaded various Portuguese settlements, and was initially successful. But a combination of internal disputes and war against the Swazi caused the downfall of the Gaza kingdom.

The Ngwane people lived in present-day Eswatini (Swaziland), where they had settled in the southwest. They warred periodically with the Ndwandwe and the Tembe.

Zwangendaba, a commander of the Ndwandwe army, fled north with Soshangane after his defeat in 1819. Zwangendaba's followers were henceforth called Ngoni. Continuing north of the Zambezi River, they formed a state in the region between lakes Malawi and Tanganyika. Maseko, who led another part of the Ngoni people, founded another state to the east of Zwangendaba's kingdom.

To the east, refugee clans and tribes from the Mfecane fled to the lands of the Xhosa people. Some of them such as the amaNgwane were driven back by force and defeated. Those who were accepted were obliged to be tributary to the Xhosas and lived under their protection. They were assimilated into the Xhosa cultural way of life, becoming part of the Xhosa people. After years of oppression by the Xhosas, they later formed an alliance with the Cape Colony.

== Consequences for the Sotho-Tswana peoples ==
Southern Tswana populations had experienced an increase in conflict as early as the 1780s. There was significant population growth in the region which lead to more competition for resources. There was an increasing amount of trade with the Cape colony and the Portuguese; this had the consequence of separate chiefdoms becoming more eager to conquer land for themselves in order to control trade routes. Dutch settlers from the Cape Colony encroaching upon the Khoikhoi and San into regions where Tswana people live resulted in the formation of the Korana who started to launch raids on other communities by the 1780s. The fact that many of them had access to firearms and horses likely exacerbated the devastation caused by their raiders. Xhosa who were escaping the already violent region of the Eastern Cape often launched their own raids as well. All of these events led to making the region progressively more unstable. Missionary interference, internal politics, and raids by Dutch settlers also impacted the region. By the start of the 19th century, the most powerful Tswana chiefdom, the Bahurutse, were increasingly being challenged by the Bangwaketse.

Moshoeshoe I gathered the mountain clans together in an alliance against the Zulus. Fortifying the easily defended hills and expanding his reach with cavalry raids, he fought against his enemies with some success, despite not adopting the Zulu tactics, as many clans had done. The territory of Moshoeshoe I became the kingdom of Lesotho.

The Tswana were pillaged by two large invading forces set on the move by the Mfecane. Sebetwane gathered the Bafokeng of Patsa, who are part of the Basotho and were later to be called Kololo ethnic groups near modern Lesotho and wandered north across what is now Botswana, plundering and killing many of the Tswana people in the way. They also took large numbers of captives north with them, finally settling north of the Zambezi River in Barotseland, where they conquered the Lozi people. The next force was the Mzilikazi and the Matebele who moved across Tswana territory in 1837. Both of these invading forces continued to travel north across Tswana territory without establishing any sort of state. In addition to these major kingdoms, a number of smaller groups also moved north into Tswana territory, where they met with defeat and ultimately vanished from history. Among those involved in these invasions were European adventurers such as Nathaniel Isaacs (who was later accused of slave trading).

== Controversy ==
In 1988, Rhodes University professor Julian Cobbing advanced a different hypothesis on the rise of the Zulu state; he contended the accounts of the Mfecane were a self-serving, constructed product of apartheid-era politicians and historians. According to Cobbing, apartheid-era historians had mischaracterised the Mfecane as a period of internally induced Black-on-Black destruction. Instead, Cobbing argued that the roots of the conflicts lay in the labour needs of Portuguese slave traders operating out of Delagoa Bay, Mozambique and European settlers in the Cape Colony. The resulting pressures led to forced displacement, famine, and war in the interior, allowing waves of Afrikaner settlers to colonise large swaths of the region. Cobbing's views were echoed by historian Dan Wylie, who argued that colonial-era white writers such as Isaacs had exaggerated the brutality of the Mfecane to justify European colonialism.

Cobbing's hypothesis generated an immense volume of polemics among historians; the discussions were termed the "Cobbing Controversy". While historians had already embarked upon new approaches to the study of the Mfecane in the 1970s and 1980s, Cobbing's paper was the first major source that overtly defied the hegemonic "Zulu-centric" explanation at the time. This was followed by fierce discourse in the early 1990s prompted by Cobbing's hypothesis. Many agree that Cobbing's analysis offered several key breakthroughs and insights into the nature of early Zulu society.

The historian Elizabeth Eldredge challenged Cobbing's thesis on the grounds that there is scant evidence of the resumption of the Portuguese slave trade out of Delagoa Bay before 1823, a finding that undermines Cobbing's thesis that Shaka's early military activities were a response to slave raids. Moreover, Eldredge argues that the Griqua and other groups (rather than European missionaries as asserted by Cobbing) were primarily responsible for the slave raids coming from the Cape. Eldredge also asserts that Cobbing downplays the importance of the ivory trade in Delagoa Bay, and the extent to which African groups and leaders sought to establish more centralised and complex state formations to control ivory routes and the wealth associated with the trade. She suggests these pressures created internal movements, as well as reactions against European activity, that drove the state formations and concomitant violence and displacement. She still agreed with Cobbing's overall sentiment in that the Zulu-centric explanation for the Mfecane is not reliable. By the early 2000s, a new historical consensus had emerged, recognising the Mfecane to be not simply a series of events resulting from the founding of the Zulu Kingdom but rather a multitude of factors caused before and after Shaka Zulu came into power.

The debate and controversy within Southern African historiography over the Mfecane has been compared to similar debates about the Beaver Wars of the seventeenth century in northeastern North America, due to the alleged similarity of the narratives of indigenous "self-vanishing" that were propagated by apologists for European colonialism about the Mfecane and the Beaver Wars.

== See also ==
- Angolan Wars
  - Imbangala
- Prazo da coroa
  - Chikunda
  - Prazeiros
- Guaraní War
  - Bandeirantes
- Mississippian shatter zone
  - Indian slave trade in the American Southeast
- Pays d'en Haut
  - Beaver Wars
  - Fox Wars

== Sources ==
- Eldredge, Elizabeth A. (1992). "Sources of Conflict in Southern Africa, c. 1800–30: The 'Mfecane' Reconsidered". The Journal of African History. 33 (1): 1–35. doi:10.1017/S0021853700031832. ISSN 0021-8537. JSTOR 182273. S2CID 153554467. Archived from the original on 3 February 2022.
- Epprecht, Marc (June 1994). "The Mfecane as Teaching Aid: History, Politics, and Pedagogy in Southern Africa". Journal of Historical Sociology. 7 (2): 113–130. doi:10.1111/j.1467-6443.1994.tb00164.x.
- Wright, John (1989). "Political Mythology and the Making of Natal's Mfecane". Canadian Journal of African Studies. 23 (2). doi:10.2307/485525. hdl:10539/10253. JSTOR 485525.
- Wright, John (2009). "Turbulent Times: Political Transformations in the North and East, 1760s–1830s". In Mbenga, Bernard K.; Hamilton, Carolyn; Ross, Robert (eds.). The Cambridge History of South Africa. Cambridge History of South Africa. Vol. 1: From Early Times to 1885. Cambridge: Cambridge University Press. pp. 211–252. ISBN 978-0-521-51794-2.

== Further resources ==
- J. D. Omer-Cooper, The Zulu Aftermath: A Nineteenth-Century Revolution in Bantu Africa, Longmans, 1978: ISBN 0-582-64531-X
- Norman Etherington, The Great Treks: The Transformation of Southern Africa, 1815–1854, Longman, 2001: ISBN 0-582-31567-0
- Carolyn Hamilton, The Mfecane Aftermath: Reconstructive Debates in Southern African History, Pietermaritzburg: University of Natal Press, 1995: ISBN 1-86814-252-3
