= Ndau =

Ndau may refer to:

- Ndau people
- Ndau language
