= Makhanya =

Makhanya is a surname. Notable people with the surname include:

- Sibusisiwe Violet Makhanya (1894–1971), first black South African social worker
- Joseph Makhanya (born 1981), South African footballer
- Leonard Makhanya (born 1964), Swazi boxer
- Mapaseka Makhanya (born 1985), South African middle and long-distance runner
- Mondli Makhanya, South African journalist
- Sibonelo Makhanya (born 1996), South African cricketer
- Thoko Remigia Makhanya, South African anti-apartheid activist, environmental advocate and poet

== See also ==
- Makhanya v Minister of Finance
