= Battle of Gqokli Hill =

1818 battle of the Ndwandwe–Zulu War

- Part of Ndwandwe–Zulu War
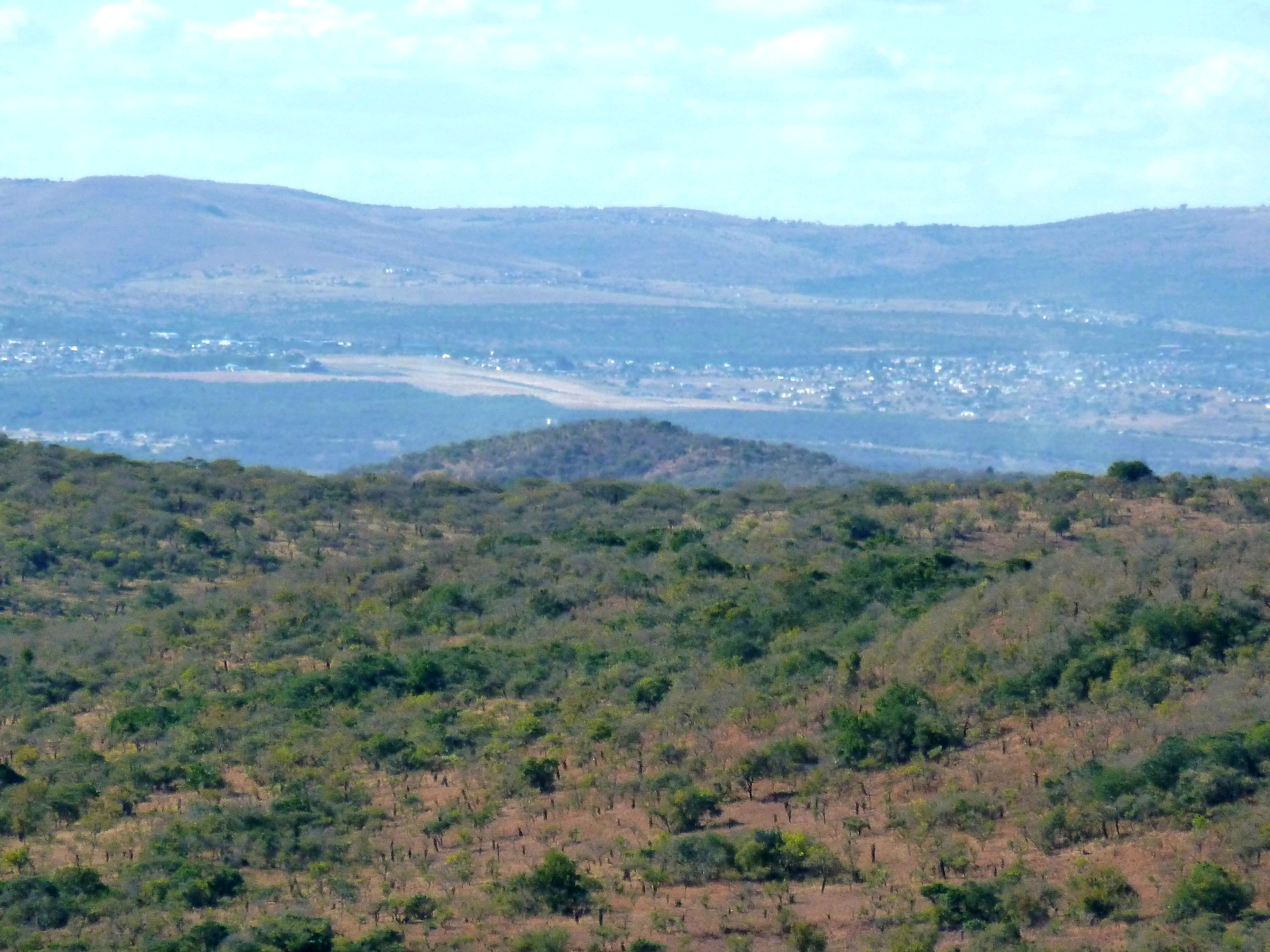
- Gqokli hill seen from eMakhosini, with Ulundi in the background
Date	April 1818
Location	Gqokli Hill, South Africa
Result	Zulu victory

Belligerents
Zulu and allies	Ndwandwe

Commanders and leaders
Shaka	Nomahlanjana

Strength
5,000 (est w allies)	12,000 (est)

Casualties and losses
2,000 killed and wounded	7,500 killed and wounded

The Battle of Gqokli Hill has been claimed by some to have occurred on or around April 1818, a part of the Ndwandwe-Zulu War between Shaka of the Zulu nation and Zwide of the Ndwandwe just south of present-day Ulundi ( 28° 22' 23" S 31° 21' 15.77" E). However, some claim that the battle never actually happened.

== Background ==
The Zulus were originally a close-knit ethnic group community that had migrated to the eastern plateau of present-day South Africa; they became a strong tribal nation largely due to the efforts of an ambitious King named Shaka (c. 1787–1828, reigned 1816–1828). A rebellious young man, Shaka was estranged from his father, who was a Zulu King named Senzangakhona, and became a warrior with the Mthethwa people. The Mthethwa paramount Kingdom Dingiswayo helped Shaka become recognized as head of the Zulus after Senzangakhona died in 1816. The two Kingdoms were close friends, and their warriors fought together against common enemies, such as the Ndwandwe headed by King Zwide. After Dingiswayo was captured and executed by Zwide, the Mthethwa people placed themselves under Shaka and took the Zulu name. Shaka revolutionized traditional ways of fighting by introducing the iklwa, a short stabbing spear, as a weapon and by organizing warriors into disciplined units that fought in close formation behind large cowhide shields.

== Alleged battle ==
The popular account of the battle goes roughly as follows. In spite of being significantly outnumbered, masterful strategy and tactics won the battle for Shaka. To delay the Ndwandwe invasion army, under command of Zwide's eldest son and heir, Nomahlanjana, Shaka posted forces along the drifts (fords) of the White Umfolozi River to delay the enemy while the river was still relatively high. Meanwhile, he laid waste to the area on the south (Zulu) side the river, and moved most of his clan's noncombatants and cattle into hiding in the Nkandla Forest, on the southern extremities of Zulu land. He then placed the bulk of his troops around the top of Gqokli hill, with a reserve and all his supplies out of sight in a depression at the top of the hill. To Nomahlanja, it seemed like a much smaller force of Zulus at the top of the hill and he anticipated it would be an easy massacre, "Like butchering cattle in a kraal," he is reputed to have said.

Before the Ndwandwe army was across the river and surrounding his hilltop position, Shaka dispatched about 700 from his small army, with a fraction of the clan's cattle herd, to make a display about ten kilometers south of Gqokli and tempt Nomahlanjana to split his force to capture them. The Ndwandwe general, thinking he was seeing the entire Zulu herd and half their army, obliged by sending four regiments (about 4,000 men) off to chase the cattle down.

By about nine o'clock in the morning, once all eight of the remaining Ndwandwe regiments (about 8,000) were arrayed at the bottom of Gqokli Hill, Nomahlanjana gave the signal for the attack. In the first charge up the slopes, it quickly became apparent that the Ndwandwe superiority in numbers would actually be a hindrance, for the converging formations began to crowd into each other, making it difficult to throw their spears effectively. And when Shaka ordered a counter-attack, his men, who had no throwing spears (assegai) but were armed with the new, shorter, stabbing assegai (amaKlwa), charged downhill and routed the packed mob of Ndwandwes.

Nomahlanjana perceived that his confidence was premature. He correctly reasoned that the problem presented by the Zulu's central hilltop position, and the congestion that caused in his own forces, needed more thoughtful, flexible tactics. As many as five attacks were made during the day, each one trying a slightly different technique. But all failed to overwhelm the perceptibly small band of Zulus.

The Ndwandwe commander was also aware that his men, who had drunk all of their carried water, were becoming thirsty and exhausted in the hot, dry weather. They were starting to slip away in increasing numbers to make their way back to the nearest water, the Umfolozi river, about two kilometers from the battlefield. Shaka's men, by contrast and thanks to his foresight, had plenty of water, food and first aid supplies in the depression on top of the summit, so were not nearly so taxed by the weather.

Shaka had earlier arranged for the decoy force to the south to signal him with smoke when the 4,000 Ndwandwes on the cattle raiding expedition were heading back. Just after the fourth Ndwandwe attack had been repulsed, Shaka saw the smoke signal to the south. That meant he had very little time left to destroy Nomahlanjana's main army before it was reinforced.

Both sides had suffered casualties during the day, the Ndwandwes in greater proportion than the Zulus (due, it has been claimed by Zulu oral tradition, to the superior weapons, discipline, and fighting techniques implemented by Shaka). But Nomahlanjana calculated, based on the thinning ranks of the four Zulu regiments he could see on the hill, that he still had a vastly superior force. He also concluded that the Zulus must be getting as hot, tired and thirsty as his own men (not aware of their ability to refresh themselves on the hilltop). He decided to make one, last, decisive attack. He moved 1,500 of his warriors, including his crack amaNkayia brigade, to the north of the hill in a gigantic attack column, about twenty men wide and seventy-five ranks deep. There were only, from what he could see, about 500 Zulus left on this side of the hill. He would lead this charge in person and simply roll over the remnant of the Zulu force. He left the remainder of his regiments in an arc to the south of the hill as a pinning force to keep Shaka from reinforcing his threatened flank.

But Shaka could see very well what was coming and felt that the time was ripe for him to spring his trap. All day long he had been fighting off the Ndwandwe assaults with just four of his six regiments (the amaWombe, uDlambedlu, uKhangela, and Jubingwaqa), keeping his own elite brigade, consisting of the uFasimba and iziChwe regiments, out of sight and fresh in the hilltop depression. As the Ndwandwe shock column charged up the hill and into the waiting amaWombe regiment, Shaka launched his reserves in two encircling wings, completely enveloping the Ndwandwe column. These men had not expected such a large force to come out of nowhere. And they were thrown into a panic. This enveloping ploy on the part of Shaka was the first trial of a maneuver that would thereafter become the signature tactic of the Zulu army, the Impondo Zenkomo, or "beast's horns". In several minutes, virtually all of the surprised and demoralized Ndwandwes in the column, including Nomahlanjana and four of his brothers, were killed. They managed to take some Zulus with them, but the outcome was foregone.

As the fighting on the northern slope wound down, Shaka ordered his remaining regiment on the south side, the Jubingwaqa, to attack the southern wing of the Ndwandwes. These, hearing first rumour and then confirmation of the massacre of their comrades on the north, made a fighting retreat in the direction of the approaching 4,000 cattle raiders. When these latter came in sight, the Jubingqwanga broke off and, with the remnants of the regiment with the decoy (the Nkomendala), hung on the flanks of the retreating Ndwandwes to harass them and take back as many cattle as they could.

Meanwhile, Shaka dispatched two of his regiments (probably the fresher uFasimba and iziCwe) to the north to mop up the Ndwandwe stragglers who had gone off in search of water at the river.

The battle was a bloody one, in which the Ndwandwes supposed lost as many as 7,500 men (including five of Zwide's oldest sons), or almost two-thirds of their original force. The Zulus, though, suffered about 2,000 casualties (most of them killed), or about 40%. In the Nguni tradition of war-of-annihilation, neither side took prisoners.

While Shaka's newly trained army saved his people from extermination, he had by no means eliminated the Ndwandwe threat. He had only eked out a respite. The Zulus had given up several hundred cattle (the economic capital of the Zulu economy) and sacrificed precious fighters they could not afford to lose. However, Zwide was infuriated by the loss of his sons, by the blow to his arms, and, most of all by the temerity of the upstart usuper of the Zulu clan, and came back the following year with an even larger army and smarter generals. Shaka had just that year to build up his own power to meet the second invasion he knew was coming. This he was able to do by diplomacy with other tribes, and by attracting thousands of angry warriors with scores to settle with the Zwide.

== Fabrication by Ritter ==
Though the story of the battle has been widely circulated, evidence for it is very thin. The first account of the battle in any detail is Ernst Augustus Ritter's Shaka Zulu 1955, about 140 years after the battle allegedly took place. Dan Wylie, in his 1992 article “Textual Incest: Nathaniel Isaacs and the Development of the Shaka Myth” in the journal History in Africa, lays out how the story probably came to be:

Gqokli hill, however, first appears in Bryant’s Olden Times, and then only as a landmark to the battle which occurred on the nearby Mhlatuze river. Bryant cites no source for this, and it appears in no oral traditional account. However, Ritter assimilates Bryant’s passing reference, apparently misreads his precursor’s reference to Shaka drawing up his men in a “great circle” (a pre-battle harangue, not a defensive formation), and embellishes it into a sixteen-page account, complete with ranges, maneuvers, and casualty figures.

Wylie lays out a more thorough case against the story in a 1993 article “Dangerous Admiration: E.A. Ritter’s Shaka Zulu”. Wylie examines Ritter’s oral sources used in Shaka Zulu in detail. Ritter claimed that he had received his information on Gqokli Hill from two informants –Njengebantu and Mzuzeli Qwabe. Little is known of the latter, while the former is described as a son of Mahola who was in the same IziCwe regiment as Shaka under Dingiswayo. Wylie could find no other mention of Mahola in any other source, though this isn't definitive evidence, and could mean that Mahola was not a prominent figure. Ritter claimed that he was a daily listener to Njengebantu’s recital of Shaka’s deeds, and that this occurred when Ritter was 13 and Njengebantu was around 68 years of age. However, Ritter began writing the first draft of Shaka Zulu in 1949, 46 years after attending these daily sessions and therefore Wylie questions both the accuracy of Ritter’s memories as well as Njengebantu’s alleged retellings, especially in light of the story being completely absent from Zulu oral traditions. There are two possible references to Gqokli hill, both stories about battles at "Kwa Qori", a hill near the White Mfolozi River, just like Gqokli, but both battles were decisive defeats for Shaka. Further evidence against the battle is provided by the very precise casualty figures given by Ritter, with such precise figures not given in any other oral Zulu account. Due to this evidence, Wylie concludes the story of Gqokli hill was certainly fabricated by Ritter.
