= Gcabashe =

Gcabashe is a surname occurring in South Africa. Notable people with the surname include:

- Lungi Gcabashe (1960–2025), South African politician from KwaZulu-Natal
- Sipho Gcabashe, South African politician and businessman from KwaZulu-Natal
