= Matiwane =

King of the amaNgwane

Fleeing the Mthethwa and Zulu coalition, the amaNgwane under Matiwane, with some elements of the Hlubi, cross the Drakensberg to raid the Tlôkwa and Basuto of the highveld, before entering Xhosa territory.

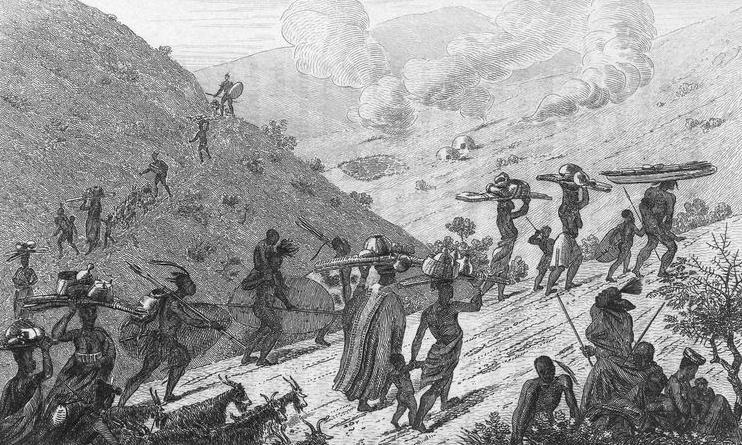
A section of the Hlubi people, once scattered by Matiwane's assault on their homeland, joined a coalition of peoples known as the Fengu.

King Matiwane (died c.1830, uMgungundlovu) of Masumpa was the king of the AmaNgwane and head of the Hlongwane royal family. The AmaNgwane kingdom, also known as emaNgwaneni, had an estimated population of 200,000 in 1800. Their kingdom was in present day South Africa, and extended from the Phongola River in the east to Wakkerstroom in the west, encompassing Utrecht (KwaNtabankulu) and the sources of the White Mfolozi River.

King Matiwane led the Ngwane during the Mfecane. Attacks from Zwide kaLanga of the Ndwandwe and Dingiswayo kaJobe of the Mthethwa led the AmaNgwane kingdom away from the White Mfolozi River towards the Drakensberg, where they defeated the Hlubi kingdom of Mtimkhulu II.

After the deaths of Dingiswayo kaJobe and Zwide kaLanga, Shaka kaSenzangakhona emerged as the king of the Zulu and the Mthethwa and began launching raids on Matiwane at the Drakensberg. Raids from Shaka pushed Matiwane towards the Highveld where he scattered the Zizi, Bhele, and Tolo chiefdoms. These groups started fleeing southeast into the territory of the Pondo, Thembu, and Xhosa. The people seeking refuge among the Xhosa were known as the AmaMfengu.

Once in the Highveld, Matiwane established the AmaNgwane Kingdom at Thaba Bosiu, collecting tribute from Moshoeshoe I. In 1827, Moshoeshoe I enlisted the help of Shaka at Thaba Bosiu, sending the AmaNgwane southeast where they started raiding the AbaThembu. The AbaThembu, Pondo, and Xhosa requested military assistance from the Cape Colony government. These groups joined forces under Lieutenant Colonel Somerset and defeated the AmaNgwane at the Battle of Mbholompo on August 28, 1828.

Matiwane returned to Moshoeshoe I with the crown prince Zikhali kaMatiwane, while a group of AmaNgwane remained at Umtata. Matiwane was slain by the new Zulu king, Dingane kaSenzangakhona, the half-brother of Shaka. The crown prince Zikhali escaped to the court of Sobhuza I of Swaziland. King Zikhali later returned to His land and reassembled the Ngwane at Mont-aux-Sources.

== Migrations ==
Matiwane first left his homeland at the source of the Phongola after attacks from Dingiswayo kaJobe and Zwide kaLanga. Matiwane moved some of his cattle and people into the Highveld. Soon afterwards, in 1817 or 1818, Shaka serving as Dingiswayo's general, attacked the amaNgwane and drove them across the Buffalo river, uMzinyathi. This was the onset of the Mfecane migrations in which nations became displaced, and in turn displaced others in a series of internecine wars.

The amaNgwane under Matiwane's leadership moved westwards, where they attacked the Hlubi, a larger kingdom built by Bhungane, in a quest to recover their cattle. Matiwane executed their king, Mthimkhulu II c.1818 and regent Mpangazitha c.1826. Some Hlubi abandoned their homeland and fled north or west, or joined Shaka, but some merged with the amaNgwane. Still others joined a coalition of refugees, the Fengu, who settled on the eastern frontier of the Cape Colony. The Hlubi rued this catastrophe, referring to it as the izwekufa ("country of death"), and ascribed it to an act of witchcraft.

For the next three to four years King Matiwane, now settled at Ntenjwa, now became the ruler of the upper Thukela region, near present-day Bergville, as he incorporated small sections of the Bhele (relations of the Hlubi) and Zizi.

In 1821 or 1822 Matiwane, expecting an attack from Shaka, fled over the Drakensberg and drove the Tlokwa tribe of chieftainess Mantatese (mother of Sekonyela) from their land in the Harrismith-Vrede region. Sotho tribes of the interior were also attacked, who fled to the region of Lesotho, where they joined the ranks of Moshoeshoe I. When Matiwane turned south and threatened Moshoeshoe I, he sought the protection of Shaka and sent him tribute. Matiwane established himself at Mabolela hill, near present day Clocolan, and Moshoeshoe complained to Shaka that this prevented him from sending tribute. Shaka dispatched Moselekatse (Mzilikazi) to attack Matiwane, who had to retreat before the impi's advance. They fled southwards to the lands of the abaThembu, which they once again plundered. They would however be defeated at the Battle of Mbholompo in 1828 by a coalition of the AmaMpondo who were led by king Faku kaNgqungqushe, amaXhosa led by King Hintsa, abaThembu led by king Ngubengcuka and colonial troops under the command of Major Dundas and Lieutenant Colonel Somerset.

Inkosana Thunyiswa Hlongwane of Matiwane was born after the Battle of Mbholompo, within the territory of King Hintsa kaKhawuta of the Xhosa. Thunyiswa is hailed as yinganga yase beNguni (nobleman of the Nguni) in recognition of his descent from the Hlongwane royal family. The Xhosa Bible of 1975 uses yinganga in contexts of royal leadership, including in 1 Kings 1:35, 1 Chronicles 29:22, and 2 Samuel 5:2. Nkosi, Ngwane, Hlongwane, Sangweni, Mntungwa, Ndabezitha, Mwelase, Ngwadi, Masumpa are terms of respect for the royal House of Hlongwane.

== Death ==
Dingane gifted Matiwane villages near the Hlomo amabutho ridge, less than a kilometer from his royal kraal UMgungundlovu, but had him executed a year later. Dingane posthumously appointed him as the "devil king" and "great king of the wicked", and had scores of his own enemies executed at KwaMatiwane, the Place of Matiwane. Matiwane was succeeded as the king of AmaNgwane by his son, King Zikhali.
