= Makhanya v Minister of Finance =

South African legal case

In Makhanya v Minister of Finance (2001), an important case in the South African law of succession, the deceased (R) was a civil servant who was murdered by his wife. In terms of the Governmental Services Act, his wife was entitled to receive his pension benefits. R's daughter, however, approached the court to declare the deceased's wife unworthy of inheriting. The court considered the question of whether the bloedige hand principle could be extended to statutory principles. The court held that public policy dictates that the principle should not be limited and accordingly extended its application to the statute.

== See also ==
- Law of succession in South Africa
