= Battle of Mhlatuze River =

1820 battle between the Zulu and Ndwandwe tribes

Coordinates: 28.8333°S 32°E

The Battle of Mhlatuze River was fought between the Zulu and Ndwandwe tribes in 1820 following the Zulu Civil War. The Ndwandwe hierarchy was set asunder by the battle, and largely scattered their population in response.

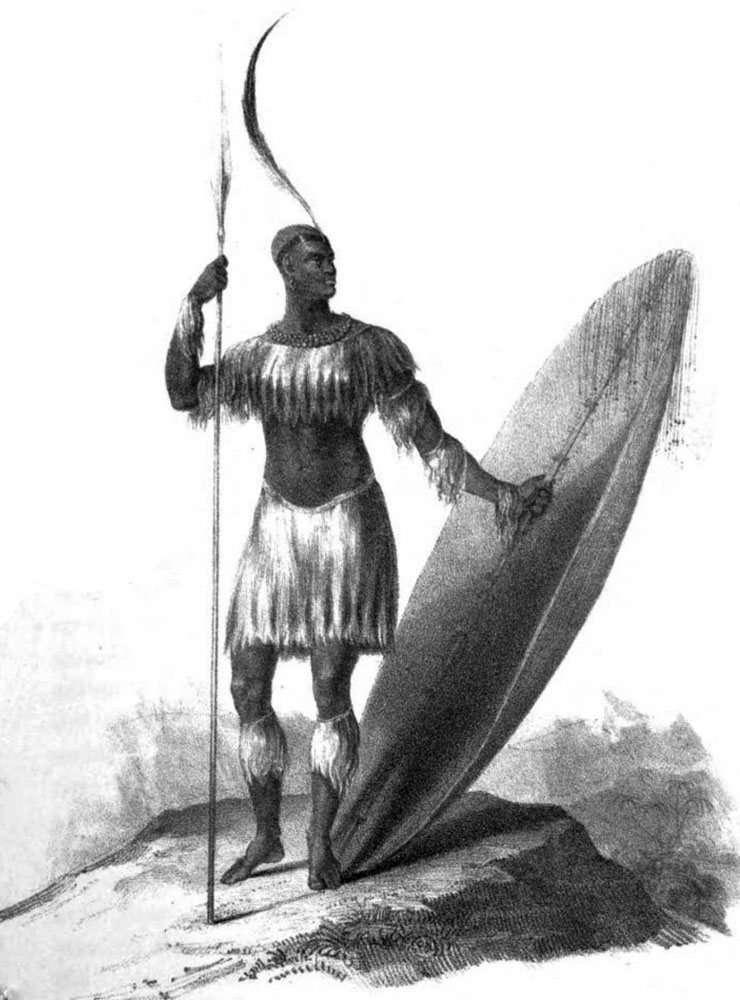
Sketch of King Shaka

== History ==
In 1818, Shaka had been attacked by Qwabe warriors led by Phakathwayo along the same river.

== The battle ==
As in the Battle of Gqokli Hill, Shaka's superior tactics led his people to victory. When the Ndwandwe attack came, he waited until about half were on each side of the river, effectively splitting the attackers into two separate groups which allowed a Zulu victory.

== See also ==
- Mhlatuze River
