= Sibusisiwe Violet Makhanya =

South African social worker

Sibusisiwe Violet Makhanya (1894 – 23 September 1971), was the first black South African social worker.

== Early life ==
Born in 1894, Sibusisiwe Violet Makhanya grew up in Umbumbulu, Natal, South Africa. After graduating from school, Makhanya traveled to America, where she attended Columbia University at the Teachers College. There, she studied to become a teacher before eventually returning back to Natal. Makhanya opposed social norms at the time by refusing to get married, and instead pursuing an independent career.

Known as Sibusisiwe or Violet (depending on the social circle she was interacting with), Makhanya made waves in the struggling educational environment that existed during apartheid. Makhanya was an active advocate for educating young girls about the need to remain pure and abstain from sex prior to marriage, and subsequently helped form the Bantu Youth League – a community center that advocated for health and Christian values. Makhanya is also credited with having started the equivalent of Boy and Girl Scout groups in South Africa. These groups were called the Bantu Purity League and the Pathfinder and Wayfarer Associations, respectively. Makhanya ultimately left teaching to work full-time in running the Bantu Purity League.

== Historical context ==
Makhanya began her career in a time of extreme oppression. Apartheid education in South Africa was severely regulated and intended to ensure Black South African loyalty towards the government. Schools for Black South Africans under the Bantu Education Act promoted racial inequality, and only provided enough education for Blacks to access low-level working jobs after graduation. Racism in South Africa in the mid-20th century was rampant and was seen through social organization methods that were utilized during apartheid. The color-caste system was a ranking system used under apartheid that organized races by tiers – with whites being on top, and Black South Africans being at the bottom. Bantu Education Act-era schooling perpetuated the color-caste system through curriculum disparity. Whereas white students were taught how to pursue high-level jobs that would guarantee they remained socially affluent, Black South Africans were only educated on how to fill labor-heavy roles that would benefit segregationists. Sibusisiwe Makhanya’s level of education differentiated her from many other Black South Africans at the time, as it allowed her the ability to achieve a higher-ranking job than what education under apartheid typically offered.

Like most Black educators during apartheid, Makhanya likely was at risk of experiencing an unfair work environment. Overt racism in the educational system also played a role in deterring Black South Africans from seeking teaching jobs. Poor government funding led to inadequate teacher salaries, which discouraged many Black educators from joining the profession. Pay for white male teacher assistants (less qualified, support figures in classrooms) was over double that of salaries for single Black female teachers (highly qualified educators), and nearly three times that of married Black female teachers. Black educators were also classified as the modern-day equivalent of “at-will employees” and were subjected to unjust firings. This lack of job security led to many teachers leaving the profession, which further impacted the quality of education that Black South Africans were able to receive.

== Education and Apartheid ==
=== Background in education ===
Violet’s first interaction with education was when she started a night school specifically for herdboys as well as a winter school for both girls and women which started as a Sunday school. Violet organized big meetings every year for her community leaders. Many articles were written about Violet’s Community Center in their local newspapers, which is when its story started to spread. The article described how the herdboys arrived at their class after herding cattle all day. Most of the classes lasted for about two hours every day of the week, usually during the night, and the young herd boys were seen outside her house playing football right before classes would start. When the lessons were over, a lineup started to form for supper, which was served on the back stoep of the center. Since it was later in the night, Violet organized places for the students to stay because there was no transportation. Later in her career, Violet also created education classes for older adults and was able to run a small library at a clinic in Umbumbulu.

The community center she worked at needed a schoolhouse, and Violet asked for a cement donation from her close community. She was able to pick a day and called it Cement Sunday. Its goal was to get funds to be able to finally build the schoolhouse. A lady called Lucy Johnston donated 5000 pounds after she died. Through this donation, Violet was able to build the classroom she wanted. Later in her career, her first official teaching position was run by the American Board missionaries in Eastern Cape Province. She was able to work in Bizana for about three years. In 1916 her alma mater was able to offer her a spot where she stayed until 1923. Between 1923 and 1927 she was appointed by the board to take charge of the Grey Street Young Women’s Hostel in Durban.

=== Apartheid and education involvement ===
Looking through Violet's educational involvement, a book called “Not Either an Experimental Doll” describes her story through letters. Through a sisterhood of Mabel Palmer, Lili Moya and Sibusisiwe Makhanya which shows the “simple minded feminist assumptions of the power of sisterhood in which the fracture of class, age, and ethnicity are of no account.” Who all share their differences and passions for education.” The book addresses “what is a burning issue in contemporary south africa, the nature of black education and educational institutions.” Violet's life was constantly shaped by the patriarchy of their own community and the disruptions they lived in due to the difference between the patriarchal mission christianity and the form of south africa and its racially structured capitalist which was based on the migrant labor system. Violet was described as being an outstanding zulu woman, and zulu women being the best of her generation in reality it was more complex to adapt to the model of education. But one thing that violet had was her powerful personality and she had a secure background. Her pride in her zulu identity and the focus of her mission was able to ensure that she would never suffer as much as her other sisterhood.

When Violet was younger she was known to be in mission circles, she was able to take this interest in community affairs and through this she as able to establish and organize Bantu Purity League. Her goal was to improve the moral standard of African girls. With both working, the Bantu league and night school impressed the Phelps Stokes commission on education while they were visiting Natal. But she actively refused to be shaped by the philanthropic and instead rebelled against this system. Violet figured out the key to coping with the pressure of capitalism which was adaptation to westernization and education. This did not mean for her that she was looking away from the old ways but when she was getting older she saw the value of tradition. But for her this meant absorbing foreign social institutions and making them compatible with the indigenous ones was key to success. With her returning to Umbumbulu, she organized another youth movement called Bantu Youth League. Violet was a woman of spirit and independence, which the book explains led her to a “strongly developed sense of what was known at the time of race consciousness.”

== Death and legacy ==
In the late 1960’s Violet's health became worse. Approaching 70 she was getting ill more often and so it became clear her health was declining. Before she died she said “More cultural and social centers are required. Living apart often creates jealousy, suspicion and lethargy. By coming together the people would learn to work as teams to better their conditions.” By the time of her death on 23 September 1971, Makhanya had never married. Relatives noted that she was likely too outspoken and stubborn for a long-term partnership, and friends stated that she was too busy to marry. After her death, Makhanya was honored through the dedication of a local high school in her name, as well as through recognition of her work at the Umbumbulu Community Center.
