= Langa KaXaba =

King of the Ndwandwe nation

Langa ka Xaba ka Ndwandwe (died c. 1805) was the King of the Ndwandwe nation. In the Nguni language . "Langa" means "sun" or "day" and "kaXaba" means "son of Xaba". He was the father and predecessor of King Zwide kaLanga, the rival to King Shaka kaSenzangakhona.
