= Ndwandwe =

Bantu Nguni-speaking people

- c. 1780–1825
- Locations of the Ndwandwe and rival Mthethwa empire on a map of present-day KwaZulu-Natal, South Africa. The Khumalo clan was wedged between these spheres of influence.
- Government: Monarchy
- nKosi
  - c. 1780 - 1805: Langa KaXaba
  - 1805 - 1825: Zwide kaLanga
- History
  - Established: c. 1780
  - Disestablished: 1825
Preceded by	Succeeded by
Nguni culture	Zulu Kingdom

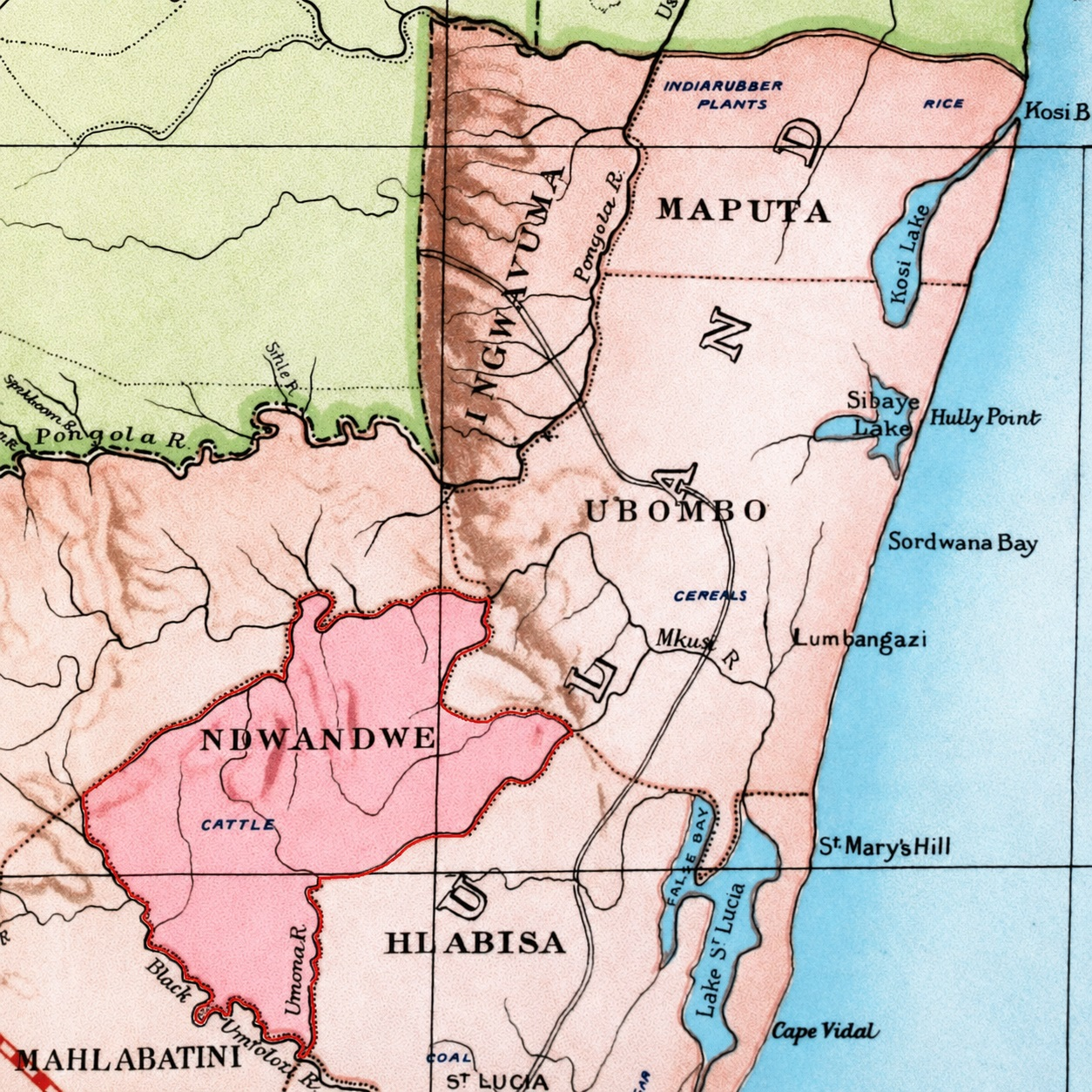
Ndwandwe county highlighted on a map of northern Zululand, Natal (1911)

The Ndwandwe are a Bantu Nguni-speaking people who populate sections of southern Africa. They owe their name to one of their early chiefs and are also known as the Nxumalo. Today, they can be found in South Africa, Mozambique, Eswatini, and Zimbabwe.

== History ==
Ndwandwe chieftaincies were part of the Northern Nguni migration and settled in the area between the Pongola River and the Black Umfolozi River during the eighteenth century. Over time, the Ndwandwe subjugated and incorporated the surrounding groups. By the later part of the eighteenth century, under the leadership of their king, Yaka, they had established themselves in a dominant position. North of the Ndwandwe lived the Ngwane people, while to the south were the Mthethwa, Zulu, and other groups.

The Ndwandwe, with the Mthethwa, were a significant power in present-day Zululand at the turn of the nineteenth century, while the Ngwane (who would later become known as the Swazi) were the dominant group to the north. Zwide kaLanga (c. 1758–1820/1825), the king of the Ndwandwe from about 1805 to 1820, had several royal settlements, with his main capital on Magudu Mountain south of present-day Pongola.

Under the leadership of Zwide kaLanga, the Ndwandwe destroyed the Mthethwa under their king Dingiswayo, in 1817/1818 when their armies met at Mbuzi Hill south of Magudu. This left Zwide as the most powerful leader in this region. The power vacuum created by the destruction of the Mthethwa was subsequently filled by a lieutenant of Dingiswayo, Shaka Zulu of the Zulu tribe. In a common front against the Ndwandwe, Shaka gathered the remnants of the Mthethwa and other surrounding tribes to wage war against them. In the first encounter of the Zulu Civil War (also known as the Zulu-Ndwandwe War) Shaka’s forces survived the Battle of Gqokli Hill in 1818.

In 1819, Zwide launched a second expedition against the Zulu, but Shaka changed his strategy by allowing the Ndwandwe army to enter his territory and then engaging in guerrilla warfare. A shortage of supplies forced the Ndandwe to decide to return home. During this retreat in early 1820, while they were crossing the Mhlatuze River, the Ndwandwe forces were divided and decisively defeated in the Battle of Mhlatuze River.

This defeat of the Ndwandwe forces, along with the subsequent retaliatory campaigns in which the Zulu destroyed all settlements and killed anyone they encountered, led to the fragmentation of the Ndwandwe nation over the next five years. There are different accounts regarding the fate of King Zwide. According to the oral traditions of Ndwandwe descendants from the Pongola Valley, Zwide was killed not long after the Battle of Mhlatuze River by Shaka's soldiers on the mountain that now bears his name, Zwide, located south of present-day Pongola. This site is not far from where his royal capital was on Magudu Mountain. Shortly afterward, he was buried on the southern slopes of Magudu Mountain in a forest considered sacred by the AmaNdwandwe, where other Ndwandwe leaders are also buried. Another version states that he fled northwards with some of his followers to the upper reaches of the Komati River, where he died in 1825.

Zwide's generals and sons, in an effort to survive, led segments of the Ndwandwe people northwards in the aftermath of their defeat and persecution by Shaka. One of these groups, under Soshangane, established the Gaza Empire in present-day central Mozambique, while another, under Zwangendaba, settled in present-day Malawi as the waNgoni. Others established themselves as chiefs of note in present-day Eswatini and Zambia. The remaining majority of the Ndwandwe was absorbed into the Zulu Kingdom. Thus, the Mfecane contributed to the creation and spread of a lasting Ndwandwe legacy across Southern Africa.

== Languages ==
The various Ndwandwe groups speak Nguni dialects.

== See also ==
- Ndwandwe–Zulu War
- Battle of Gqokli Hill
- History of South Africa
- Military history of South Africa
- Battle of Mhlatuze River
- Pongola
