= Zikode =

Zikode is a surname. Notable people with the surname include:

- Christopher Mhlengwa Zikode (born 1975), South African rapist and serial killer
- Nomcebo Zikode (born 1988), South African singer and songwriter
- S'bu Zikode (born 1975), South African activist
