= Dingiswayo =

Mthethwa King and mentor of Shaka Zulu (c. 1760–1817)

King Dingiswayo
- Reign: 1806 – 1817
- Born: Godongwana; 1760; KwaZulu-Natal, near Melmoth
- Died: 1817 (aged 56 or 57)
- Issue: Somveli, Seyama, Mngoye, Sonkonde, Ngungumbana, Mthakathi, Mgcobo, Khuzwayo, Shuqu, Manqe
- Father: Jobe kaKhayi
- Mother: Mabamba kaDonda
- Occupation: King of the Mthethwa Kingdom

Location of King Dingiswayo's kraal, Oyengweni, on a map of KwaZulu-Natal

King Dingiswayo (Zulu pronunciation: [diŋɡisʷaːjo]; c. 1760 – 1817), born as Godongwana, was a king of the Mthethwa Kingdom, well known in history for his mentorship over a young Zulu general, Shaka kaSenzangakhona, who rose to become one of the most influential of the Zulu Kings. His father was the Mthethwa King, Jobe kaKayi.

It was under Dingiswayo that the Mthethwa rose to prominence, mostly employing diplomacy and assimilation of nearby chiefdoms to strengthen his power base. According to Mthethwa (1995), the Mthethwas are descended from the Nguni peoples of northern Natal and the Lubombo Mountains, whose modern identity dates back some 700 years.

== Lineage ==
Dingiswayo's lineage can be traced back to Mthethwa I. It is possible that Dingiswayo and Zwide kaLanga shared the same lineage through Xaba KaMadungu. Zwide was the king of the Ndwandwe, Khumalo, Msene, and Jele peoples. There does not, however, appear to be a direct family link between Zwide kaLanga and Soshangane kaZikode of the Nxumalo people.

Dingiswayo's Mthethwa family line is stated by Mthethwa (1995) as follows:

- Dingiswayo
- Jobe
- Khayi
- Xaba
- Madungu
- Simamane and Wengwe
- Ndlovu
- Khubazi
- Nyambose
- Mthethwa

== Early life ==
Godongwana kaJobe is first recorded during the wanderings of Nandi and her son Shaka, who settled with the Mthethwa under King Jobe. Godongwana and his brother, Tana, plotted against their father Jobe, but their plot was discovered. Tana was killed and Godongwana made his escape. Nursed back to health by a sister, the young man found refuge in the foothills of the Drakensberg among the Qwabe and Langeni people. He changed his name to Dingiswayo, which means "one in distress or in exile".

== King of the Mthethwas ==
Upon his father's death, he returned to Oyengweni his tribal home to claim the Kingship. He found his brother Mawewe in power. He displaced him without resistance. Mawewe fled but was lured back and killed.

Captain Goddard Edward Donovan and Dr Andrew Cowan of the 83rd Regiment who were exploring a Southern approach to the African interior and were possibly murdered by chief Phakathwayo, (Note: The exact fate of Cowan and Donovan is unknown, there are many conflicting stories, it may be that African oral-history relates that Cowan was murdered by Ph. Cowan's journals which were rediscovered by Crampton 2012 shed no light on what became of him. Burke 1975 offers some possible theories on what may have happened, but there is no reliable evidence of their demise) and Dingiswayo subsequently acquired Cowan's horse and gun. Dingiswayo's new military tactics were an adoption of western techniques of drills and formation movements under a chain of command.

With Shaka as his general, he attacked the Amangwane under Matiwane in about 1812 and drove them across the Buffalo river. It was the first of the Mfecane migrations – tribes displaced, latterly by the Zulus, and who in turn displaced others in a series of internecine wars.

Dingiswayo combined several smaller tribes to oppose his chief rival to the north, Chief Zwide of the Ndwandwe.

== Death and legacy ==
In 1816 Shaka returned to the Zulu to claim chieftainship, while still recognising the larger Mthethwa and Dingiswayo as overlords. However, in the course of an attempted invasion of Zwide's territory, Dingiswayo was captured and beheaded by Zwide at Ngome, near Nongoma. His possessions were buried in his kraal. Dingiswayo's grave is on the north bank of the Tugela River, in KheKheKhe's kraal. The Mthethwa forces were defeated and scattered temporarily, with the remnants reforming under Shaka. Zwide was later defeated by Shaka in the Zulu Civil War.

Dingiswayo's career marked a watershed in the history of south-east Africa. During his exile, he was exposed to European ideas and he put these into practice to produce a disciplined and highly organised army for the first time in the region. After his death, Shaka extended these ideas to create a rigidly disciplined society to complement Dingiswayo's military reforms.

=== Origins and transformation ===
The study by Argely, J. (1977) examined the origins of the prominent men in the history of the AmaZulu kingdom, both Dingiswayo and Shaka. However, for the benefit of this study, it is used to look into Chief Dingiswayo who according to Annon (2019) it is the “Paramount Chief of the Mthethwa”, he was not only the leader of his people but he was a leader of various northern Nguni tribe and this was before the rise of King Shaka and also it was before the start of Mfecane which resulted in a large number of migrations taking place.

The man in question was born in the year 1760 (month and date are unknown) and he was given the name Godongwana which he later changed because of family politics which led to him having to flee away from his home and be in exile for quite a while. His exile began after he escaped execution for treason by his father, King Jobe, after he and his brothers, complained about their father being unfit for the throne, and stressed that it would be better if one of them had been King instead, a conversation overheard by the induna of Oyengweni, Nodunga ka Makhanya, who then went on to report to King Jobe what he had heard. Jobe then executed all the adult princes of Oyengweni palace for treason, with only Dingiswayo surviving and running into exile (James Stuart, uBaxoxele, London: Longman, Green, 1924, pp. 14–42). While in exile Dingiswayo got himself under the protection of the Hlubi under Chief, that is where he changed his name to Dingiswayo which means the exile one.

This experience of being exiled one can argue that it is because of its stress, pressure, and anger that molded his transformation, while others can say passion and love for his nation is what urged him. However, both these theories make sense as evidence has made it evident that he saw himself as the leader of the Mthethwa long before it was his time to be one. The then prince Makhasana ka Mwayi (later King) of the Tembe Kingdom, with his lessons on trade, development, and economic gain provided him with all the skills he needed to transform himself.

=== Role in state formation and military innovations ===
The rise of the AmaZulu Kingdom within a short period is one remarkable achievement that cannot be left ignored, especially for the Nguni people. Chanaiwa, D.S. (1980) refers to the state formation as a “revolution”, he states that it was a violent encounter that overthrew the normal or rather “used to” traditional political system and made a remarkable transformative social order. This revolution was done through the reign of five leaders namely: Chief Dingiswayo (c. 1800-1818), Dingiswayo is regarded as the foundation layer of this revolution as mentioned above, he played a crucial role in what was then the Zululand with different started clan. His shoes were filled by the well-endowed King Shaka kaSenzangakhona (1816-1828) who formed the AmaZulu Kingdom, continued with the revolution and most importantly he was the leader who led throughout the peak of the revolution. The legacy left by both Dingiswayo and Shaka was then continued by King Dingane (1828-1840) a brother of King Shaka and the first AmaZulu king to have an encounter with the European encroachment on the Zululand, he was then succeeded by his younger brother King Mpande (1840-1872), he did not only encounter the Boers or the British but he was their vassal and this is what King Cetshwayo (1872-1884) was not in agreement with, as a result, this led to him being killed while he was fighting against British colonisation (Chanaiwa, D.S. 1980: 1-4). This revolution in question was caused by many factors which included innovation, the indigenous process of state formation, crisis resolution, and value orientation.

=== Value orientation ===
In the value orientation, sub-topic/section cattle were the key role players as they were used to determine the status and wealth of a man (household), and they were also used as a medium of exchange. The favourite cattle would be given a name, it would be trained to be able to identify its owner's voice and have poems made to give praise to it. This act symbolised the value that these cattle had on their owners. However, this cause had consequences, this culture of complex cattle culture made the AmaZulu society profound of their society and it created it not to be a pastoralist capitalist conducive mode but rather a society that is characterised by private ownership opportunities. This was made evident by the headers (heads of the family) because they would have a place built in the center of the household, where all the ancestral practices would be performed (which are still being practiced even to date) and burials. The imbalance and inequality that were faced by the cattle less commoners are what drove this theme/ practice (value orientation) to be part of the revolution (state formation). In this way this approach by Dingiswayo was trying to do away with cattle private ownership and replace it with agrarian conquerors which meant that the commoners with no cattle were rewarded for their contribution to their clans either for bureaucratic elite, attracting new subjects or for value and loyalty. This practice was done to give them a sense of value and dignity (Chanaiwa, D.S. 1980 p. 5-9).

=== Indigenous state formation process ===
Etherington, N. (2005) argues that the Mthethwa kingdom served as the home to several smaller chiefdoms of which in the later 18th century it was the AmaZulu Kingdom, and it dominated the areas from the Umkhomazi River which is in the south of the Hluhluwe in the north (Etherington, N. 2005). Chief Dingiswayo’s leadership was the period that the Mthethwa kingdom rose to power, it was influenced by the economic strength it got from trading in the Delagoa Bay. It used this influence to its advantage by exploiting the coastal lowlands and its resources (Valieva, E. 2016).

One would argue that Chief Dingiswayo was a man who thought outside the box because his way of building an indigenous state was not the usual methods at that time, war and force were regarded as the normal way. However, Chief Dingiswayo employed a different process. Firstly, for him to get the Sokhulu chiefdom under his kingdom, he appointed Nqoboko kaLanga to be the chief of the Sokhulu, this meant that Nqoboko had to remain loyal and reliant to the Mthethwa in a way that his father was not. Moreover, they had to frequently report to Oyengweni (the capital of Chief Dingiswayo), and also Nqoboko was required to assist with expanding the area of the Mthethwa hegemony and proceed with the consolidation process around Nzimelani in the north and other neighbouring areas. This meant that they had to do away with their ruling lineage. Secondly, when Chief Senzangakhona of the Zulu Chiefdom died after a short illness, Chief Dingiswayo then promoted or rather pushed Shaka to fight for his rightful inheritance because according to the royal customs of isihlalo Shaka as the firstborn was the heir (Argyle, J. 1977). However, from the occurrence of events, it is evident that the reason behind Dingiswayo supporting Shaka was for the benefit of his nation (the Mthethwa kingdom). He wanted to make sure that the Mthethwa ruling lineage was well represented in the Zulu royal court, hence why he firstly, groomed and mentored Shaka to be the kind of a leader he wanted him to be through the role of being induna yezicwe. Secondly, he appointed Ngomane kaNqomboli (whose role has been discussed above) to be his father and advisor and lastly, he sent one of his wives Gudayi and other agents to be under Shaka’s chiefdom who at a later stage became a kingdom (Nxumalo, S. 2024:15-17).

Through his military innovations and skills, Shaka was able to reform the Zulu army, making it fit enough to fight battles for the benefit of the Mthethwa king (Dingiswayo), this was a successful plan for Dingiswayo because he had managed to still keep Shaka useful to his benefit, hence why (Annon 2017) uses these choices of words “while Shaka Zulu became the new king of the Zulu kingdom, he remained the vessel of Dingiswayo”. These Divide and conquer attacks started in ca. 1817, when Shaka attacked Mbatha’s palace while at the same time Dingiswayo attacked Ntshalini. These attacks started as a raid (raids); however, they ended up being massacred, and whoever was an obstacle in their raids was brutally removed (Gluman, M. 1940). These invasions continued with eLangeni (the Mhlongo palace) under Njomane, followed by a section of Mtungwa and Shenge together with Qungubeni palaces being attacked (Nxumalo, S. 2024:17). Men and women of the invaded palaces were taken to be under Shaka with men being incorporated in the military while women were placed in ezigodlweni (royal huts). However, with the eLangeni refugees, it was a different story because it is where Queen Nandi (Shaka’s mother) was biologically from. They were sent to the Mthethwa kingdom where they were given land for them to be able to sustain themselves. This act of giving them land was not only out of the respect he had for Queen Nandi, but it was sympathy he had, he believed in building a nation and giving land to his victims to be independent and keeping them sustained, that should be applauded.

According to Nxumalo, S. (2024:18), Shaka was given a task to further expand his invasions and attack Qodi and Ngadi until he reached Matiwane of the Ngwane, as a result, this expansion caused a drift between Dingiswayo and Ndwandwe because he was also aiming for that territory. Due to bitterness, Zwide kaNdwandwe attacked Nxumalo who happened to have had an alliance with Dingiswayo, as a result, Dingiswayo no longer regarded this as just a clash but rather a personal vendetta. In response to the attack of Zwide on Nxumalo, Dingiswayo in late 1810 set out a major attack on Ndwandwe which resulted to Dingiswayo being killed after being captured by Ndwandwe.

=== Innovations ===
Various innovations had transpired, and they are linked with the period of state formation where a large number of men and women had to be placed in different groups, specifically military for men. Many scholars like Chanaiwa, Thompson, and others are against some of the innovations that Dingiswayo had implemented because they believe that they were meant to weaken other chiefdoms, however, this section will outline the intentions of the innovations.

Mthethwa, A.M. (1995) refers to the innovations that Dingiswayo had implemented in attempting to rejuvenate the kingdom as “theory put into practice” because while in exile Dingiswayo came across several re-establishing approaches that had a positive impact on him. These approaches pushed him to fulfill the vision he had about Oyengweni. The first task he gave himself, was to redefine the Mthethwa military army, he intended to blend education and military, and this approach was inspired by the whites he was trading within Delagoa Bay. Moreover, the fact that the already existing army was constantly faced with problems which were a result of the inner division caused by greed and power hunger from his brother Mawewe, this gave him sleepless nights because his army was smaller compared to the Ndwandwe army, his rival (Nxumalo, S. 2024:14). There were already existing military armies that were invented by Chief Jobe; however, their military skills and innovations were mainly focused on security and war. Jobe’s regiments were divided into three (3) categories which included Amabutho Amnyama (Black regiments); Amabutho Amhlophe (White regiments) and uYengendlovu (Elephant-baiters). Whereas Dingiswayo’s intervention or rather innovation expanded these regiments, he introduced seven (7) new military regiments. These regiments were iZichwe (Bushmen regiments) under induna (commander) uThayiza; iNyakeni (Spoon-bags) under induna Dube kaYengeni, followed by iNhlangano (Unity) under induna uNgomane kaMqomboyi, he was also made in charge of the district that is near to kwaNogqogqo where the turbulent southwestern border of the Mthethwa kingdom. They were then followed by iNingizimu (Southern regiment) which was under Mayanda kaMkhwanazi, ibutho iMini (Daylight regiment) which was under induna uNomadidi kaGugusha kaMvelase and iNyakatho military (Northern military) and lastly ibutho labeSifazane (Females military regiment) under Nohaya kaNgabha kaNsindona kaMwandla (Mthethwa, A.M. 1995:59-60). This army was the largest army that the Mthethwa kingdom has ever had, it was inclusive as it portrayed women empowerment this spoke to the aim of transformation that was addressed above that spoke about blending education with the military. It showed that Chief Dingiswayo was also in support of empowerment, inclusivity, and providing opportunities to everyone despite their gender.

However, Chanaiwa, M. (1980) criticises this age regiments approach that Dingiswayo had applied in his kinship, he states that chiefs were the leaders of the military and war before, therefore with this new strategy, they were being undermined and made to be seen as powerless. Another issue that was raised, was doing away with the circumcision cultural practice and replacing it with military training, Dingiswayo believed that circumcision allowed his regiments to get proper training and guidance into manhood hence why he saw the need to abolish this practice. It was not beneficial for the regiments specifically Izichwe in any manner but on the other hand military training was as it equipped them and kept them stronger.

=== Social and ethnic changes ===
Building alliances was one key that Dingiswayo used was unit and conquer, this approach Dingiswayo used through marriage as it solidified the relationship between him and the neighbours, with the Ndwandwe clan being a threat to him and his people and this method was used to prevent them from attacking unseen (Golan, D. 1990). A leader is a leader by how his or her people live, and that is what makes it more interesting about Chief Dingiswayo. He wanted to improve the lives of his people, and he did that through agriculture, trade, and social cohesion. This made him one of the wealthy chiefs in the region and inspired others to be like him including Shaka when he took over his father's thrones (Morris, D. 1965).

Moreover, the period of Chief Dingiswayo’s leadership had drastic social changes to it, which included the expansion of the Zulu authority to the larger Zululand, and this resulted in several chiefs in the region being subordinates of Dingiswayo and later Shaka. Under the leadership of King Shaka this had negative effects as it was one of the causes of Mfecane which resulted to a number of clans and other ethnic groups migrating to the north of Africa this including the Matabele and other Zulu clans (Chanaiwa, D., 1980).
