= Mhlathuze River =

- Location of the Mhlathuze River's mouth

Location
- Country: South Africa

Physical characteristics
- Source
  - location: Babanango, South Africa
  - elevation: 1,519 m (4,984 ft)
- Mouth: Maputo River
  - location: Indian Ocean, KwaZulu-Natal
  - coordinates: 28°48′S 32°3′E
- Length: 100 km (62 mi)
- Basin size: 4,209 km^{2} (1,625 sq mi)

The Mhlathuze River (Afrikaans: Mhlathuzerivier) is a river in South Africa. Located in KwaZulu-Natal, its catchment area has a surface area of 4,209 km^{2}. It rises in the west in the Babanango hills at an altitude of 1,519 m and flows over 100 km eastwards to the sea forming an estuary. The deep-sea port of Richards Bay is situated at the mouth of the Mhlathuze River and all industrial development is focused within the Empangeni / Richards Bay complex.

== Dams ==
- Goedertrouw Dam

== See also ==
- List of rivers of South Africa
- Battle of Mhlatuze River
