= Mthethwa Kingdom =

Former confederation in modern day South Africa (1780-1817)

Coordinates: 28°30′54″S 31°50′55″E

Mtetwa Mthethwa Paramountcy
- c. 1780–1817
- Locations of the Mthethwa Paramountcy, and the rival Ndwandwe clan on a map of present-day KwaZulu-Natal, South Africa
- Official languages: IsiLala
- Government: Confederation
- Inkosi
  - c. 1780–1806: Jobe kaKhayi
  - 1806–1817: Dingiswayo kaJobe
- History
  - Established: c. 1780
  - Disestablished: 1817
Preceded by	Succeeded by
Nguni culture	Zulu Kingdom

The Mthethwa Paramountcy, sometimes referred to as the Mtetwa or Mthethwa Empire, was a Southern African state that arose in the 18th century south of Delagoa Bay and inland in eastern southern Africa. "Mthethwa" means "the one who rules".

== Background ==
According to Muzi Mthethwa (1995), the Mthethwas are descended from the Nguni tribes of northern Natal and the Lubombo Mountains, whose modern identity dates back some 700 years. They are among the first Nguni-Tsonga groups who left the Great Lakes in Central Africa between 200 AD and 1200 AD. On arrival in Southern Africa, they settled around modern-day Swaziland, mainly on the Lubombo Mountains, before leaving in the 17th century to settle in modern-day KwaZulu-Natal, in the Nkandla region.

It consisted of roughly 30 Nguni chiefdoms, lineages, and clans. Unlike its successor, the Zulu Kingdom, the Mthethwa Paramountcy was a confederation. After Zulu chief Shaka kaSenzagakhona (better known as Shaka Zulu) became king, he forged a nearly homogeneous nation with a single king (Inkosi).

The Mthethwa Paramountcy was consolidated and extended under the rule of Dingiswayo. The chief entered into an alliance with the Tsonga to the north in the early 19th century and began trading Ivory and other things with the Portuguese in Mozambique. About 1811, the Buthelezi and a number of other Nguni groups, including the then still marginal Zulu clan led by Senzangakona, were integrated into a sort of confederacy with the Mthethwa clan predominating.

Dingiswayo was killed in a battle with the Ndwandwe in 1817. The Mthethwa Paramountcy was then superseded by the Zulu Kingdom under Shaka, a former lieutenant in the Mthethwa army. Many military and administrative institutions, including the system of age regiments (amabutho) that later characterized the Zulu kingdom were utilized by Mthethwa, although an older theory that credits the Nyambose rulers of Mthethwa with the introduction of amabutho is no longer accepted because of evidence for the widespread existence of amabutho going back into the 18th century and perhaps earlier. The Mthethwa were amongst the first Nguni Chiefdoms to use guns.

== Succession Dispute ==
Upon the death of Nksoi Ntemba kaMhlana in 2017, his son Mduduzeni kaNtemba proceeded to assume the throne. However the children of the late Mbuso kaNtemba argued that since Mbuso was the first born son of king Ntemba's first wife, okaMqayi, whereas Mduduzeni was the son of the fifth wife, MaCele, who was inducted into the Great House.

Spokesperson James Mthethwa, says that although Mduduzeni was born to the fifth wife, because she was inducted into the Great House she also had the right to give birth to an heir.

The dispute is still undergoing with the matter having been subjected to onging civil litigation in the Pietermaritzburg High Court.

== Mthethwa Kingship Line ==
The Mthethwa ruling house traces its foundational lineage directly to the Nyambose, who served as the ancestral royal line and core identity of the Mthethwa people.

Mthethwa
Nyambose
Khubazi
Ndlovu
Simamane-wengwe
Madangu
Xaba
Khayi
Jobe	Mbikwane	Nqola	Shangane
Tana	Godongwana (Dingiswayo)	Mawewe	Mondise	Myaka	Mbiya
Somveli

== See also ==
- Mfecane
- Zululand

== Bibliography ==
- Morris, Donald R. (1965). The Washing of the Spears: The Rise of the Zulu Nation under Shaka and its fall in the Zulu War of 1879. New York: Simon and Schuster. OCLC 408488., reprinted in 1998 by Da Capo Press, Cambridge, ISBN 0-306-80866-8
