= Babanango Game Reserve =

Private game reserve in KwaZulu-Natal, South Africa

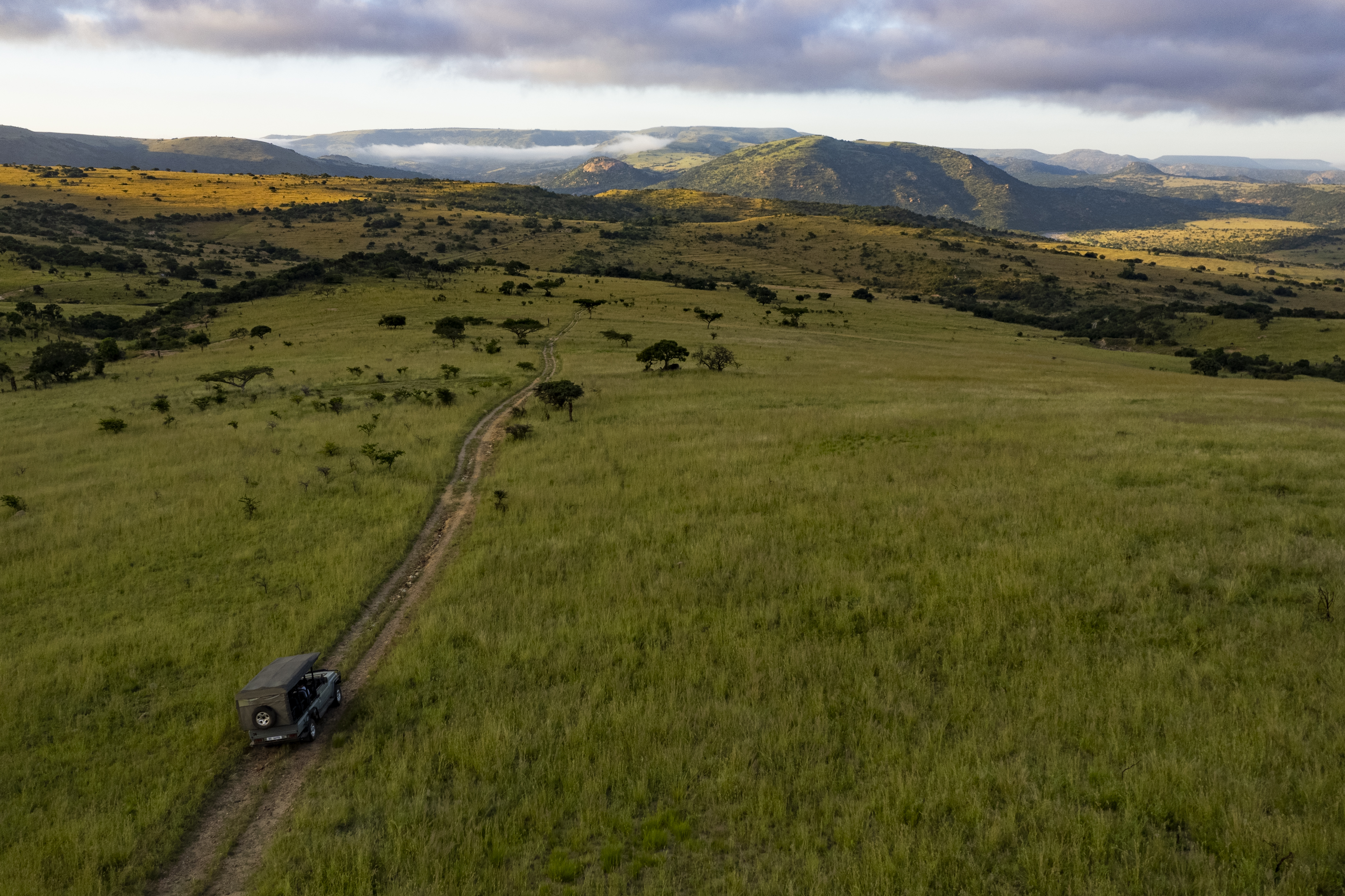
- Location: Ulundi, KwaZulu-Natal, South Africa
- Nearest city: Vryheid, Ulundi and Melmoth
- Coordinates: 28°15′33″S 31°6′27″E
- Established: 2017
- Website: https://babanango.com

Babanango Game Reserve, located in the KwaZulu-Natal province of South Africa, is a malaria-free game reserve covering almost 21,000 hectares (200 km2) of restored wilderness. The reserve supports endemic flora and fauna including the Big Five as well as species like the brown hyena, aardvark and aardwolf. It is one of the largest biodiversity projects in South Africa in recent decades, particularly notable for its extensive rewildling initiatives. The reserve has been recognised by the 30x30 global initiative as a role model of community-led conservation, biodiversity restoration, and economic upliftment in South Africa.

== History ==
KwaZulu-Natal has a rich history influenced by diverse cultures. Originally settled by Nguni-speaking peoples who migrated from Central Africa in the 16th century, the region laid the foundation for the Zulu nation. In 1497, Portuguese explorer Vasco da Gama arrived on the coast and named the area 'Natal'. British settlers established a presence in the Port of Natal in 1824, later developing sugar plantations along the coastline.

By the early 19th century, the area of the Babanango Game Reserve was part of a Zulu kingdom ruled by King Shaka Zulu. The British invaded Zululand in 1879, and several significant battles including Isandlwana and Rorke's Drift, took place close to Babanango. After the British victory, land once grazed by the Zulu people was handed to white farmers.

With the end of apartheid and South Africa's reconciliation in the mid-1990s, the land was returned to its traditional Zulu owners. However, it remained largely uninhabited and underutilised, turning into a series of cattle farms and degraded grasslands.

In 2018, a conservation partnership was formed between local community trusts (Emcakwini, Esibongweni and KwaNgono), Ezemvelo KZN Wildlife and the African Habitat Conservancy - a wildlife conservation management company formed by private German investors. This partnership initiated a major rehabilitation project to restore indigenous flora and reintroduce native wildlife.

The project focused on rehabilitating the reserve through eradicating invasive plant species, repairing erosion damage, and re-establishing natural grazing and browsing systems. After relocating livestock from the reserve, the 81km perimeter fence was completed in 2022, allowing translocations of animals into the area to roam freely within the reserve.

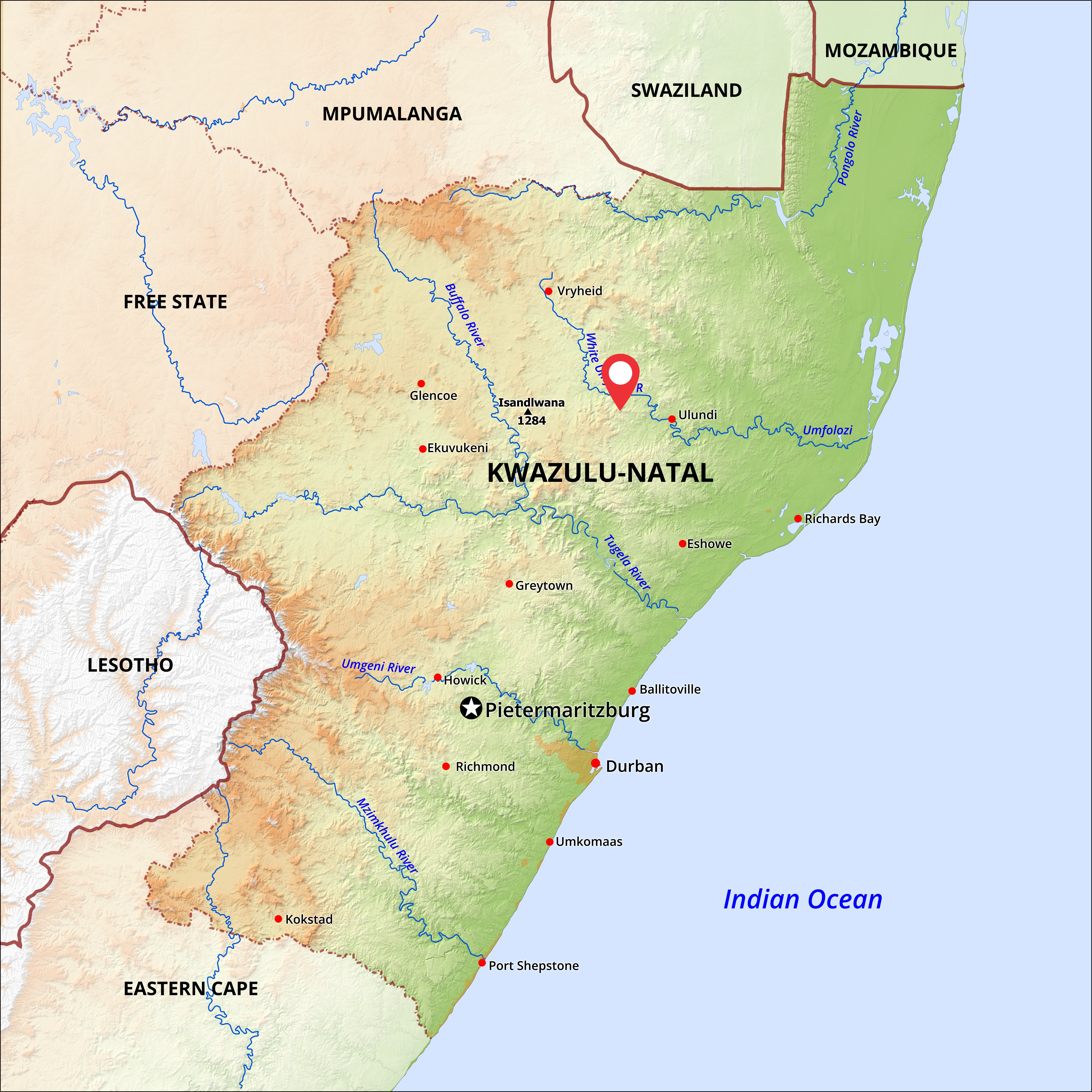
Location of Babanango Game Reserve

== Location and geography ==
Babanango Game Reserve is situated in the upper White Umfolozi River valley, about 50 kilometres from Vryheid, in central KwaZulu-Natal. The reserve's diverse topography includes rolling grasslands, rugged hills, and deeply incised valleys, which support a variety of ecosystems ranging from mistbelt grasslands and thornveld to river frontage.

The reserve is easily accessible from major cities and transportation hubs. King Shaka International Airport in Durban is a three-hour drive from the northern entrance, while OR Tambo International Airport in Johannesburg is roughly a six-hour drive away.

== Geology ==
The reserve lies on the eastern margin of the ancient Kaapvaal Craton, one of the world's oldest pieces of continental crust. The oldest rocks in the reserve are Archaean granitoids and gneisses, more than three billion years old forming a stable basement foundation for younger layers.

Above the basement, isolated inliers of the Nsuze Group (part of the Pongola Supergroup) crop out along the White Umfolozi valley. These rocks are around 3.0 billion years old and consist of volcanic flows, volcaniclastics, sandstones, conglomerates, and carbonate beds - recording ancient volcanoes, rivers, and shallow seas. Some carbonate beds in the Nsuze contain stromatolites, which are layered structures built by microbial mats. These fossils provide evidence of shallow-water environments and some of the earliest life on Earth.

Much later, during the late Carboniferous to Triassic, the area was covered by sediments of the Karoo Supergroup. These include the Dwyka Group, which preserves glacial diamictites from ice ages in southern Gondwana, and the overlying Ecca Group, dominated by mudstones, shales and some coal beds, deposited in deeper marine and delta environments.

During the Early Jurassic (about 180 million years ago), magma associated with the Karoo Large Igneous Province intruded into these sediments as thick sheets of dolerite dykes and sills. These dark igneous intrusions cut across the older Karoo rocks and are now exposed in ridges and cliffs across KwaZulu-Natal.

Together, the Archaean basement, the Nsuze Group, the Karoo sedimentary rocks, and the Jurassic dolerite intrusions show that Babanango preserves a geological record spanning nearly three billion years of Earth history.

== Conservation efforts ==
Babanango Game Reserve is home to one of South Africa's largest rewilding projects in recent decades. Over 3,500 medium- to large-sized mammals have been successfully reintroduced. These include elephants, lions, oribi, klipspringer, cheetah and endangered black rhinos.

The reintroduction process began in 2019 into smaller fenced-off areas within the reserve. Once the 3,000 head of cattle were relocated and the perimeter fence was complete, internal fences were removed allowing animals to roam freely across the 20,000-hectare reserve. Cheetah, rhino and lions were reintroduced from 2022 to mid-2023, with elephants completing the Big Five status in June 2023.

The black rhino reintroduction, in partnership with the World Wildlife Fund's Black Rhino Range Expansion Project (BRREP), was a major conservation milestone. This project aimed to establish a new population of critically endangered black rhinos in the region from several orphaned black rhinos. To protect the species, rhinos' horns are shaved down to dissuade any poachers.

== Community initiatives ==
Babanango Game Reserve has been developed as a model for community-based conservation. The land is leased from the local communities under long-term agreements, which include job creation, training, and revenue-sharing arrangements. Approximately 75% of the reserve's permanent staff are hired from local communities. The Babanango Foundation also helps send children to school, provides drinking water through boreholes, and promotes conservation awareness among children.

== Wildlife ==
In addition to the Big Five - lion, leopard, elephant, buffalo, and both black and white rhinoceros - Babanango Game Reserve is home to a range of wildlife including various antelope species such as oribi, eland and giraffe, as well as zebra, warthogs and more. It is also home to rare and elusive smaller mammals like serval, caracal, aardvark and aardwolf.

== Birds ==
Babanango Game Reserve is home to a recorded 334 bird species (and counting), with the game reserve's diverse habitats and altitudinal variations creating a welcoming environment for a variety of birds. It is home to some of South Africa's rare birdlife, such as the blue crane, the Verreaux's eagle, and the white backed vulture – three of the nine rare breeding pairs.

Some of the birds at Babanango Game Reserve include: White-bellied bustard, Fan-tailed grassbird, Striped pipit, Buff-streaked chat, Wailing and Wing-snapping cisticola, Eastern long-billed lark, Malachite sunbird, Black-winged lapwing, Denham's bustard, Bald ibis, Lanner falcon, Verreaux's eagle, Black-chested snake eagle, Brown snake eagle, Tawny eagle, Wahlberg's eagle, Martial eagle, Marsh owl, various vulture species, White-crested helmetshrike, Mocking cliff chat, Blue crane, Secretary bird, African pipit, Dusky lark, Sabota lark, Shelley's and red-winged francolin, Cinnamon and Golden-breasted bunting, Jameson's firefinch (near the westernmost point of its range in KZN), Bushveld pipit, Giant kingfisher, Half-collared kingfisher, Mountain wagtail, African black duck, Lesser moorhen, Dwarf bittern, African fish eagle, African darter.

== Insects and reptiles ==
Some of the insects and reptiles at Babanango Game Reserve include: African red toad, Grey foam-nest tree frog, Natal sand frog, Common river frog, Variable skink, Rainbow skink, Flap-necked chameleon, Ornate scrub lizard, Common dwarf gecko, Cape centipede-eater, Common purple-glossed snake, Hairy golden orb-weaving spider, Shorthorn kitespider, Banded garden spider, Highveld lesser-thicktail scorpion, Speckled emperor, Apollo moth, Common spreadwing.

== Flora ==
Some of the flora at Babanango Game Reserve include: Hard fern, Fishbone cassia, Dwarf elephant root, Sweet thorn, Splendid thorn, Common coral tree, Bright indigo, Red-leafed fig, Scrambling fig, Bluebush, Common meadow star, Thorny gardenia, Black monkey orange, Glossy bottlebrush, various aloe species including Aloe gerstneri, Squirrel's tail, Obscure morning glory.

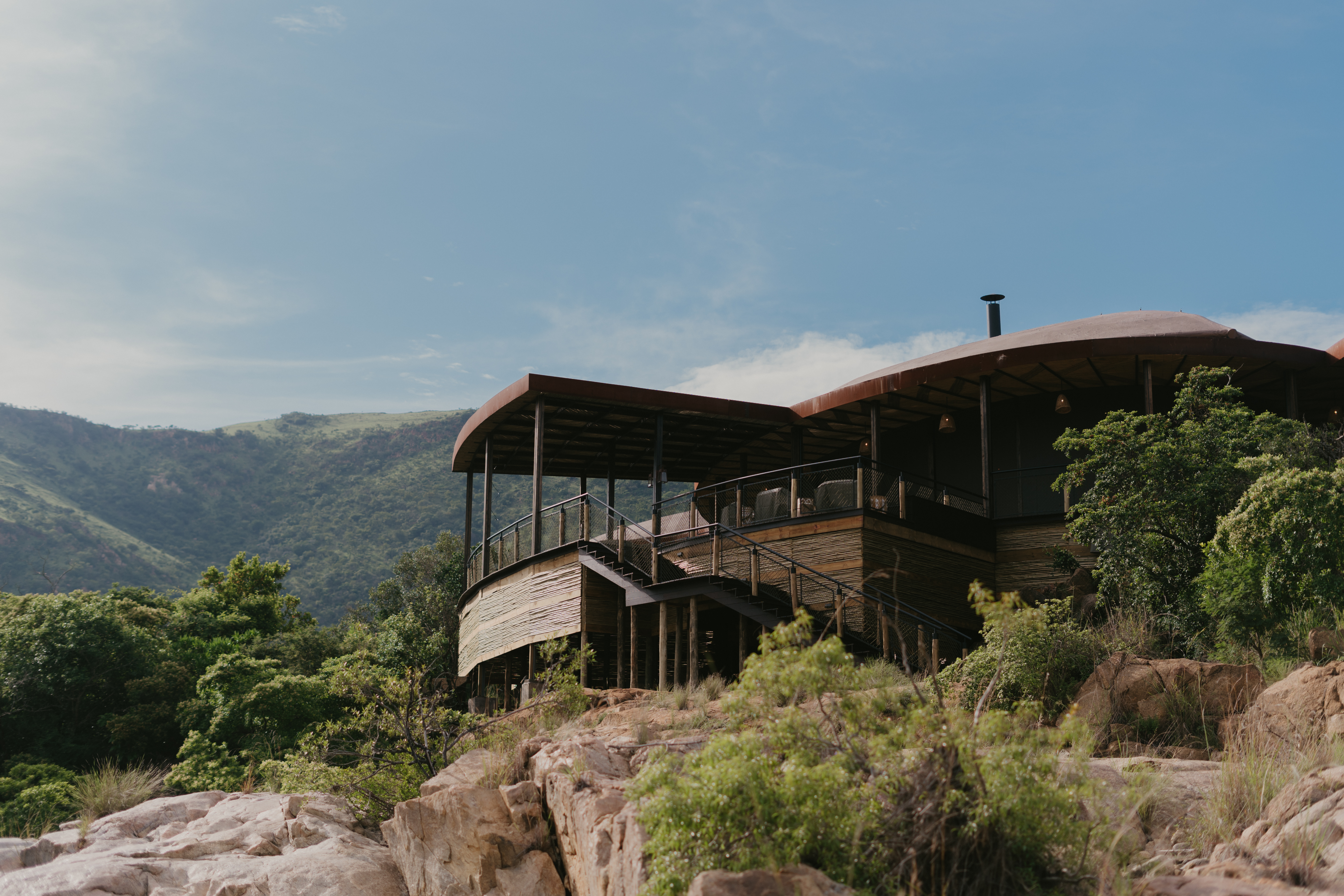
Madwaleni River Lodge at Babanango Game Reserve in Kwa-Zulu Natal

== Lodges ==
=== Madwaleni River Lodge ===
A five-star luxury lodge located along the southern bank of the White Umfolozi River, Madwaleni River Lodge offers 12 luxurious tented units, each with a plunge pool and outdoor seating areas. The name "Madwaleni" comes from an isiZulu phrase meaning "The place of the rock". Designed with sustainable materials, the lodge incorporates elements of Zulu cultural heritage in its architecture.

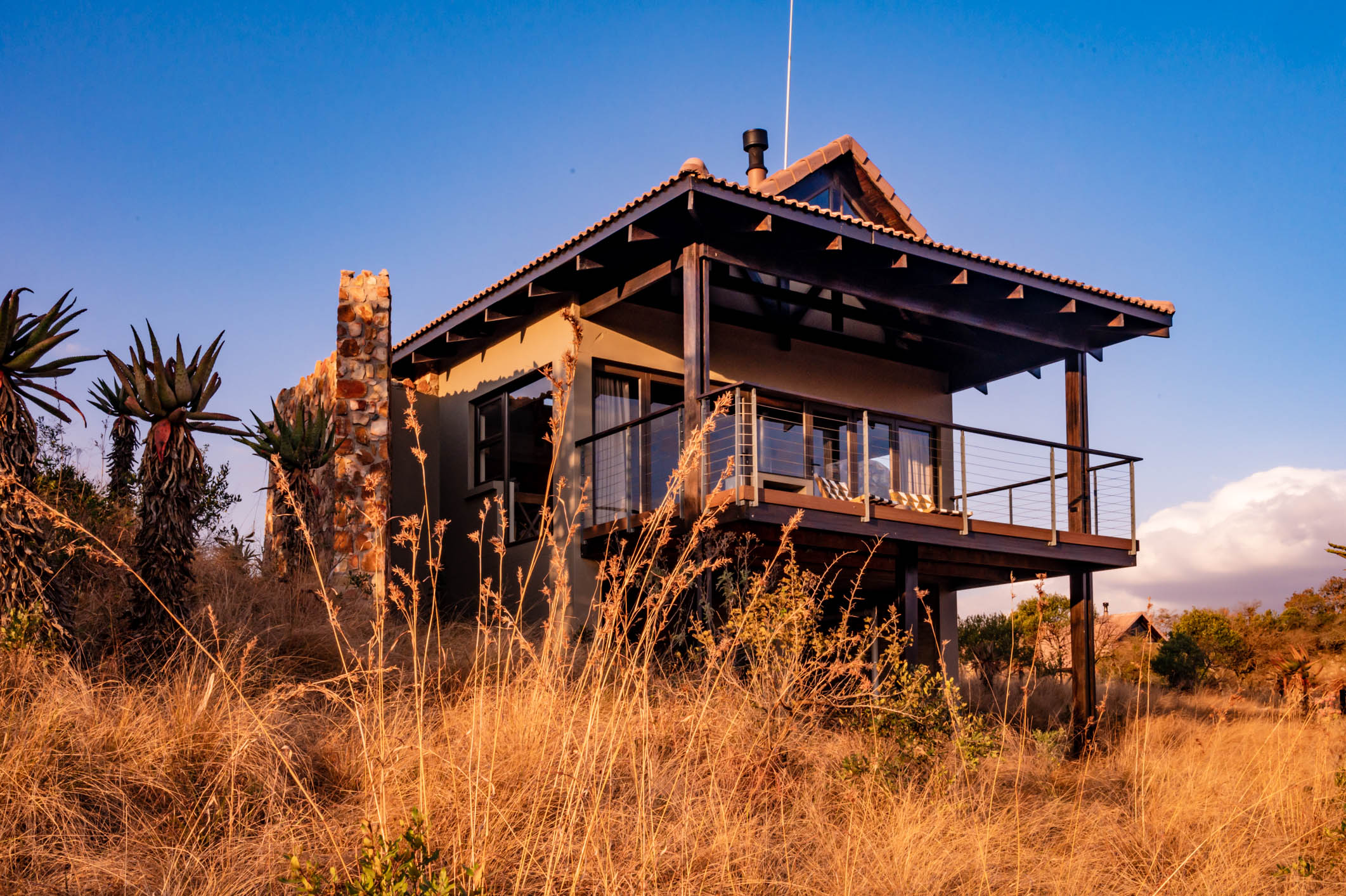
Zulu Rock at Babanango Game Reserve in Kwa-Zulu-Natal

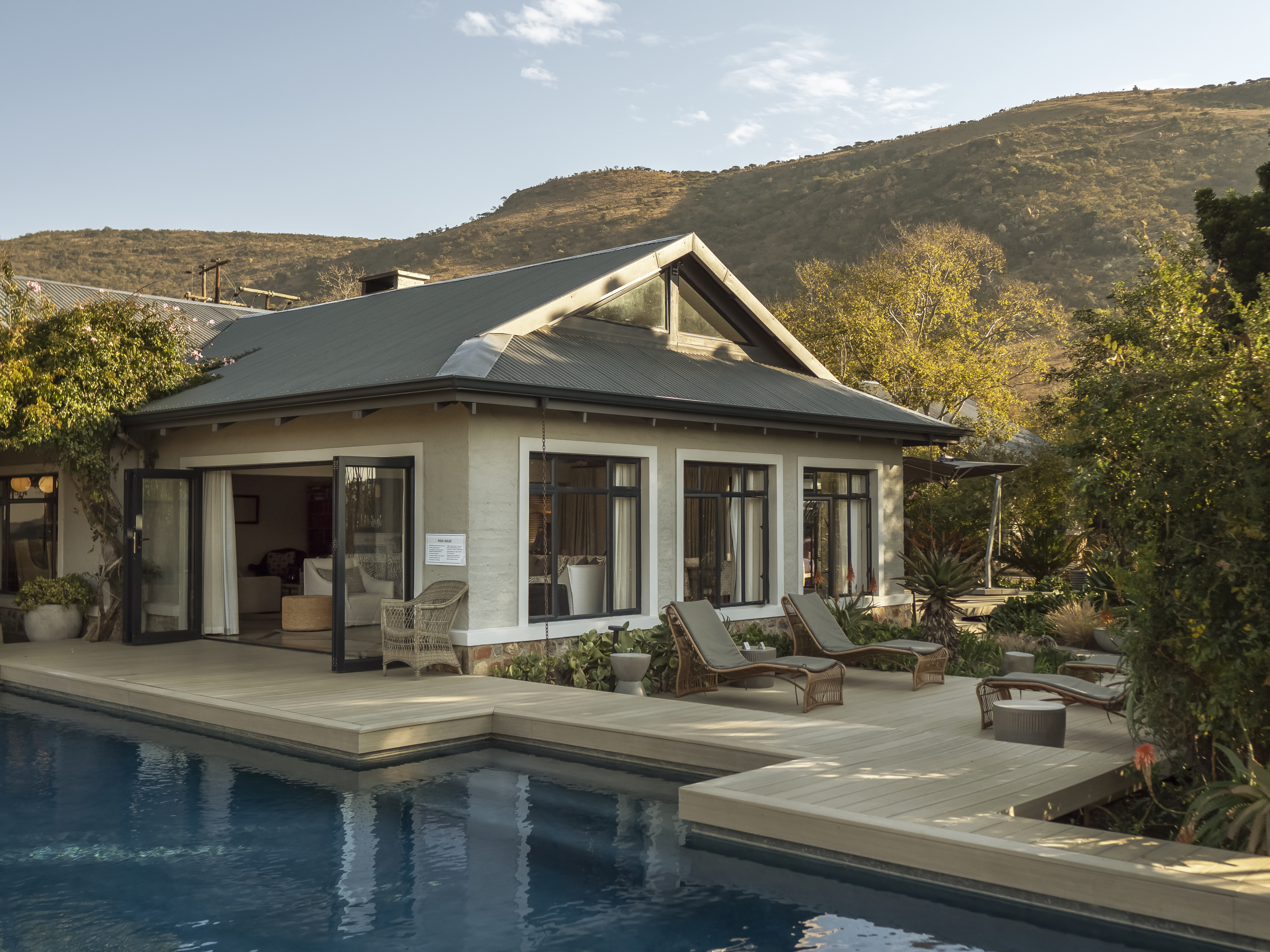
Valley Lodge at Babanango Game Reserve in Kwa-Zulu-Natal

The boma at Madwaleni River Lodge is located on the banks of the White Umfolozi River and functions as an outdoor gathering and dining space. The circular design is influenced by traditional Zulu beehive huts and incorporates woven panels made from invasive black wattle, produced by local artisans. Additional materials such as plaster, recycled timber, and stone were used to integrate the structure with the surrounding landscape.

=== Zulu Rock Lodge ===
Located on a mountainside with views of the White Umfolozi Valley, the four-star Zulu Rock Lodge has seven villa-style suites and a family villa with its own pool.

=== Valley Lodge ===
The four-star Valley Lodge overlooks the Nsubeni River Valley. The lodge comprises nine adjoining luxury rooms which unlike Madwaleni River Lodge and Zulu Rock Lodge, is fenced off for safety.

==== Hilltop House ====
Hilltop House is a standalone, self-catering house at Valley Lodge. Though part of the property, it is fully separate and secluded, with three bedroom sleeping up to six guests, and is well suited to families.

=== Matatane Camp ===
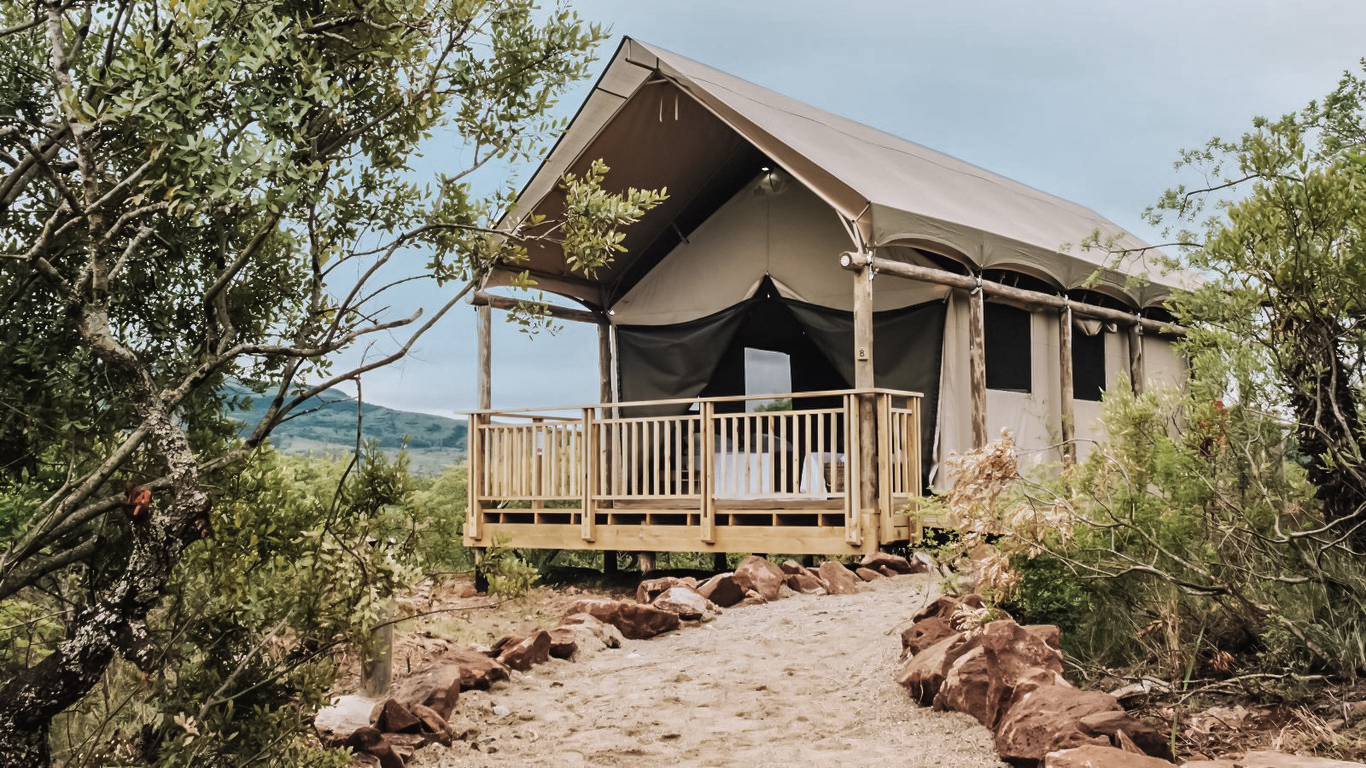
Matatane Camp at Babanango Game Reserve in Kwa-Zulu Natal

Babanango's Matatane Camp is a fenced-off area of 130 hectares. Matatane Camp offers seven basic chalets and two self-contained tented satellite camps for families, school groups, or team building events.

==== Activities ====
- Guided game drives
- Walking safaris
- Battlefield tours
- Ziplining
- Coppermine tours

== See also ==
- List of protected areas of South Africa
