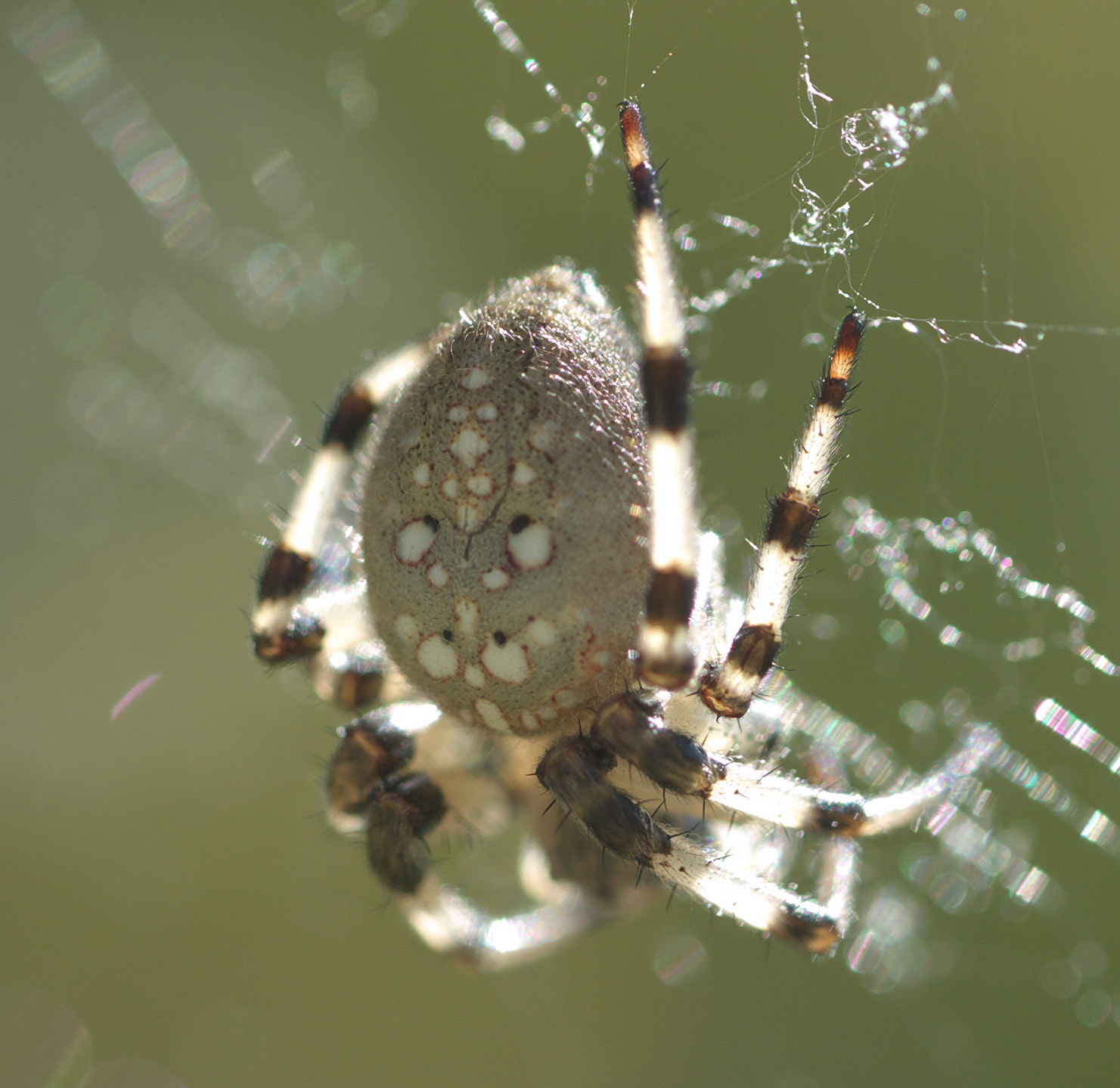

Conservation status
- Secure (NatureServe)

Scientific classification
- Kingdom: Animalia
- Phylum: Arthropoda
- Subphylum: Chelicerata
- Class: Arachnida
- Order: Araneae
- Infraorder: Araneomorphae
- Family: Araneidae
- Genus: Araneus
- Species: A. trifolium

Binomial name
- Araneus trifolium (Hentz, 1847)

= Araneus trifolium =

Species of spider

Araneus trifolium, commonly known as the shamrock orbweaver, is a species of orb-weaving spider in the family Araneidae. It is found throughout the USA and in Canada. It was first described by Nicholas Marcellus Hentz in 1847 and is known for a dorsal abdominal pattern resembling a clover leaf.

== Taxonomy and naming ==
The species has a complex taxonomic history due to its high degree of color polymorphism. Nicholas Marcellus Hentz originally described the species as Epeira trifolium in 1847. During the late 19th century, several variants were described as separate species before being synonymized under A. trifolium. These include Epeira septiclavata and Epeira gemma.

The specific epithet trifolium (Latin for "three-leaf") refers to the dorsal abdominal pattern, which resembles a clover leaf.

== Description ==
Araneus trifolium is a relatively large orb-weaver with considerable variation in coloration. Adult females measure approximately 9.0 to 20.0 mm in body length. The abdomen is large and nearly spherical, and ranges in color from pale white and yellow to green, maroon, or orange. The dorsal surface typically bears a pattern of several symmetrical pale spots.

The legs are annulated, with alternating dark and light bands. Males are smaller, measuring approximately 4.0 to 8.0 mm, and have a more slender abdomen and less conspicuous coloration.

In laboratory settings, identification often relies on the structure of the female epigynum, which includes a long, wrinkled scape characteristic of members of the diadematus group.

== Distribution ==
The species is widely distributed across North America. Its range extends from Alaska to California along the Pacific coast and from Newfoundland to Pennsylvania along the Atlantic coast, with records across the Great Plains. It is most commonly reported from the northern United States and southern Canada, although it has also been documented in states such as Texas and Arizona.

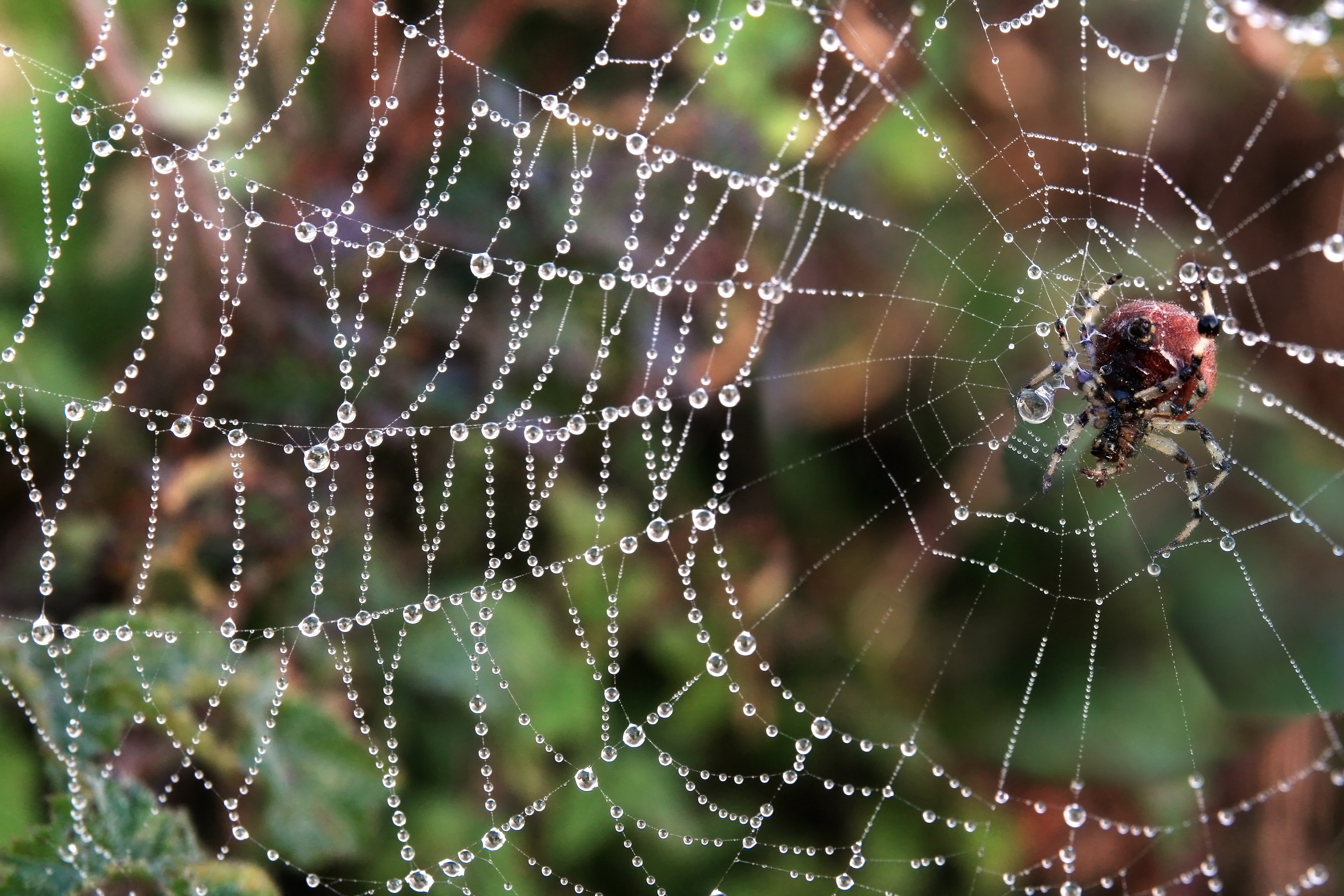
The web structure of Araneus trifolium.

== Web structure and behavior ==
Araneus trifolium constructs large orb webs, typically positioned between 0.5 and 2 meters above the ground. Webs are often attached to tall herbaceous vegetation, including species of Solidago and ironweed.

Rather than remaining at the hub of the web, the spider typically occupies a retreat constructed from a folded leaf bound with silk. From this retreat, it maintains contact with the web via a non-sticky signal line, which transmits vibrations produced by captured prey.

== Ecology and foraging behavior ==
Araneus trifolium is a generalist sit-and-wait predator that captures a variety of flying insects. Documented prey includes grasshoppers, bees, and lepidopterans.

It may occur in the same habitats as other orb-weaving spiders, including Argiope trifasciata. Differences in web placement and microhabitat use may reduce direct competition between species.

Field studies have shown that females produce airborne sex pheromones, which are detected by males and are hypothesized to facilitate mate location.

== Life history ==
The life cycle of A. trifolium follows a seasonal pattern typical of temperate North America. Spiderlings emerge in the spring and remain relatively small through early summer. Individuals reach maturity in late summer and autumn, with peak adult abundance occurring in September and October.

Mating occurs in the autumn. Females produce egg sacs containing several hundred eggs, enclosed in dense silk. Adults do not survive winter conditions; the species overwinters in the egg stage, with juveniles emerging the following spring.

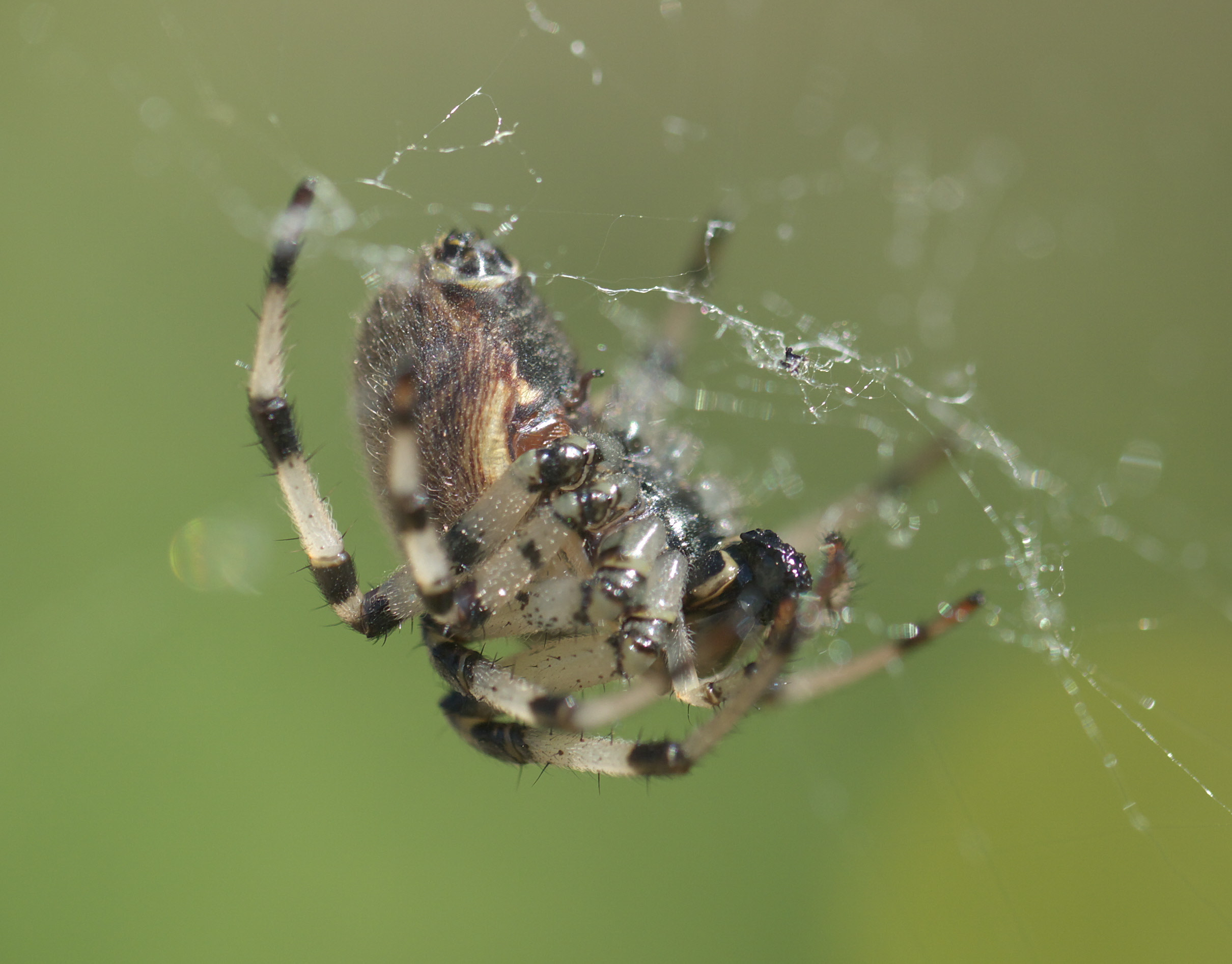
Shamrock Orbweaver, Araneus trifolium, Clallam, WA, USA
