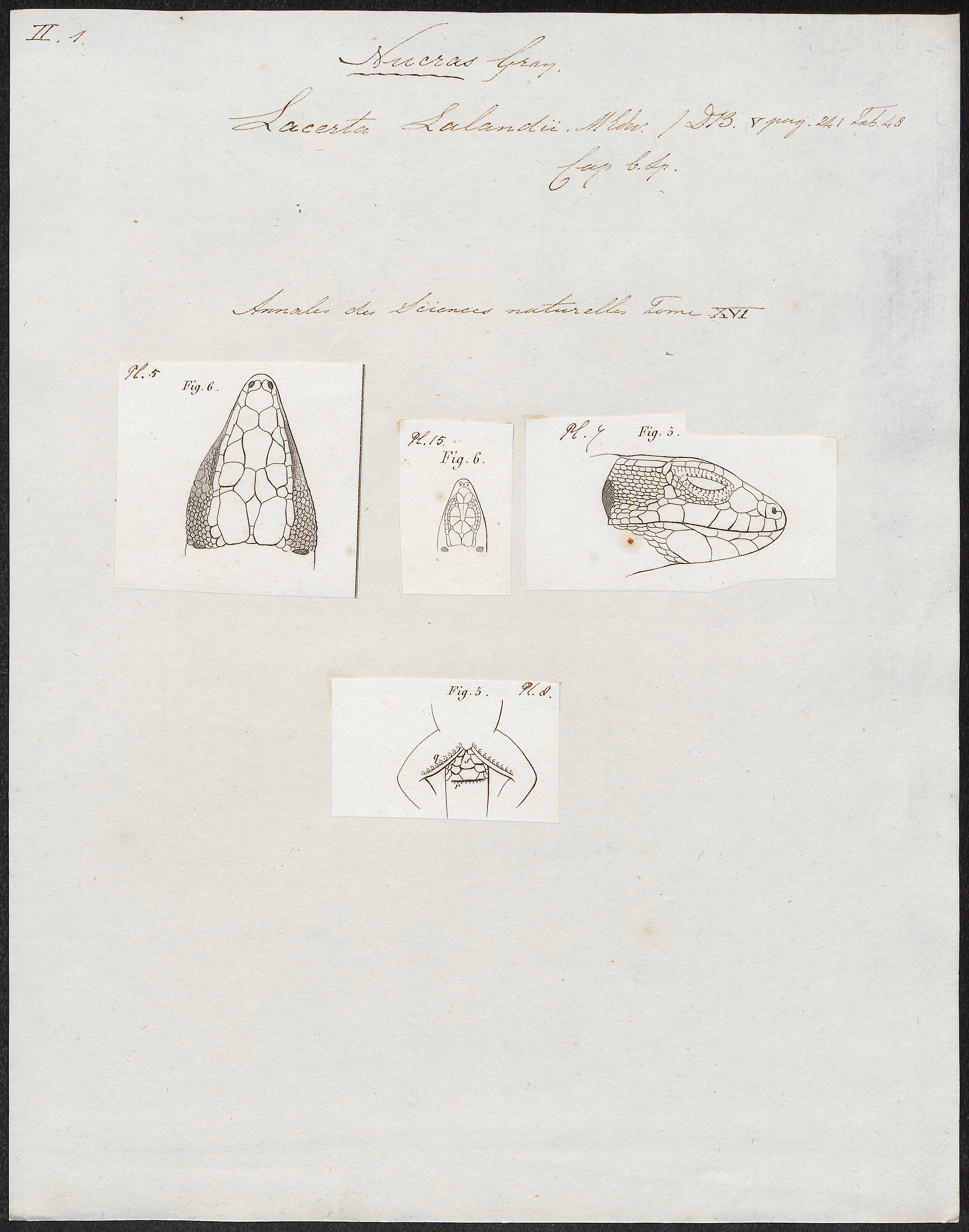

Conservation status
- Least Concern (IUCN 3.1)

Scientific classification
- Kingdom: Animalia
- Phylum: Chordata
- Class: Reptilia
- Order: Squamata
- Family: Lacertidae
- Genus: Nucras
- Species: N. lalandii

Binomial name
- Nucras lalandii (Milne-Edwards, 1829)

Synonyms
- Lacerta lalandii Milne-Edwards, 1829; Eremias (Nucras) lalandii — Gray, 1838; Lacerta delalandii — A.M.C. Duméril & Bibron, 1839; Bettaia delalandii — Bedriaga, 1886; Nucras delalandii — Boulenger, 1887; Nucras lalandii — Boycott, 1992

= Nucras lalandii =

Species of lizard

Nucras lalandii, also known commonly as Delalande's sandveld lizard, Delalande's spotted lizard, and Laland's lizard, is a species of wall lizard in the family of true lizards (Lacertidae). The species is native to Southern Africa.

== Etymology ==
The specific name, lalandii, is in honor of French Naturalist Pierre Antoine Delalande.

== Geographic range ==
L. lalandii is found in Eswatini, Lesotho, and South Africa.

== Habitat ==
The preferred natural habitats of N. lalandii are grassland, shrubland, and savanna, at altitudes from sea level to 2,300 m (7,500 ft).

== Description ==
N. lalandii is a large and heavy-bodied species for its genus. Adults usually have a snout-to-vent length (SVL) of 7.5–9.5 cm (3.0–3.7 in), but can grow to slightly more than 10 cm (3.9 in) in SVL.

== Behavior ==
A terrestrial species, N. lalandii shelters under rocks or in burrows.

== Reproduction ==
N. lalandii is oviparous. Clutch size is 3–9 eggs. Each egg measures on average 11 mm x 17.5 mm (0.43 in x 0.69 in). The eggs hatch in late January and early February. Each hatchling measures about 8 cm (3.1 in) in total length (including tail).
