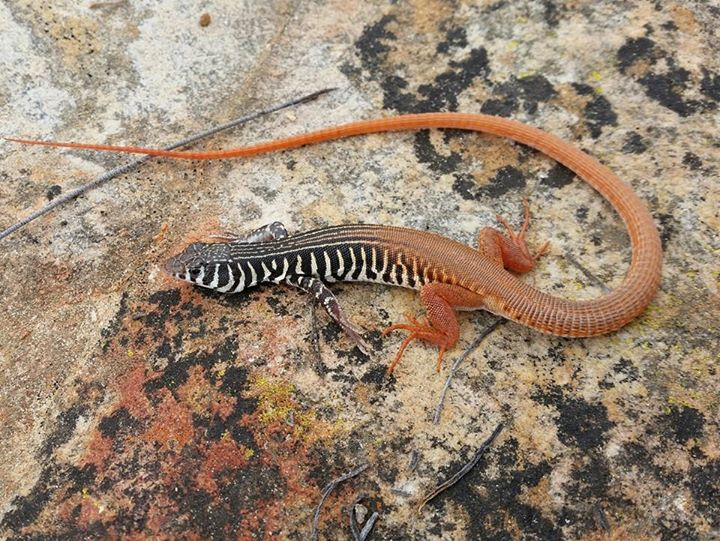

Conservation status
- Least Concern (IUCN 3.1)

Scientific classification
- Kingdom: Animalia
- Phylum: Chordata
- Class: Reptilia
- Order: Squamata
- Suborder: Lacertoidea
- Family: Lacertidae
- Genus: Nucras
- Species: N. tessellata

Binomial name
- Nucras tessellata (Smith, 1838)

= Nucras tessellata =

Species of lizard

Nucras tessellata, also known as the western sandveld lizard, striped sandveld lizard, tiger lizard, striped sand lizard or banded sand lizard, is a species of lizard in the family Lacertidae. It is native to western Southern Africa and is found in western South Africa (Western Cape and Northern Cape provinces), southwestern Botswana, and southern and central Namibia north to Khomas Highland. Its range includes several protected areas, including Tankwa Karoo National Park and ǀAi-ǀAis/Richtersveld Transfrontier Park.

== Habitat ==
Nucras tessellata is associated with several habitat types such as savanna, karoo, and fynbos at elevations of 20–1,500 m (66–4,921 ft) above sea level. Although secretive, it can often be found in dry river beds or sandy areas with scattered rocks.

== Description ==
Nucras tessellata is a slender, whip-tailed lizard about 25 cm long. The tail accounts for about two-thirds of its length and is used as a rudder during its lightning-fast dashes. In breeding colours, it is strongly striped in black and white over its forequarters, becoming bright orange-brown over its hindquarters and tail. Its non-breeding colours display striping down the entire length of the body. The lizard is most active during morning and evening, when it hunts for its preferred prey, scorpions. Its diet is supplemented by spiders, grasshoppers, termites and beetles, often excavated from their daytime retreats.

== Bibliography ==
- A review of the Nucras tessellata group (Sauria: Lacertidae) (Arnoldia) by Donald G Broadley (1972)
- Field Guide to the Snakes and Other Reptiles of Southern Africa by Bill Branch (1998)
