= Nucras damarana =

Scientific classification
- Domain: Eukaryota
- Kingdom: Animalia
- Phylum: Chordata
- Class: Reptilia
- Order: Squamata
- Family: Lacertidae
- Genus: Nucras
- Species: N. damarana

Binomial name
- Nucras damarana Parker, 1936

Species of lizard

Nucras damarana is a wall lizard in the family of true lizards (Lacertidae). It is found in Namibia.
