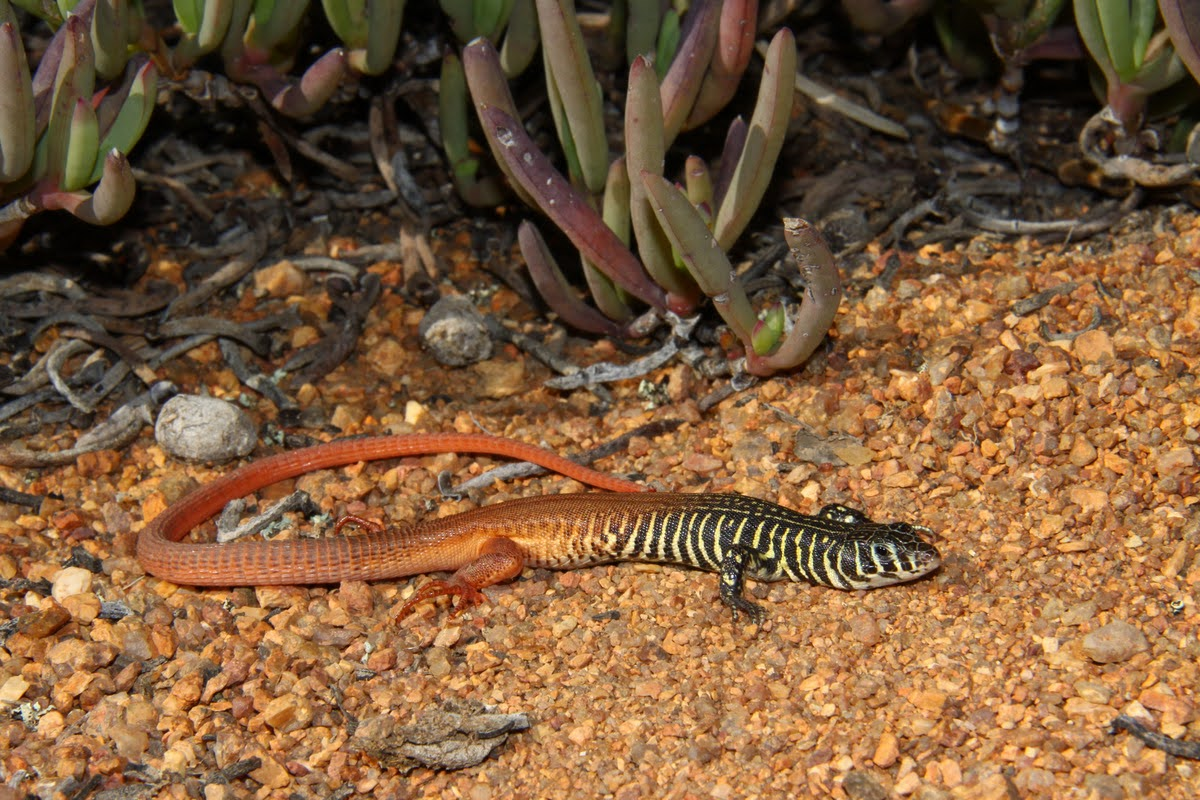
- Nucras tessellata

Scientific classification
- Kingdom: Animalia
- Phylum: Chordata
- Class: Reptilia
- Order: Squamata
- Family: Lacertidae
- Subfamily: Lacertinae
- Genus: Nucras; Gray, 1845

Species
- See text

= Nucras =

Genus of lizards

Nucras is a genus of African lacertid lizards, commonly called sandveld lizards.

== Species ==
The following 13 species are recognized as being valid.

- Nucras aurantiaca Bauer, Childers, Broeckhoven, and Mouton, 2019
- Nucras boulengeri Neumann, 1900 - Uganda savannah lizard, Boulenger's scrub lizard
- Nucras broadleyi Branch, Conradie, Vaz-Pinto, & Tolley, 2019 - Angolan sandveld lizard
- Nucras caesicaudata Broadley, 1972 - bluetailed sandveld lizard, bluetail scrub lizard
- Nucras damarana Parker, 1936
- Nucras holubi (Steindachner, 1882) - Holub's sandveld lizard
- Nucras intertexta (A. Smith, 1838) - spotted sandveld lizard
- Nucras lalandii (Milne-Edwards, 1829) - Delalande's sandveld lizard, Laland's lizard, Delalande's spotted lizard
- Nucras livida (A. Smith, 1838) - Karoo sandveld lizard
- Nucras ornata (Gray, 1864) - ornate sandveld lizard, ornate scrub lizard
- Nucras scalaris Laurent, 1964 - scaled sandveld lizard
- Nucras taeniolata (A. Smith, 1838) - Albany sandveld lizard, striped scrub lizard
- Nucras tessellata (A. Smith, 1838) - western sandveld lizard, striped sandveld lizard, tiger lizard, striped sand lizard, banded sand lizard

Nota bene: A binomial authority in parentheses indicates that the species was originally described in a genus other than Nucras.
