= Game reserve =

Area of land set aside for controlled hunting wild animals

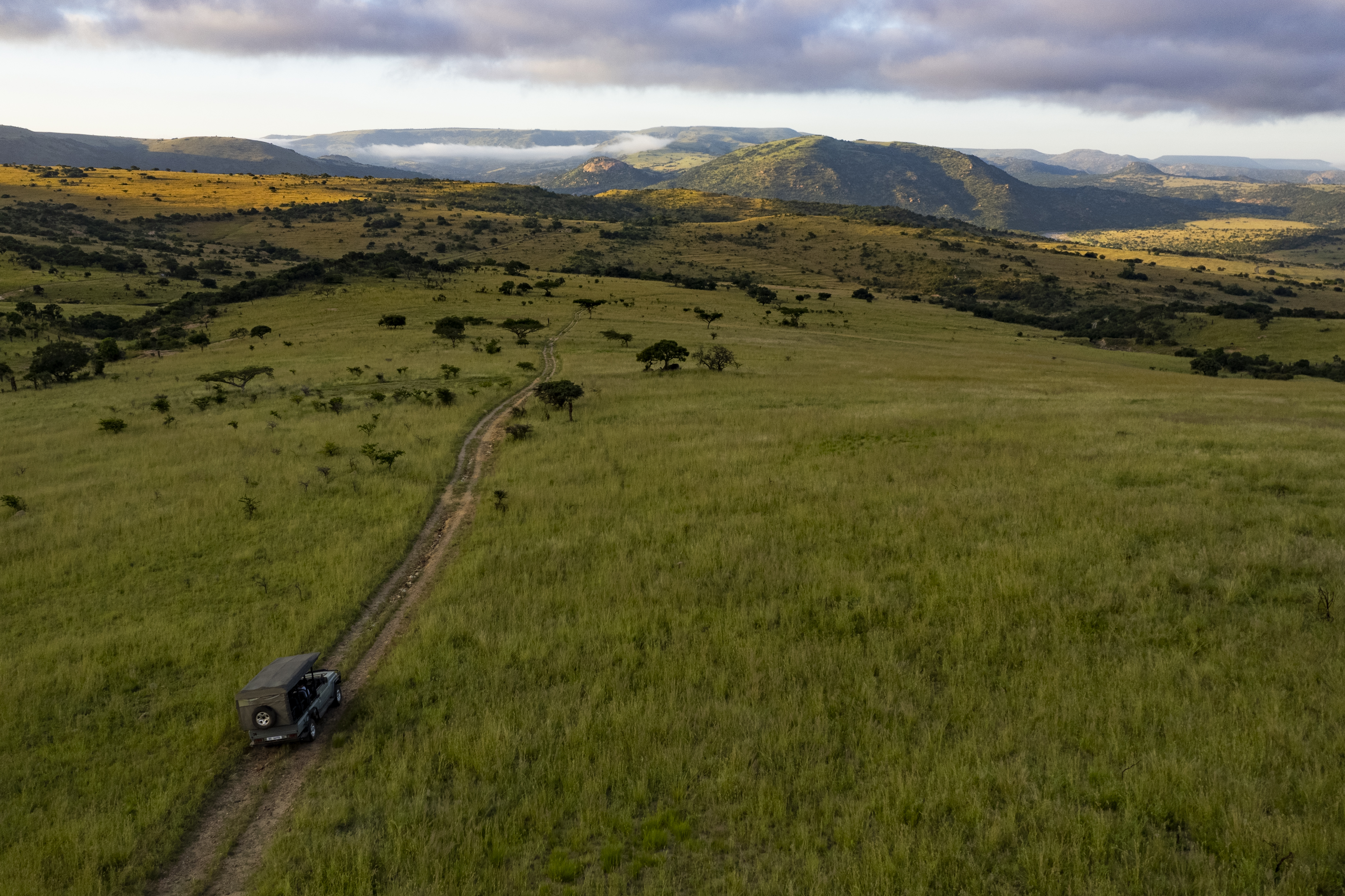
Babanango Game Reserve in South Africa

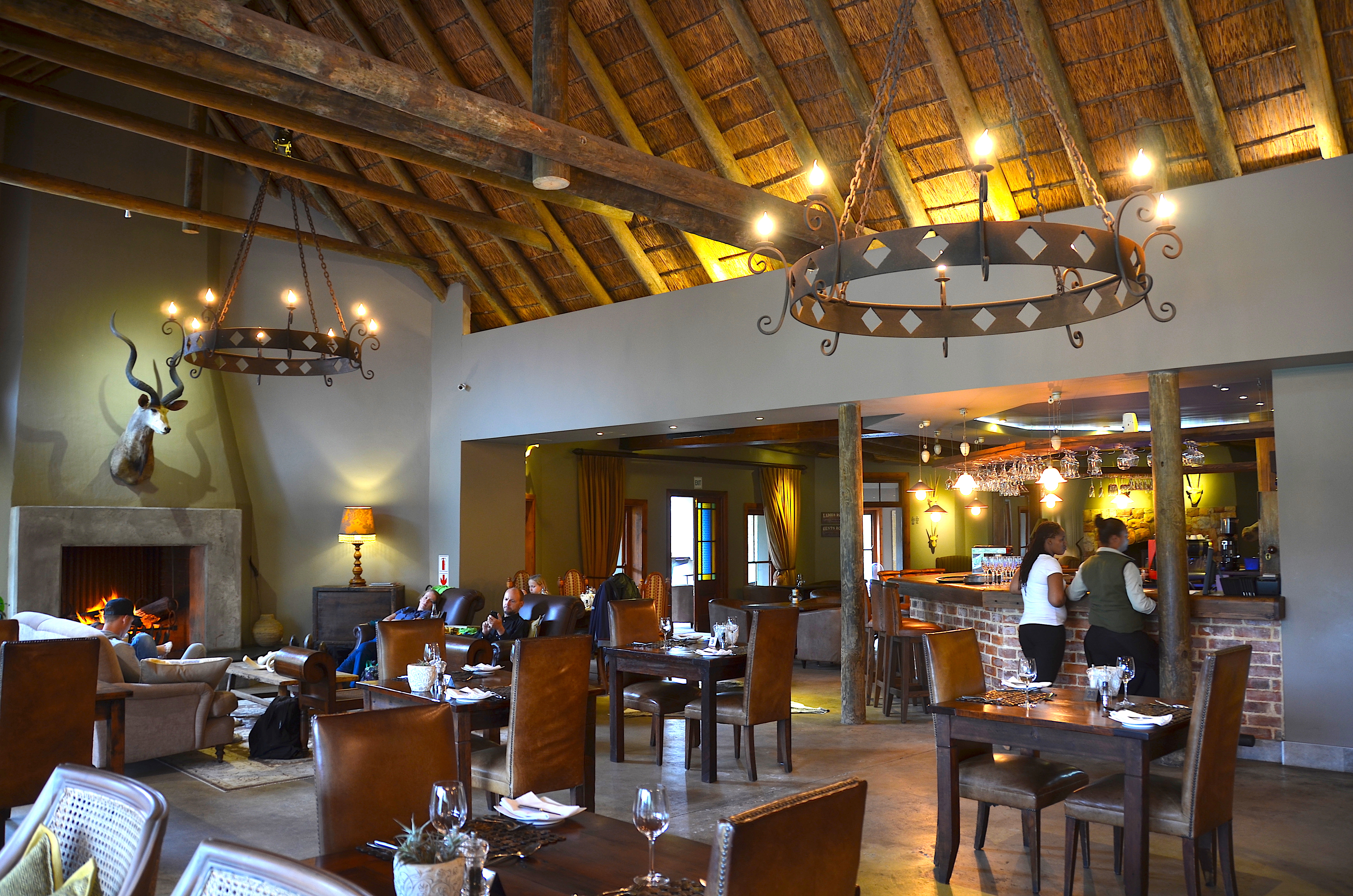
Lodge at Botlierskop game reserve in South Africa (2015)

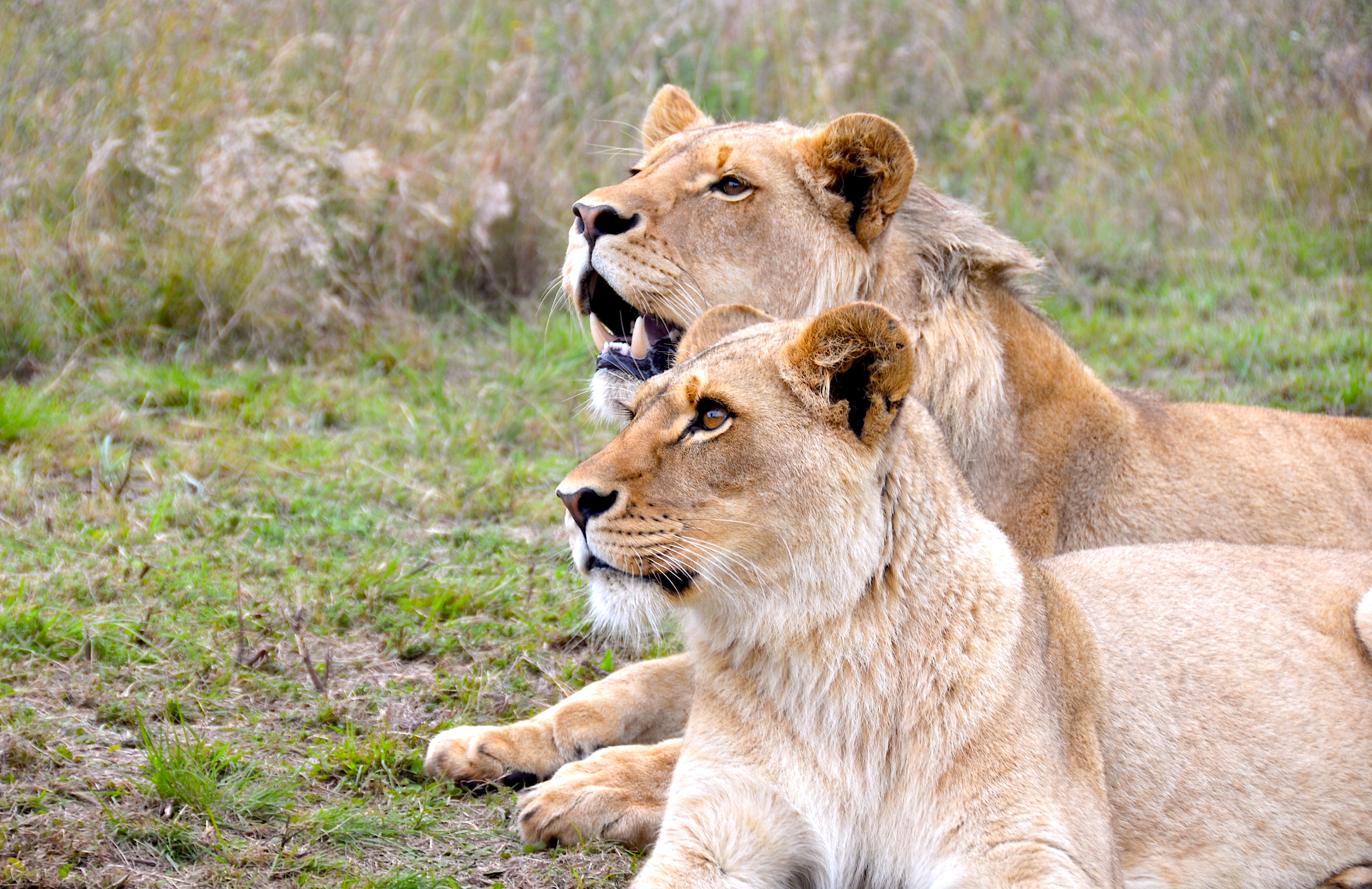
Two lions at Botlierskop game reserve

A game reserve (also known as a game park) is a large area of land where wild animals are hunted in a controlled way for sport. If hunting is prohibited, a game reserve may be considered a nature reserve; however, the focus of a game reserve is specifically the animals (fauna), whereas a nature reserve is also, if not equally, concerned with all aspects of native biota of the area (plants, animals, fungi, etc.).

Many game reserves are located in Africa. Most are open to the public, and tourists commonly take sightseeing safaris. Historically, among the best-known hunting targets were the so-called Big Five game in Africa: rhinoceros (white rhinoceros as well as black rhinoceros), elephant, Cape buffalo, leopard, and lion, named so because of the difficulty and danger in hunting them.

In a game reserve, ecosystems are protected and conservation is usually key. Indigenous wildlife in its natural habitat help in providing an environment where growth in numbers at a natural rate can occur.

Some game reserves contain several ecosystems, ranging from valley bushveld, savannah grassland and fynbos to riverine forest and acacia woodland; this provides a dramatic improvement on the types of wildlife that are present and the numerous species of birds that thrive in these environments.

== Wildlife conservation ==
Wildlife conservation is a costly endeavor for most African countries. One of the more common forms of generating income to establish a sustainable economy to provide for wildlife conservation is known as wildlife viewing tourism. However, this attraction still does not generate enough to establish wildlife conservation. For regions that suffer political and economic instability, sustainable trophy hunting may be the only feasible source of sufficient income. Once established, another aspect to consider is the management of the land being used for hunting. Naturally, wildlife decreases with the increase of human presence which puts a strain on the quality of hunting. Generally, leases for hunting concessions are set up to last for multiple years all at once to encourage hunting operators to continue to manage the land for hunting; however, as the quality of hunting decreases, leases are shortened, causing an overall negative impact on the economy.

Many African countries benefit from community-based conservation. This concept explores the relationship between wildlife and people and the notion that conserving every animal is also not sustainable because certain animals threaten human lives and crops. One of the biggest arguments in support of community-based conservation is that allowing people to gain economic benefits from wildlife incentivizes conservation. One country that benefits from adopting this strategy is Zambia. The Zambian government established a wildlife conservation fund to act as the responsible player for redistributing funds from the hunting industry into wildlife conservation and community development.

== Ethical problems ==
Using game hunting as a conservation tool has negative perceptions that impose harsh restrictions across several countries in Africa. Activities that induce hunting bans include canned hunting, shooting young or uncommon animals, shooting from vehicles, and the use of bait, spotlights and hounds, all hunting practices that raise ethical problems.

== See also ==
- Chase (land)
- Deer park (England)
- Nature reserve
- Refuge (ecology)
- Wildlife photography
