= Nucras scalaris =

Conservation status
- Least Concern (IUCN 3.1)

Scientific classification
- Kingdom: Animalia
- Phylum: Chordata
- Class: Reptilia
- Order: Squamata
- Family: Lacertidae
- Genus: Nucras
- Species: N. scalaris

Binomial name
- Nucras scalaris Laurent, 1964

Species of lizard

Nucras scalaris, the scaled sandveld lizard, is a wall lizard in the family of true lizards (Lacertidae). It is endemic to Angola.
