= Nucras aurantiaca =

Scientific classification
- Kingdom: Animalia
- Phylum: Chordata
- Class: Reptilia
- Order: Squamata
- Family: Lacertidae
- Genus: Nucras
- Species: N. aurantiaca

Binomial name
- Nucras aurantiaca Bauer, Childers, Broeckhoven, and Mouton, 2019

Species of lizard

Nucras aurantiaca, the Lambert's Bay sandveld lizard, is a wall lizard in the family of true lizards (Lacertidae). It is found in South Africa.
