= Nucras broadleyi =

Scientific classification
- Kingdom: Animalia
- Phylum: Chordata
- Class: Reptilia
- Order: Squamata
- Family: Lacertidae
- Genus: Nucras
- Species: N. broadleyi

Binomial name
- Nucras broadleyi Branch, Conradie, Vaz-Pinto, & Tolley, 2019

Species of lizard

Nucras broadleyi, also known as the Angolan sandveld lizard, is a wall lizard in the family of true lizards (Lacertidae). It is found in Angola.
