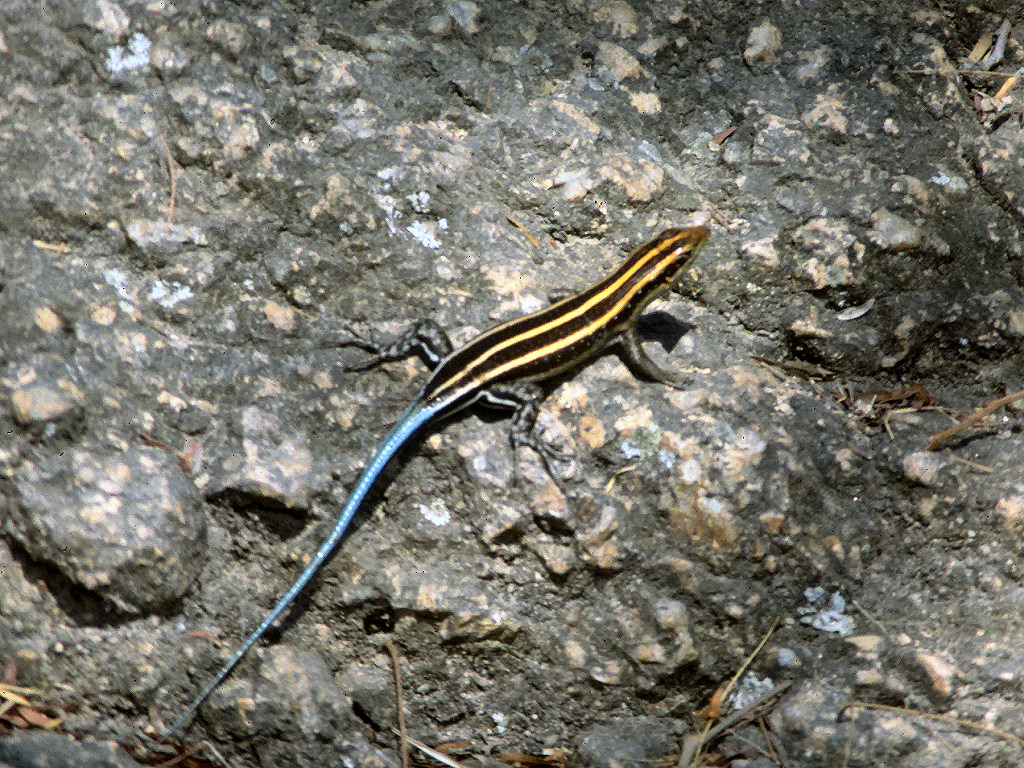

Scientific classification
- Kingdom: Animalia
- Phylum: Chordata
- Class: Reptilia
- Order: Squamata
- Suborder: Lacertoidea
- Family: Lacertidae
- Genus: Nucras
- Species: N. caesicaudata

Binomial name
- Nucras caesicaudata Broadley, 1972

= Nucras caesicaudata =

Species of lizard

Nucras caesicaudata, the bluetailed sandveld lizard or bluetail scrub lizard, is a wall lizard in the family of true lizards (Lacertidae). It is found in southern Mozambique, southwestern Zimbabwe and the extreme northeast of South Africa. The lizard can clearly be distinguished because of its distinctive blue tail. Little has been discovered about its anatomy and way of life as it is rarely encountered, but it lives in the sandveld, a dry, sandy, savanna ecoregion.
