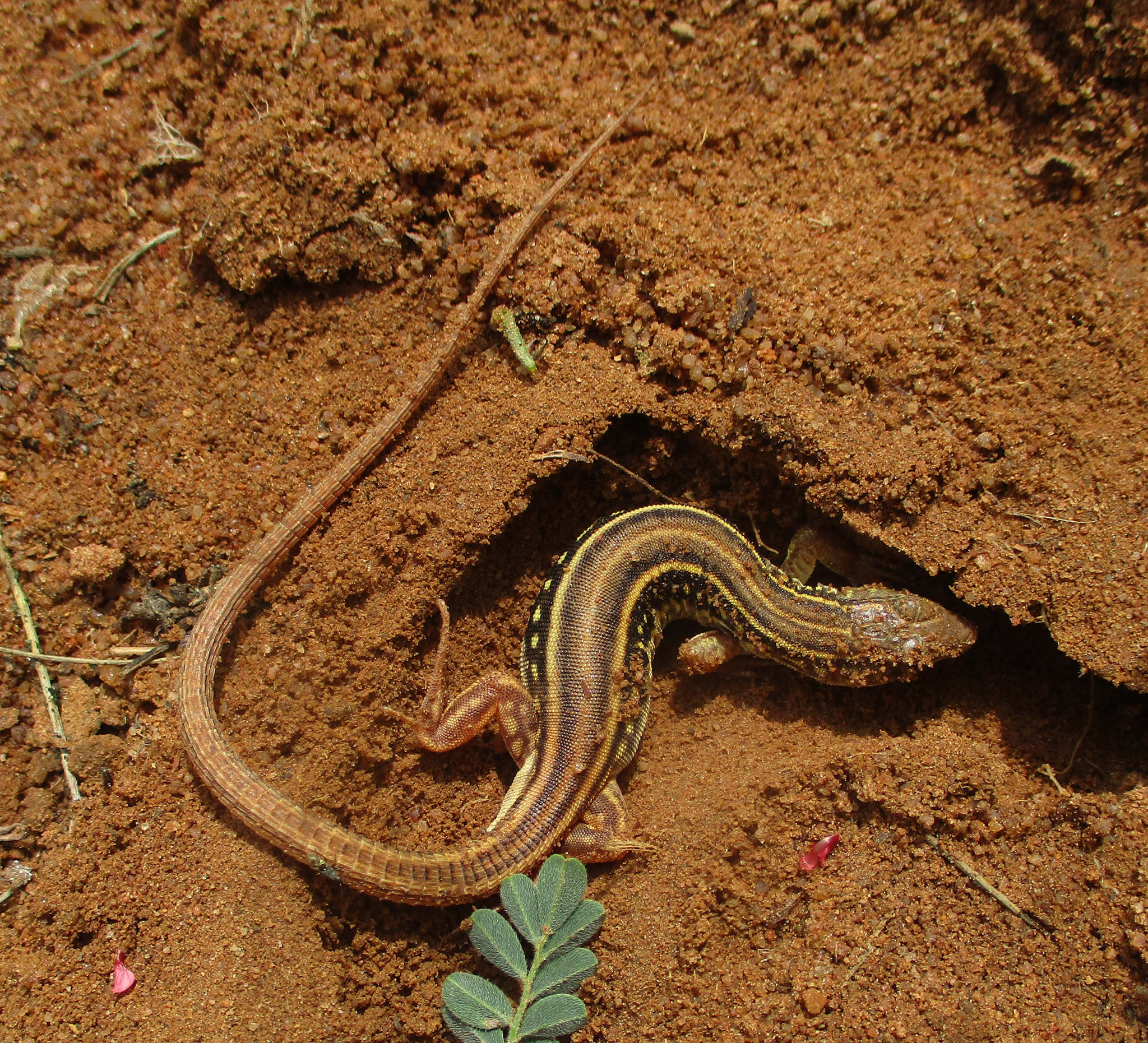

Scientific classification
- Domain: Eukaryota
- Kingdom: Animalia
- Phylum: Chordata
- Class: Reptilia
- Order: Squamata
- Family: Lacertidae
- Genus: Nucras
- Species: N. holubi

Binomial name
- Nucras holubi (Steindachner, 1882)

= Nucras holubi =

Species of lizard

Nucras holubi, Holub's sandveld lizard, is a wall lizard in the family of true lizards (Lacertidae). It is found in southern Africa, excluding the southwestern and western Cape Province, and Little and Great Namaqualand.
