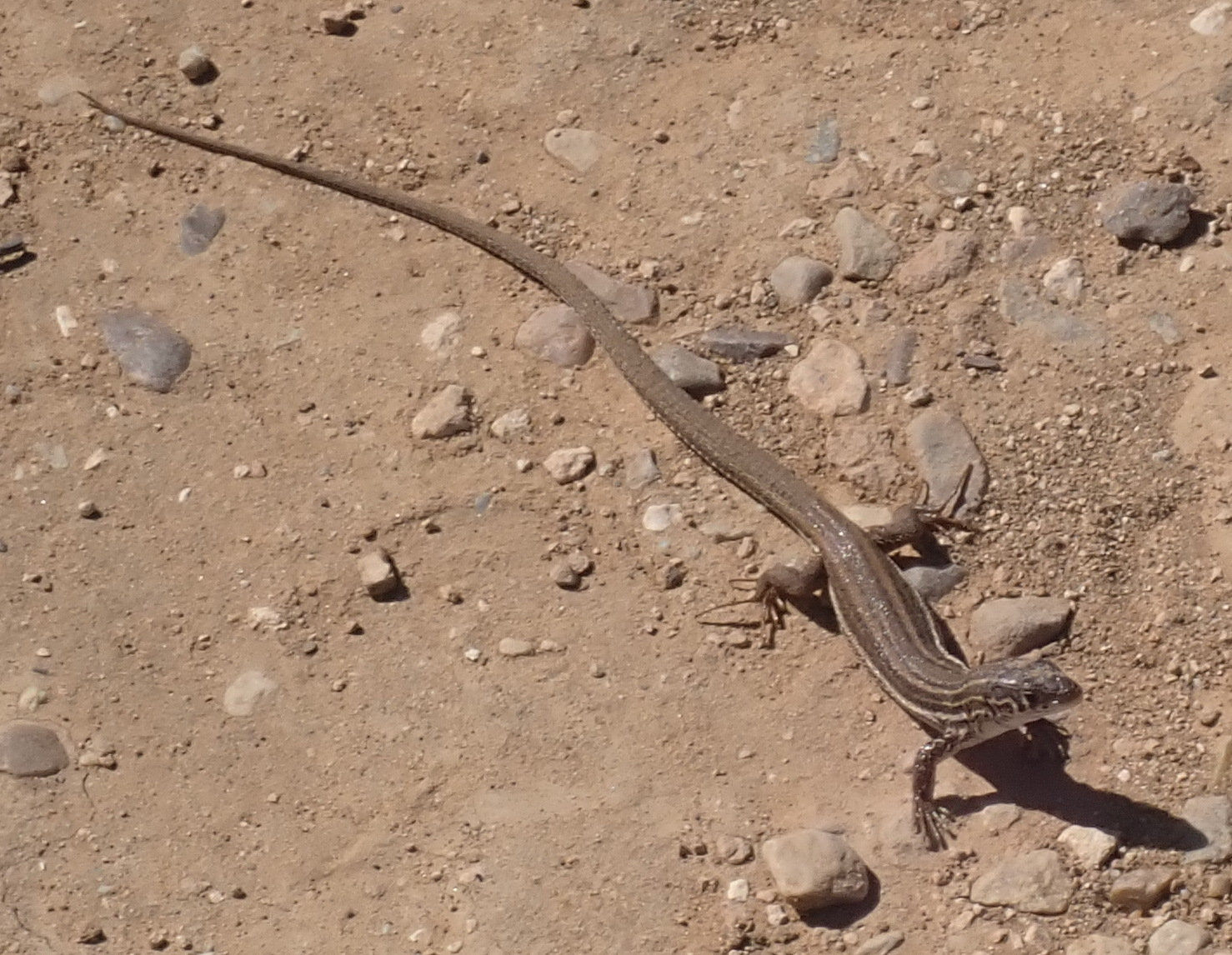
- Found in South Africa

Conservation status
- Least Concern (IUCN 3.1)

Scientific classification
- Kingdom: Animalia
- Phylum: Chordata
- Class: Reptilia
- Order: Squamata
- Suborder: Lacertoidea
- Family: Lacertidae
- Genus: Nucras
- Species: N. taeniolata

Binomial name
- Nucras taeniolata (Smith, 1838)

= Nucras taeniolata =

Species of lizard

Nucras taeniolata, the Albany sandveld lizard, striped sandveld lizard, or striped scrub lizard, is a wall lizard in the family of true lizards (Lacertidae). It is endemic to South Africa.
