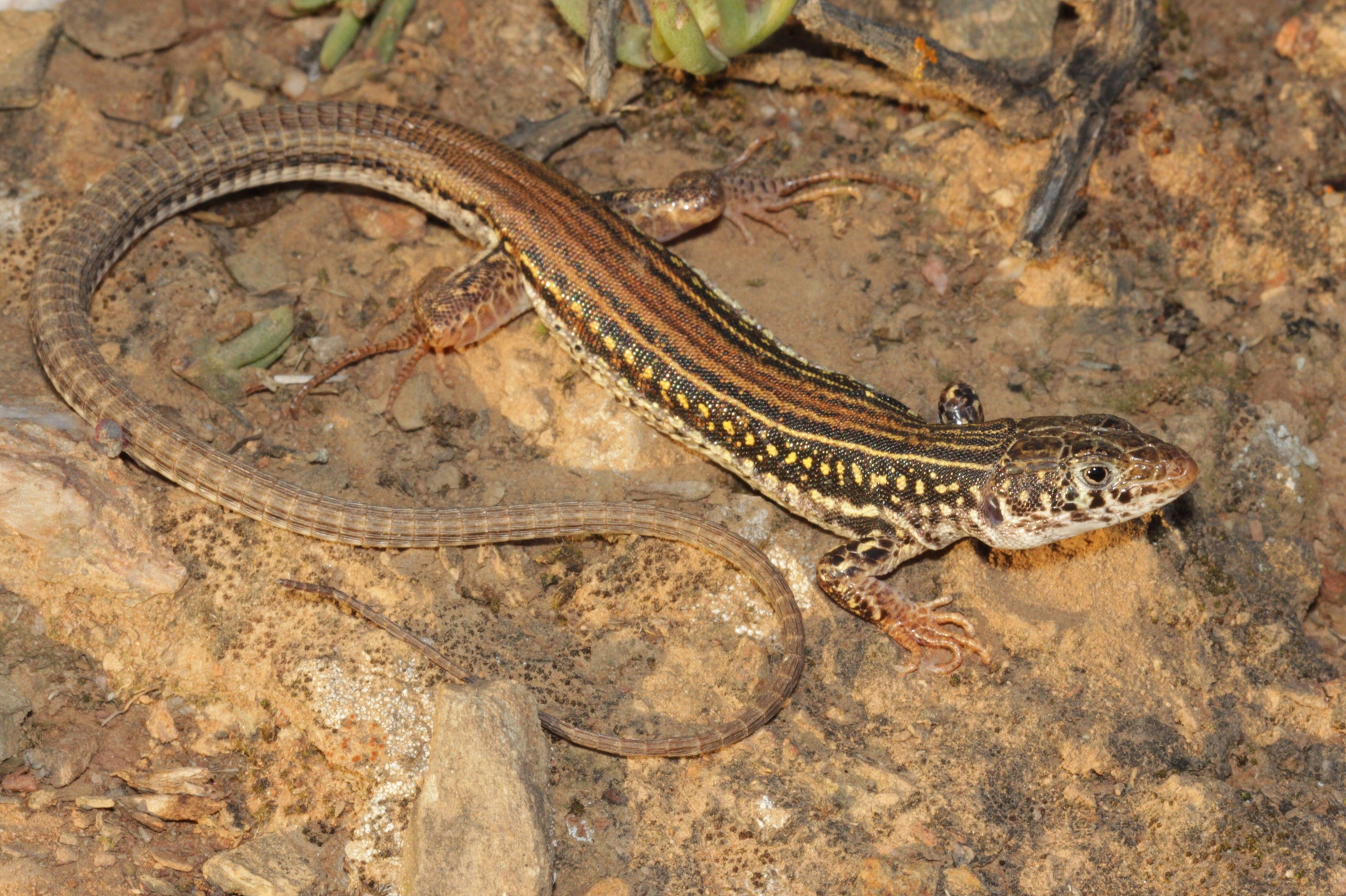

Conservation status
- Least Concern (IUCN 3.1)

Scientific classification
- Kingdom: Animalia
- Phylum: Chordata
- Class: Reptilia
- Order: Squamata
- Suborder: Lacertoidea
- Family: Lacertidae
- Genus: Nucras
- Species: N. livida

Binomial name
- Nucras livida (Smith, 1838)

= Nucras livida =

Species of lizard

Nucras livida, the Karoo sandveld lizard, is a species of wall lizard in the family of true lizards (Lacertidae). It is found in Namibia and South Africa.
