= Babanango =

- Location within KwaZulu-Natal Location within South Africa
- Coordinates: 28°22′S 31°05′E
- Country: South Africa
- Province: KwaZulu-Natal
- District: Zululand
- Municipality: Ulundi

Area
  - Total: 1.41 km^{2} (0.54 sq mi)

Population (2011)
  - Total: 1,886
  - Density: 1,340/km^{2} (3,460/sq mi)

Racial makeup (2011)
  - Black African: 98.8%
  - Coloured: 0.3%
  - Indian/Asian: 0.3%
  - White: 0.3%
  - Other: 0.3%

First languages (2011)
  - Zulu: 96.9%
  - English: 1.2%
  - Other: 1.9%
- Time zone: UTC+2 (SAST)
- PO box: 3850
- Area code: 035

Babanango is a small town located about 58 kilometers north-west of Melmoth in the KwaZulu-Natal Province of South Africa. Founded in 1904, the town takes its name from the nearby stream and mountain. It is home to the recently established big five game reserve, Babanango Game Reserve, which has brought the community together as a conservation initiative.

== Etymology ==
The exact origin of the name 'Babanango' is uncertain, and many possible origins have been proposed. The commonly accepted version comes from the Zulu words 'baba nango'. The popular story goes that many years ago a small Buthelezi child got lost on the slopes of the mist-shrouded hill and when an elder brother found him he shouted, "baba, nango", meaning "Father, there he is".

== History ==
eMakhosini, located in the Mkhumbane Valley on the banks of a tributary of the White Umfolozi River near the town of Babanango, is the site of one of Zulu king King Dingane kaSenzangakhona's great royal kraals, UmGungundlovu, where Piet Retief and his Voortrekkers were massacred in 1838. The name "Mgungundlovu" is said to mean "the place of the elephant", and the name eMakhosini means "At the place of the chiefs". The settlement of Babanango was originally part of a land grant to European farmers in 1885 by King Dinizulu for their support after his father's death the year before.

== Culture ==
The town's name is the title of the song "Baba Nango" on Juluka's sixth album Work For All.
