= Nucras intertexta =

Scientific classification
- Domain: Eukaryota
- Kingdom: Animalia
- Phylum: Chordata
- Class: Reptilia
- Order: Squamata
- Family: Lacertidae
- Genus: Nucras
- Species: N. intertexta

Binomial name
- Nucras intertexta (Smith, 1838)

Species of lizard

Nucras intertexta, the spotted sandveld lizard, is a wall lizard in the family of true lizards (Lacertidae). It is found in Namibia, Botswana, Zimbabwe, Mozambique, and South Africa.
