= Nucras boulengeri =

Conservation status
- Least Concern (IUCN 3.1)

Scientific classification
- Kingdom: Animalia
- Phylum: Chordata
- Class: Reptilia
- Order: Squamata
- Family: Lacertidae
- Genus: Nucras
- Species: N. boulengeri

Binomial name
- Nucras boulengeri Neumann, 1900

Synonyms
- Nucras boulengeri Neumann, 1900; Nucras emini Boulenger, 1907; Nucras kilosae Loveridge, 1922; Nucras boulengeri — Loveridge, 1957; Nucras boulengeri kilosae — Bischoff, 1991; Nucras boulengeri — Haagner et al., 2000

Species of lizard

Nucras boulengeri, also known commonly as the Uganda savannah lizard and Boulenger's scrub lizard, is a species of lizard in the family Lacertidae ("wall lizards" or "true lizards"). The species is native to East Africa.

== Etymology ==
The specific name, boulengeri, is in honor of Belgian-born British herpetologist George Albert Boulenger.

== Geographic range ==
N. boulengeri is found in Kenya, Tanzania, Uganda, and Zambia.

== Habitat ==
The preferred natural habitats of N. boulengeri are shrubland, savanna, and forest.

== Description ==
N. boulengeri may attain a snout-to-vent length (SVL) of about 6.5 cm (2.6 in), with a tail about twice SVL.

== Reproduction ==
N. boulengeri is oviparous.
