= Nucras ornata =

Scientific classification
- Domain: Eukaryota
- Kingdom: Animalia
- Phylum: Chordata
- Class: Reptilia
- Order: Squamata
- Family: Lacertidae
- Genus: Nucras
- Species: N. ornata

Binomial name
- Nucras ornata (Gray, 1864)

Species of lizard

Nucras ornata, the ornate sandveld lizard or ornate scrub lizard, is a wall lizard in the family of true lizards (Lacertidae). It is found in Tanzania, Malawi, Zambia, south to KwaZulu-Natal, west to the Cape Province, Botswana, and Namibia.
