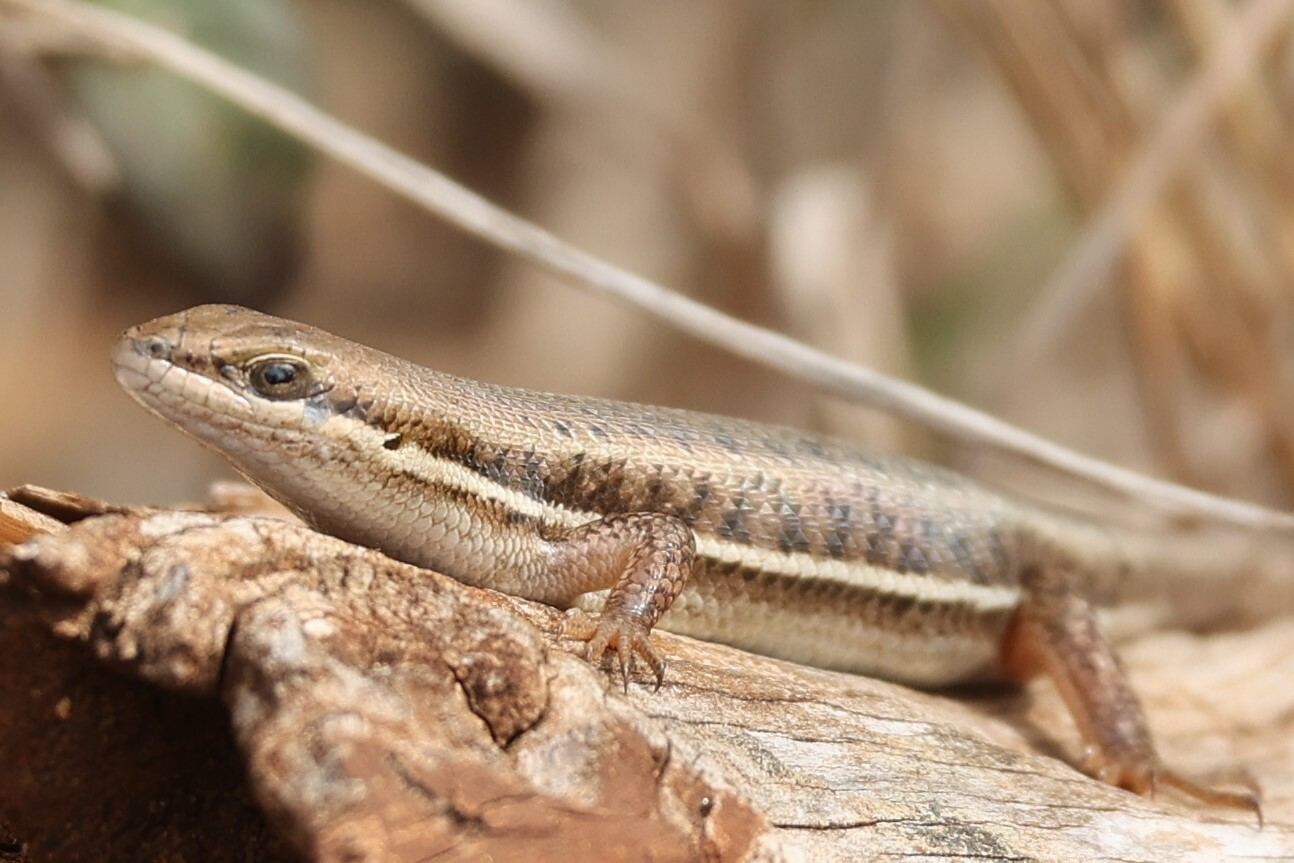

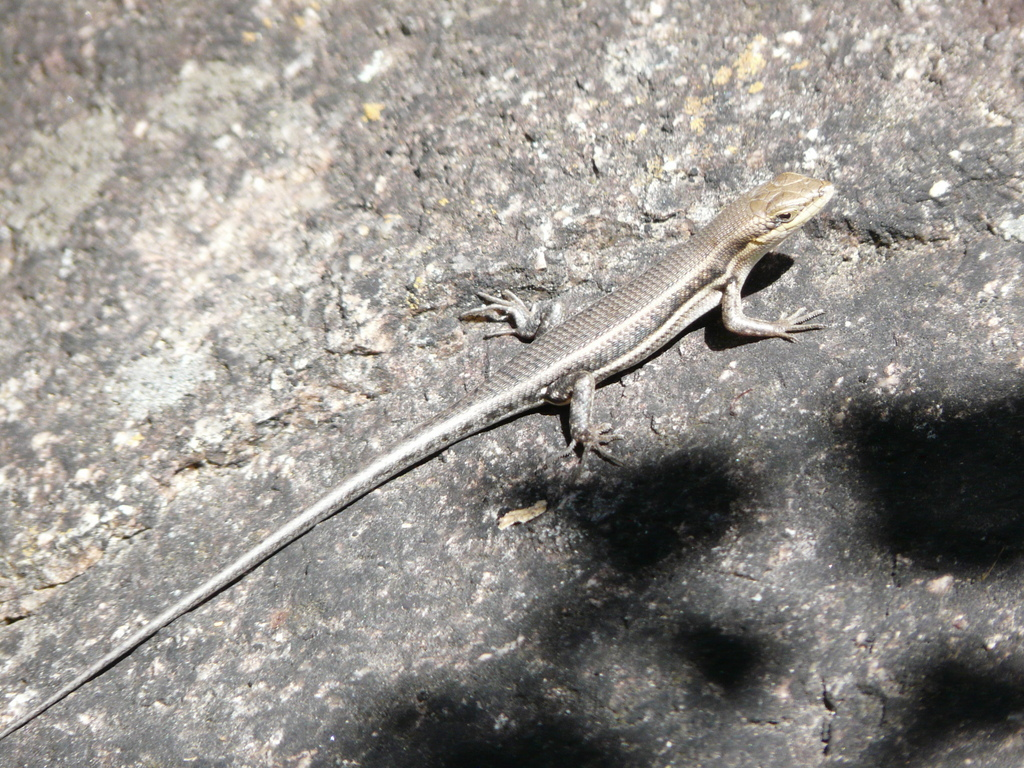

Scientific classification
- Domain: Eukaryota
- Kingdom: Animalia
- Phylum: Chordata
- Class: Reptilia
- Order: Squamata
- Family: Scincidae
- Genus: Trachylepis
- Species: T. varia

Binomial name
- Trachylepis varia (Peters, 1867)
- Extant (resident) Presence Uncertain

= Trachylepis varia =

Species of lizard

The eastern variable skink (Trachylepis varia) is a species of skink found in East Africa.
