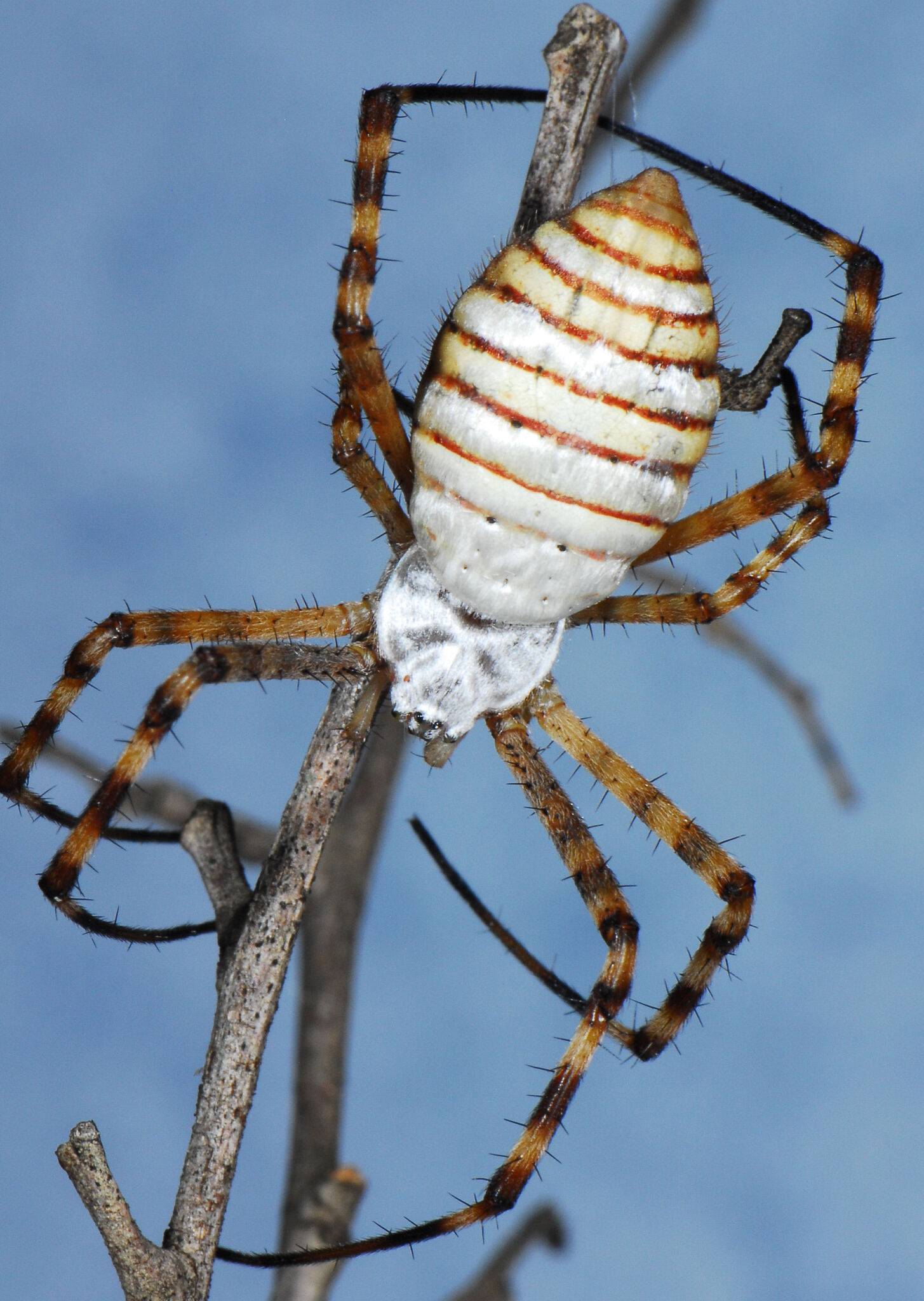
- Female

Conservation status
- Secure (NatureServe)

Scientific classification
- Kingdom: Animalia
- Phylum: Arthropoda
- Subphylum: Chelicerata
- Class: Arachnida
- Order: Araneae
- Infraorder: Araneomorphae
- Family: Araneidae
- Genus: Argiope
- Species: A. trifasciata

Binomial name
- Argiope trifasciata (Forskål, 1775)

Synonyms
- A. trifasciata synonyms: Aranea trifasciata Forsskål, 1775; Aranea fastuosa Olivier, 1789; Argiope aurelia Audouin, 1826; Epeira webbii Lucas, 1838; Epeira nephoda Walckenaer, 1841; Epeira latreilla Walckenaer, 1841; Epeira mauricia Walckenaer, 1841; Epeira fastuosa Walckenaer, 1841; Epeira argyraspides Walckenaer, 1841; Epeira fasciata Hentz, 1847; Epeira flavipes Nicolet, 1849; Argiope avara Thorell, 1859; Argiope plana L. Koch, 1867; Argyopes indecissa Holmberg, 1876; Argiope sticticalis O. Pickard-Cambridge, 1876; Argiope transversa Emerton, 1884; Argiope argyraspis McCook, 1894; Argiope simplex Badcock, 1932; Argiope abalosi Mello-Leitão, 1942; Argiope seminola Chamberlin & Ivie, 1944; Argiope stenogastra Mello-Leitão, 1945; Brachygea platycephala Caporiacco, 1947; Argiope pradhani Sinha, 1952

= Argiope trifasciata =

Banded garden orb-web spider

Species of spider

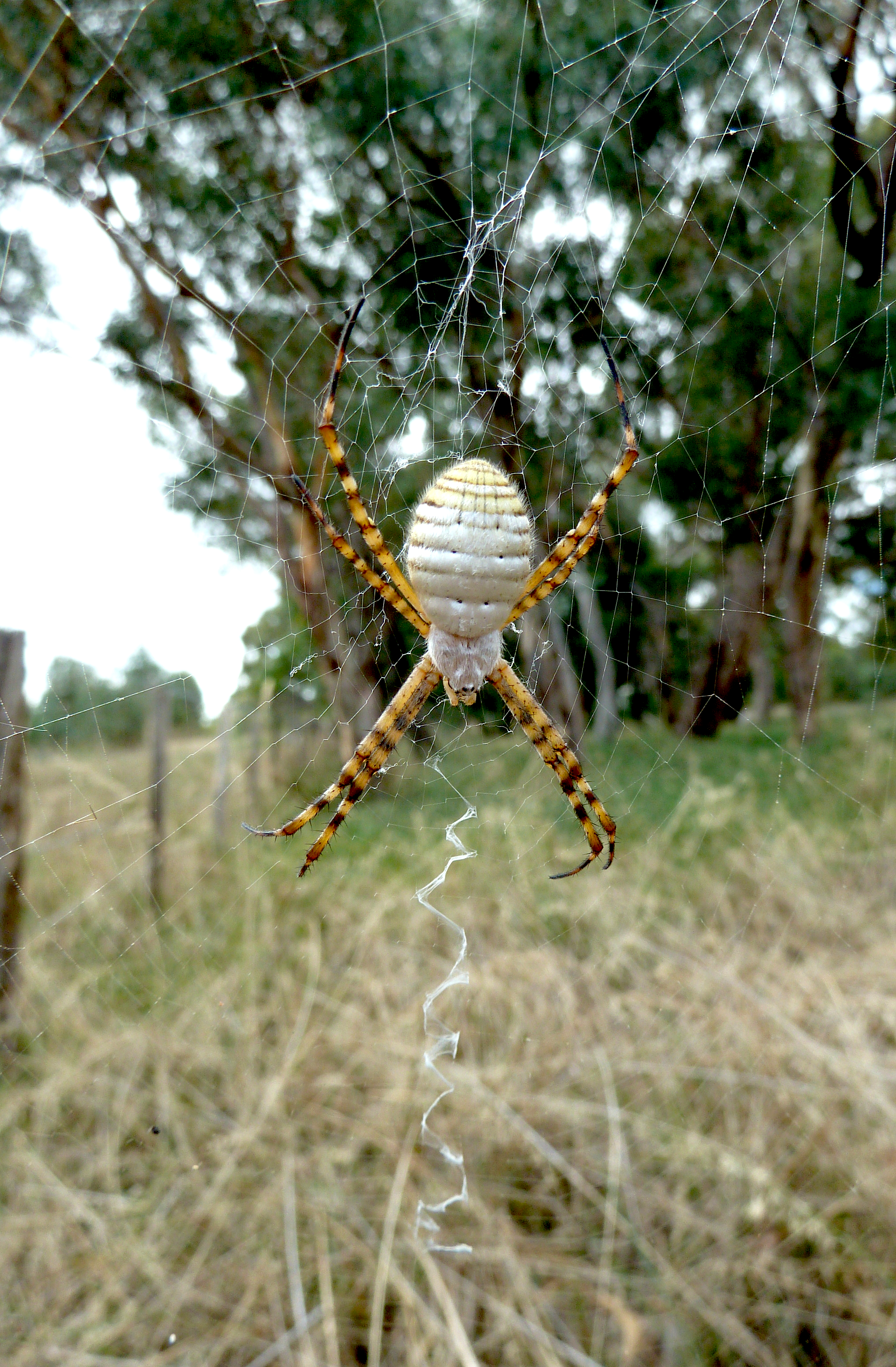
Adult female (Euroa/Victoria, Australia, © André Walter)

Argiope trifasciata (the banded garden spider or banded orb weaving spider) is a species of spider native to North and South America, but now found around the world.

They typically begin to appear during autumn from early September to late October as temperatures start dropping. In Egypt, the type locality of this spider, females were found surviving the relatively warm winter months.

Their webs can reach a diameter of about 60 cm. The length of the web depends on the size of the spider. Webs are capable of reaching a total length of two meters.

== Distribution ==
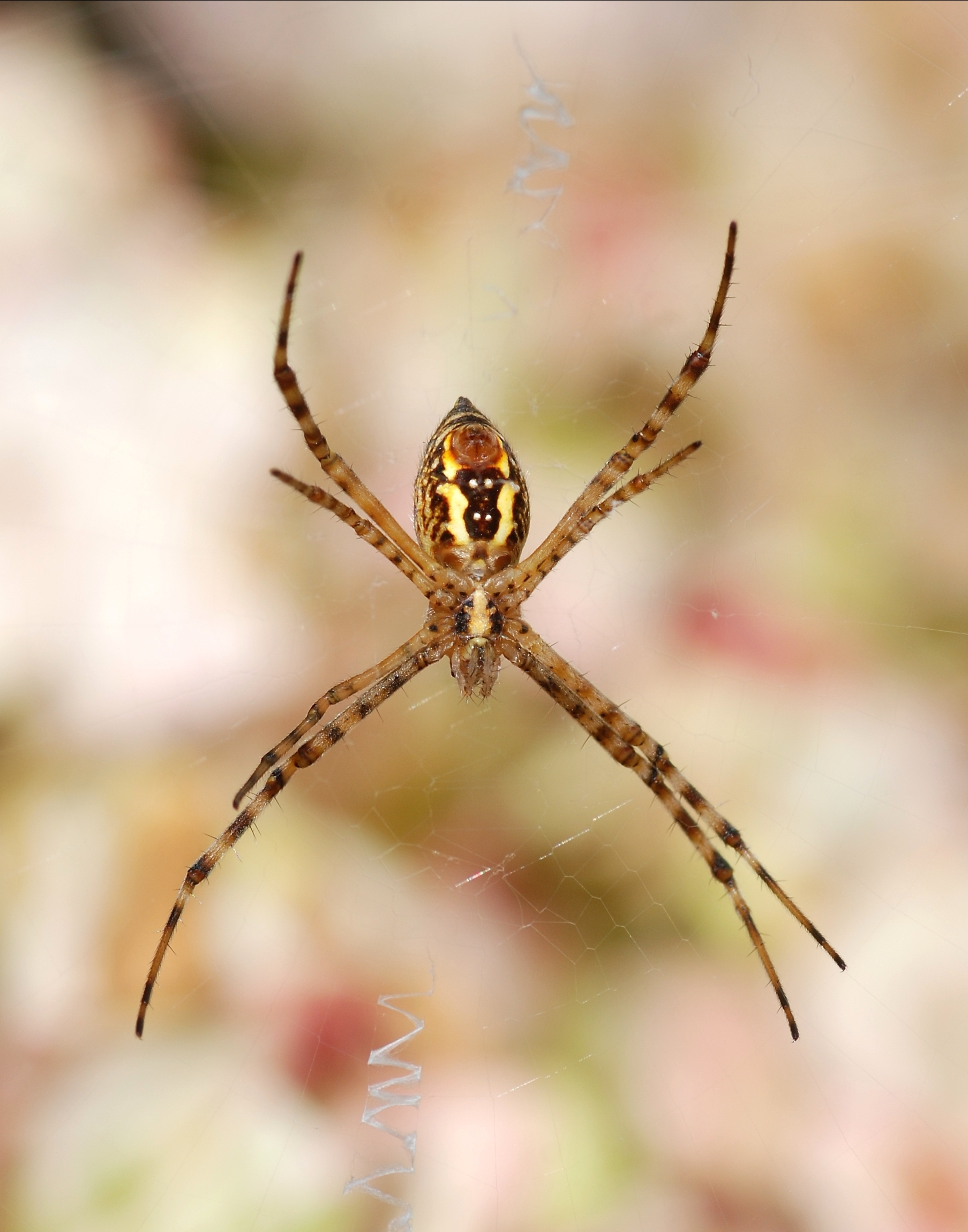
Ventral view of a female from Portugal

Originally from the Americas, Argiope trifasciata was introduced worldwide.

In Europe, it can be found on the Iberian Peninsula, the Canary Islands, and Madeira. The similar looking Argiope bruennichi is common in the Azores.

In Africa, the species is recorded from three countries. In South Africa, the species is known from eight of the nine provinces at elevations ranging from 3 to 1,557 m above sea level.

== Habitat and ecology ==
The species constructs orb webs in wetlands, open grassland areas and gardens. The webs are usually placed low in shrubby vegetation sturdy enough to bear their weight. The spider hangs at the hub head-down throughout the day.

In South Africa, the species inhabits all floral biomes except the Nama Karoo and Succulent Karoo biomes, and has also been collected from crops such as cotton, kenaf, lucerne and tomatoes.

== Behavior ==
The banded orb weaver wraps up a large milkweed bug and subsequently cuts it from its web

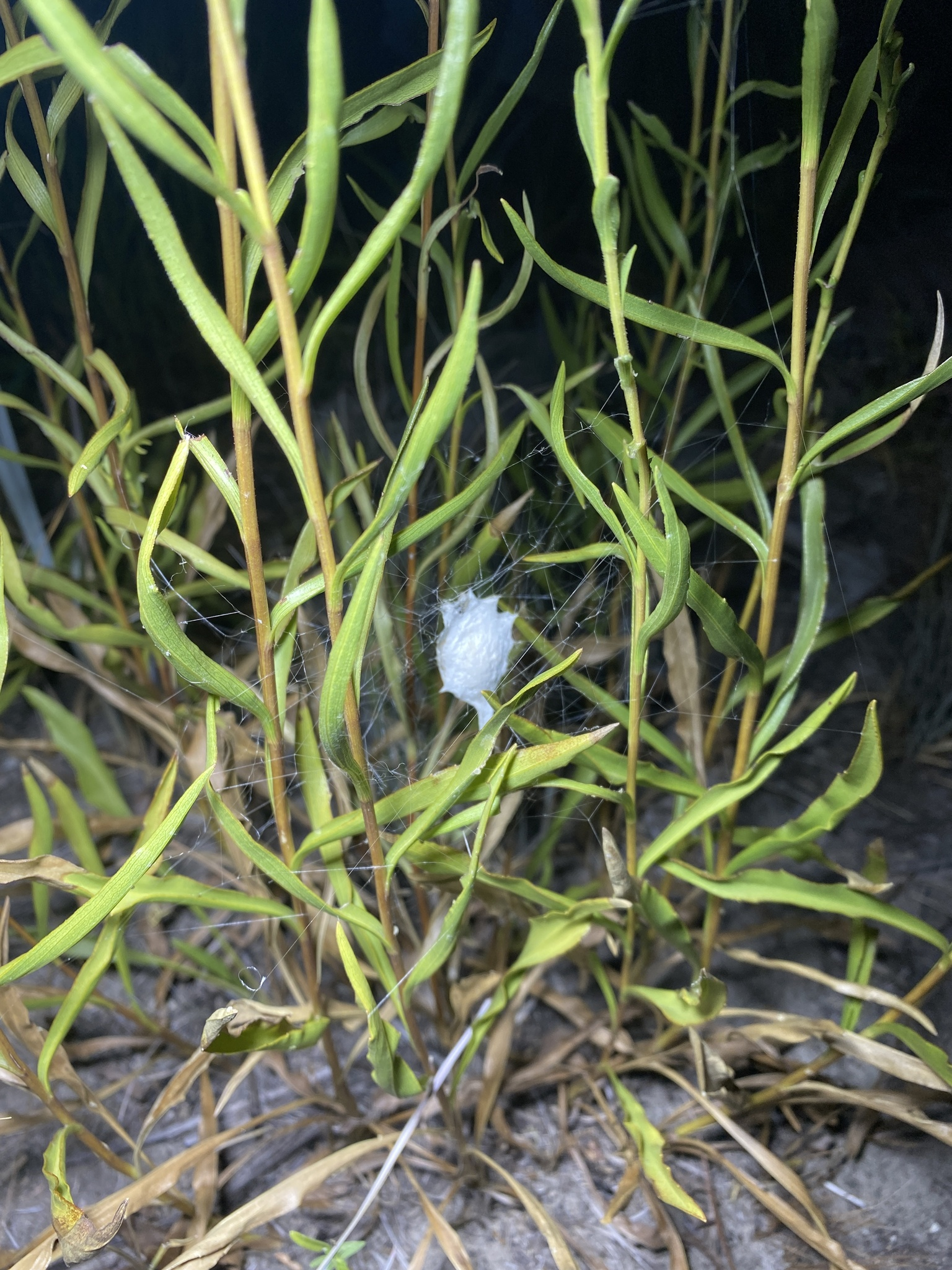
Egg sac, photographed in northern Texas

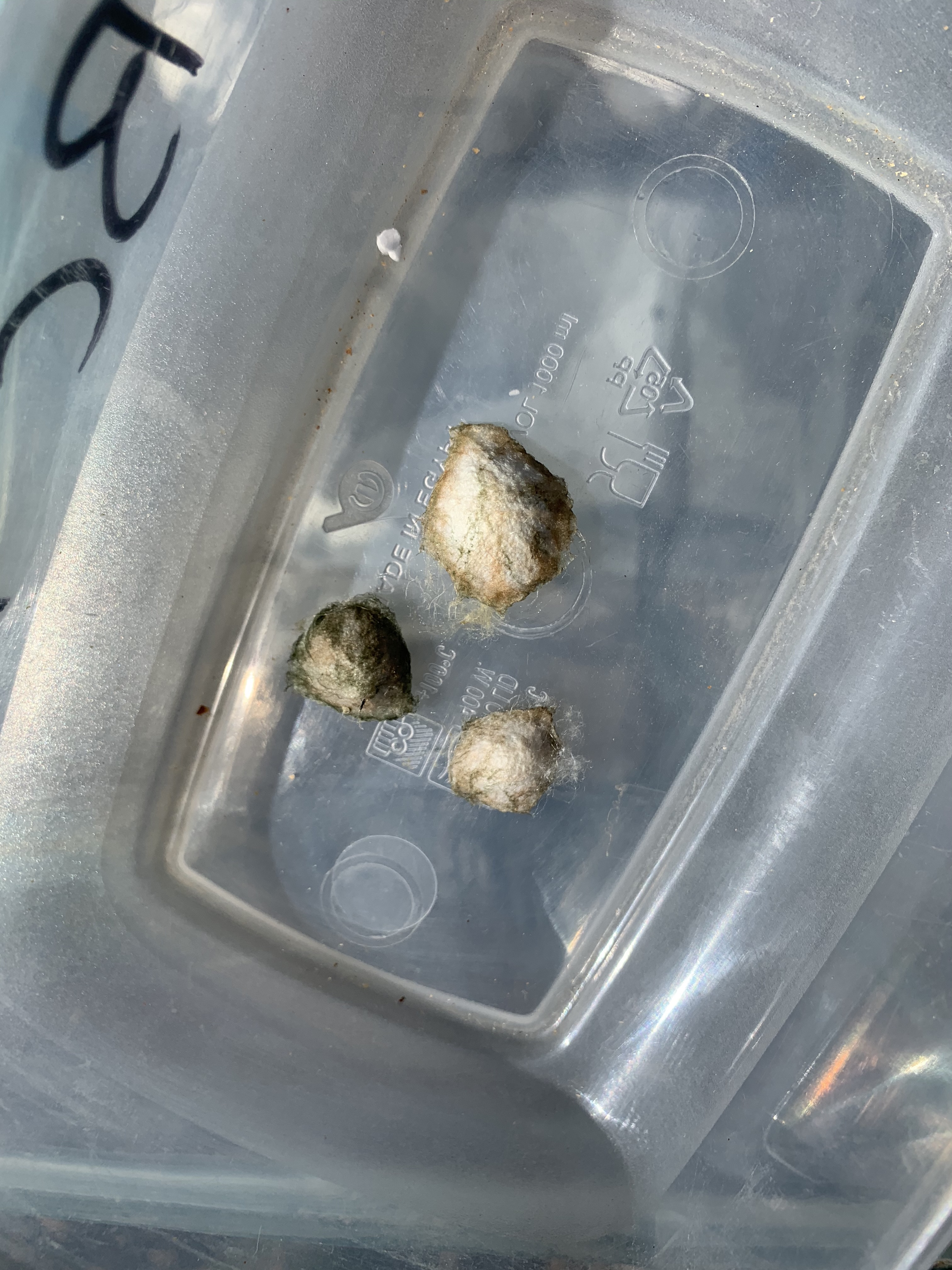
Egg Sacs (Cairo, Egypt)

In Illinois, Argiope trifasciata hatches in early summer but does not become readily notable until mid-August, when they have grown large enough to make their distinctive webs, which can be up to 60 cm (24 in) in diameter, among stems and bushes. The female rests at the centre of the web facing downwards, with her legs often arranged in pairs, making a cross shape; some female spiders conceal themselves in a hidden location close to the web, being alerted to a potential victim by a non-sticky thread leading to the center.

Some segments of the web often have thicker threads known as stabilimenta forming a decorative pattern. Male spiders are much smaller than females and have their own small webs in close proximity to the females' webs. Argiope trifasciata is diurnal, and feeds on the insects that get snared in the web. Large, powerful prey like paper wasps, are swiftly wrapped in silk to immobilise them, before being injected with toxic saliva.

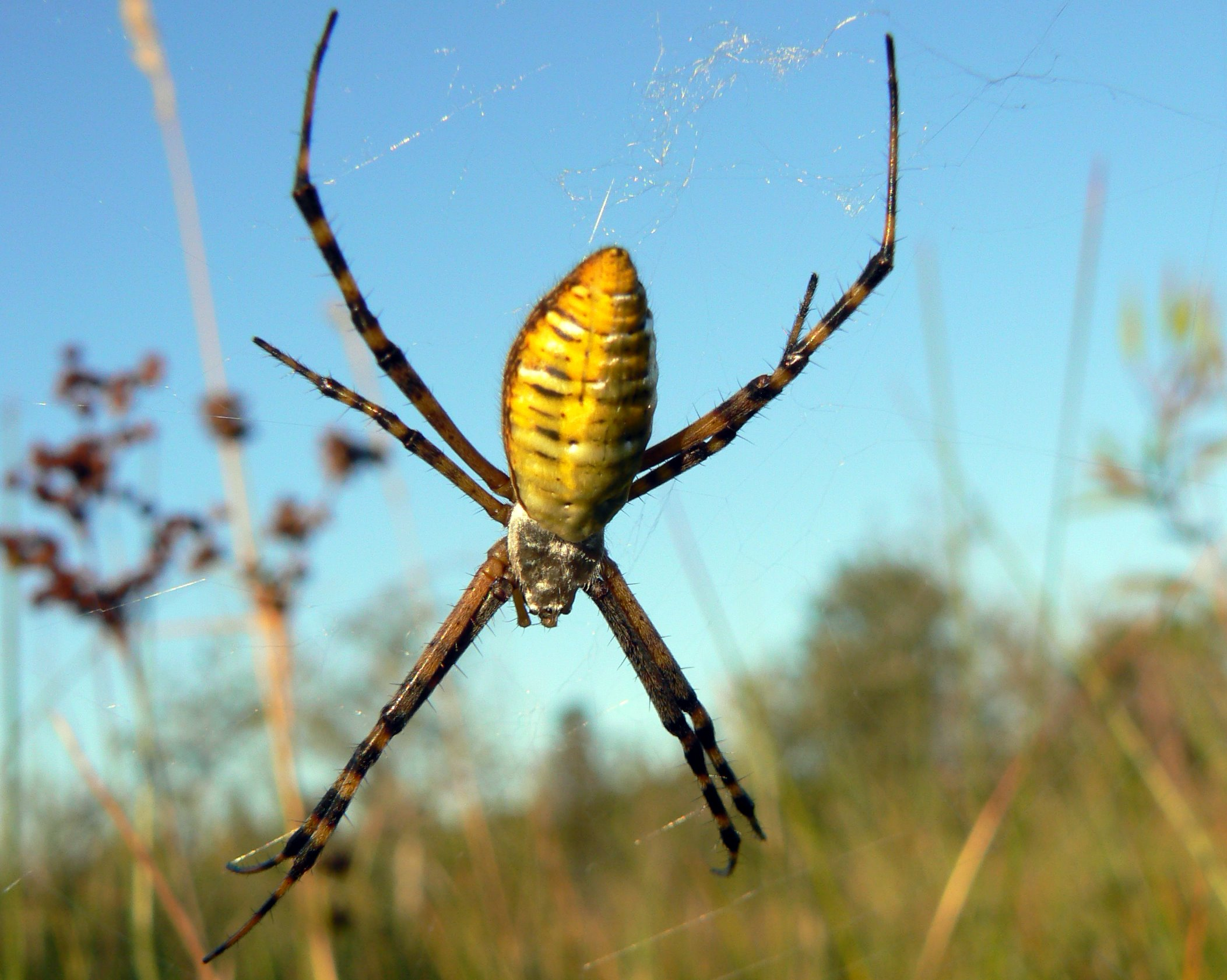
Female

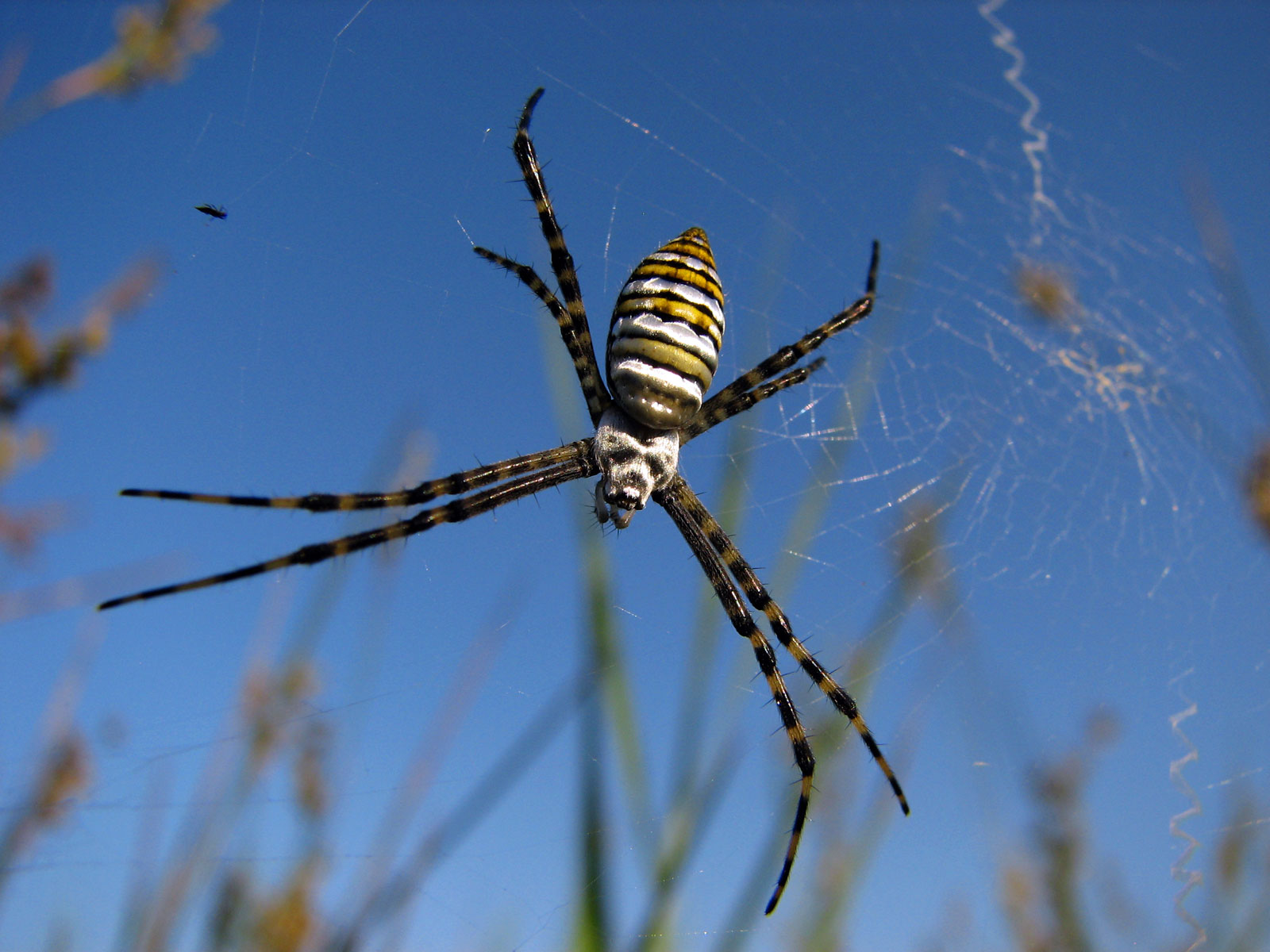
Female

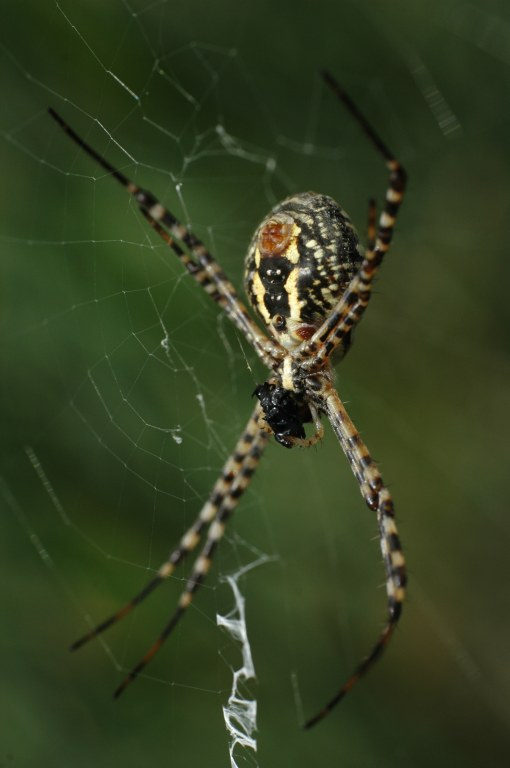
Female

== Web silk decorations ==
The silk decorations of Argiope spiders are thought of as visual signals by researchers. Even though the purpose behind the silk decorations made by Argiope trifasciata remains uncertain, there are a few hypotheses: to make the spider appear larger and to act as a warning sign.

It has been shown that webs containing stabilimenta catch fewer insects because they are less cryptic, but on the other hand these webs are less often damaged by birds flying through them.

== Conservation ==
Argiope trifasciata is listed as Least Concern by the South African National Biodiversity Institute due to its wide global distribution. The species is protected in 14 protected areas including Roodeplaatdam Nature Reserve, Ndumo Game Reserve, and Lekgalameetse Nature Reserve.

== Taxonomy ==
The species was originally described by Forsskål in 1775 as Aranea trifasciata. It was revised by Bjørn in 1997. Levi synonymized numerous species with A. trifasciata including A. abalosi, A. avara, A. seminola, A. stenogastra, A. pradhani and Brachygea platycephala.

== Subspecies ==
- Argiope trifasciata deserticola Simon, 1906 (Sudan)
- Argiope trifasciata kauaiensis Simon, 1900 (Hawaii)
