= Government of KwaZulu-Natal =

Provincial government of the South African province of KwaZulu-Natal

Government of KwaZulu-Natal uHulumeni waKwaZulu-Natali (Zulu)
- Provincial government
- Founding document: Constitution of South Africa
- Province: KwaZulu-Natal
- Country: South Africa

Executive branch
- King: Misuzulu kaZwelithini
- Premier: Thami Ntuli (IFP)
- Main Body: Executive Council of KwaZulu-Natal

Legislative branch
- Legislature: KwaZulu-Natal Legislature
- Speaker: Ntobeko Boyce (ANC)
- Deputy Speaker: Mmabatho Tembe (DA)
- Leader of the Official Opposition: Phathisizwe Chiliza (MKP)
- Meeting place: 234 Langalibalele Street, Pietermaritzburg

Judicial branch
- High Court Division: KwaZulu-Natal Division
- Judge President: Thoba Poyo-Dlwati
- Seat: 301 Church Street, Pietermaritzburg

The Government of KwaZulu-Natal (IsiZulu: uHulumeni waKwaZulu-Natal) is the subnational government of the South African province of KwaZulu-Natal (KZN). The politics of the province take place in the framework of a constitutional monarchy and liberal multi-party parliamentary democracy within a constitutional republic whereby the King of the Zulu Nation is the ceremonial figurehead of an elected government. The provincial government comprises the second sphere of government of South Africa and consists of three branches with checks and balances between them as follows:

- Executive: Premier of KwaZulu-Natal who appoints and chairs the Executive Council of KwaZulu-Natal
- Legislature: The unicameral KwaZulu-Natal Provincial Legislature elected by proportional representation which elects the Premier
- Judiciary: KwaZulu-Natal Division of the High Court of South Africa appointed by the President of South Africa on the advice of the Judicial Service Commission

KwaZulu-Natal traces its history to the Zulu Kingdom. The Zulu Kingdom was under the suzerainty of the Mthethwa Empire in the early 19th-century. Under King Shaka, the Mthethwa Empire was subsumed into the Zulu Kingdom in 1817. Following the Battle of Blood River, the Zulu Kingdom ceded territory to the Voortrekkers who formed the Natalia Republic therefrom in 1839. The Natalia Republic was conquered by the United Kingdom of Great Britain and Ireland in 1843 and incorporated into the British Empire as the Natal Colony. The New Republic was formed from territory ceded by the Zulu Kingdom under King Dinuzulu to the Boers in 1884. The Zulu Kingdom became a British protectorate in 1887. The New Republic was annexed by the South African Republic in 1888. The Zulu Kingdom was annexed by the Natal Colony in 1897.

The Natal Colony became part of the Union of South Africa in 1910 as the Natal Province. The Zulu Territorial Authority was formed in 1970 from which the KwaZulu homeland was formed in 1977. The land of the KwaZulu homeland was vested in the Ingonyama Trust of which the Zulu King was the trustee in 1994. KwaZulu and the Natal Province were combined to form the KwaZulu-Natal province shortly afterwards and its government was finalised with the passing of the Constitution of South Africa in 1996. Although recognised as a paramount traditional leader of the Zulu people with a statutory relationship with the Natal and then KZN government since the Amakhosi and Iziphakanyiswa Act of 1990, the Zulu King was formally recognised as the monarch of the reunited province in 2005 with the passing of the KwaZulu-Natal Traditional Leadership and Governance Act.

== Political history ==
=== Pre-colonial era ===
The Zulu Kingdom under His Majesty, King Shaka, with Port Natal (future Durban), the locus of the then-to-be-established Natalia Republic shown to the south, as well as the migrations from the Mfecane

The historical territory of the Zulu Kingdom as at 1811 comprises the modern-day territory of the KwaZulu-Natal province (KZN) and some of the institutions that characterised its government, namely its aristocracy and monarchy despite their weakening and changes during the period of European colonisation continue to exist as traditional leaders within the province.

The Zulu Kingdom was a small polity in the northern part of the territory that comprises modern-day KZN, that coexisted with other polities such as Khumalo, Ndwandwe etc., broadly known as the Nguni people. It came under the Mthethwa Empire when the lieutenant of King Dingiswayo and eldest son of King Senzangakhona kaJama, Shaka kaSenzangakhona assumed the throne of the Zulu Kingdom following his father's death. When King Dingiswayo was killed in 1817 following a battle with the Ndwandwe Kingdom under King Zwide kaLanga. King Shaka kaSenzangakhona succeeded King Dingiswayo and subsumed the Mthethwa Empire into the Zulu Kingdom, integrating the Nguni nations in the area of modern-day KZN which became the modern Zulu people.

During a period known as the Mfecane, King Shaka kaSenzangakhona and his successors conquered and annexed other kingdoms such as the Ndwandwe during the Ndwandwe-Zulu War. King Shaka kaSenzangakhona was assassinated by his younger half-brother King Dingane kaSenzangakhona in 1828. King Dingane kaSenzangakhona and his successors King Mpande kaSenzangakhona and King Cetshwayo kaMpande confronted the arrival of European colonists, namely those descending from those arriving with Jan van Riebeeck in the Cape region under the Dutch East India Company in 1619. With the Napoleonic Wars and subsequent French conquest of the Netherlands spread to the rest of South Africa's modern-day territory including in the area of the Zulu Kingdom.

This migration, known as the Great Trek, whose participants associated together as the Boers, confronted the Zulu. Following their loss to the Boers at the Battle of Blood River, the Zulu ceded a portion of their territory that became the Natalia Republic with its capital Pietermaritzburg being built in the area of the Zulu capital under King Dingane at uMngungundlovu which relocated to Ulundi. In the Scramble for Africa, the United Kingdom of Great Britain and Ireland (UK) invaded the Natalia Republic following the Xhosa Wars with the isiXhosa-speaking people to the south in the modern-day Eastern Cape. They turned the Natal Republic into the Natal Colony and kept their administration based at its capital, the old Zulu capital city.

=== Colonial era ===
Colony of Natal in red bordering the Boer republics of the South African Republic and the Orange Free State with the Zulu Kingdom then Zulu Protectorate absorbed

Following the Anglo-Zulu War, the Zulu dynasty was deposed and King Cetshwayo fled leaving his faction, the Usuthu behind (who continue to act as a traditional authority in the Nongoma area of modern-day South Africa). The British partitioned the Zulu Kingdom among various aristocrats and vassal rulers. Due to a Civil War between the Mandlakazi under Zibhebhu kaMaphitha and the Usuthu, the British attempted to restore King Cetshwayo who returned to Ulundi. King Cetshwayo returned to Zululand and was the last king of an independent Zulu Kingdom which became a British protectorate in 1887. With the aid of Afrikaner mercenaries (known as Dinuzulu's Volunteers), King Cetshwayo's son, King Dinuzulu kaCetshwayo reunited the Zulu Kingdom in 1884. He ceded some Zulu territory to Afrikaners which was known as the Nieuwe Republiek. This country was annexed by the South African Republic in 1887.

The British government direct Sir Theophilus Shepstone, governor of the Natal Colony to annex the Zulu Kingdom, ending its protectorate status in 1897. While British subjects, the newly incorporated Zulu people did not acquire citizenship or equal rights and continued to be ruled through aristocrats subservient to the British and pushed to ethnic reservations. Two years later the Second Anglo-Boer War began. At its end in 1902 with the Peace of Vereeniging that resulted in the Natal Colony being absorbed into the Union of South Africa in 1910 with the passage of the South Africa Act by the Parliament of the United Kingdom.

The Natal Colony became the Natal Province with Zulu people being further marginalised into ethnic reservations starting with the passage of the Natives Land Act of 1913, a policy opposed by King Solomon kaDinuzulu who founded the Inkatha yamaZulu in 1920 to resist the dispossession of Zulu land by the Union government.

=== Apartheid era ===
In dark red, the Natal Province and in light red, the KwaZulu homeland

This movement succeeded by the Inkatha National Cultural Liberation Movement (simply Inkatha), founded and led by former member of the African National Congress Youth League (ANCYL), Prince Mangosuthu Buthelezi that favoured non-violent resistance to the policy of apartheid under the National Party. Relations between the Inkatha and African National Congress (ANC) were close but deteriorated leading to violent altercations between the two.

When the KwaZulu homeland was formally established in 1977, it was government as a one-party semi-autonomous state under the Inkatha. Its capital was moved from Nongoma, the seat of the Zulu King at the time, to Ulundi in 1980. Inkatha was both perceived as an ethnonationalist puppet regime of the apartheid government and an anti-apartheid resistance movement and it disagreed with the ANC on economic sanctions and the armed struggle. Inkatha militia were trained by the South African Defence Force and subsequently the Afrikaner Weerstandsbeweging, who pertrated violence such as the Boipatong massacre in 1992.

In the negotiations to end apartheid, the Inkatha refused to participate unless the Zulu monarch, then King Goodwill Zwelithini kaBhekuzulu was made a sovereign monarch. To that end, the KwaZulu government passed the Amakhosi and Iziphakanyiswa Act in 1990 recognising the Zulu King, the chief of the Usuthu tribe, as the King of the Zulus. The KwaZulu government passed the Ingonyama Trust Act in 1994 to place all the land of the homeland under the trusteeship of the Zulu King via the Ingonyama Trust. Despite initially pulling out from the 1994 South African general election, they agreed to participate.

=== Post-apartheid era ===
In dark red, KwaZulu-Natal broadly in the shape prescribed by the Interim Constitution in 1994 following the 12th amendment to the Constitution of South Africa which incorporated the former Eastern Cape enclave of Umzimkulu

With the commencement of the Interim Constitution on the same day, 27 April 2024, KwaZulu homeland and Natal Province were dissolved and replaced by the KwaZulu-Natal province. Zulu people living in the former KwaZulu homeland who were disenfranchised, were allowed to vote and received full South African citizenship. Inkatha rebranded as the Inkatha Freedom Party (IFP), joined the Government of National Unity with Prince Mangosuthu as Minister of Home Affairs and won a majority of the votes in KZN from the first democratic elections with Frank Mdlalose (former KwaZulu Minister of the Interior) being elected as the first Premier. He resigned in 1997 following his appointment as ambassador to Egypt. After nearly two years of Ben Ngubane as the Acting Premier, he was succeeded by Lionel Mtshali in 1999 following the 1999 South African general election.

Following the 2004 South African general election, S'bu Ndebele was elected Premier and the ANC became the governing party of KZN by winning a plurality of votes and the IFP became the official opposition. Following the 2009 South African general election, the ANC won its first outright majority and a landslide victory of over 62% in KZN when KZN native, Jacob Zuma became the President of South Africa. Sbu Ndebele was replaced as Premier by Zweli Mkhize. After Zweli Mkhize was elected Treasurer-General of the ANC in 2013, Senzo Mchunu was elected the Premier. He was defeated by Sihle Zikalala in 2016 for election as the KZN ANC Provincial Chairperson, resulting in his resignation as Premier. Willies Mchunu succeeded Senzo Mchunu. After the 2019 South African general election, Sihle Zikalala was elected as the Premier with the ANC declining in votes but retaining its majority.

In 2021, following (but not exclusively causally related to) the arrest of Jacob Zuma, the July riots erupted across the province leading to vandalism and looting of shops which spread to Gauteng. He resigned as Premier in 2022 and was replaced by the first female premier of KZN, Nomusa Dube-Ncube. The ANC was relegated to third place after the 2024 South African general election by the uMkhonto weSizwe Party (which won a 40% plurality in KZN under Jacob Zuma), the Inkatha Freedom Party negotiated a coalition with the ANC and Democratic Alliance (DA) as part of a broader grand coalition called the Government of National Unity that saw it returning to the premiership with the election of Thami Ntuli.

In December 2025, premier Thami Ntuli, narrowly survived with 39 votes to 40 a MK-sponsored motion of no confidence vote in the KwaZulu-Natal legislature.

== Monarchy ==
The King of the Zulu Nation (IsiZulu: Ingonyama yamaZulu and Isilo Samabandla or simply Ingonyama and Isilo) is the ceremonial figurehead of the province and the paramount leader of the Zulu people and head of the Zulu royal family. The reigning monarch is His Majesty, King Misuzulu kaZwelithini, who succeeded the late King Goodwill Zwelithini in 2022. His main official residence is the Kwakhangelamakengane Royal Palace in Nongoma.

The King receives a stipend from the KwaZulu-Natal provincial government and relations with the monarchy are administered through the Royal Trust and Household Agency within the Office of the Premier. The King is responsible for promoting and protecting Zulu cultural heritage and promoting the interests of the province of KwaZulu Natal. He performs ceremonial functions such as awarding honours on the advice of the government, delivering a speech at the start of each session of the Provincial Legislature, meeting the Executive Council and holding audiences with the Premier. He is the head of the Zulu traditional militia (amabutho).

As the trustee of the Ingonyama Trust, he oversees a third of the land of the province and has a significant influence over the lives of the province's rural residents. He oversees the Zulu traditional leadership. The Prime Minister to the King (IsiZulu: Undunankulu, not the Premier of the Province) is appointed by the King to oversee administration within the Royal Court and is currently Member of the Executive Council for Cooperative Governance and Traditional Affairs, Thulasizwe Buthelezi, who succeeded the late Prince Mangosuthu Buthelezi in 2023.

His first spouse and Chief Queen Consort of the Zulu Nation (IsiZulu: Undlunkulu, Indlovukazi yamaZulu) is Her Majesty, Queen Ntokozo KaMayisela. Succession to the throne is by appointment limited to agnates of the Zulu dynasty, of whom the heir presumptive is the Crown Prince, His Royal Highness, Prince Jubezizweni, with reigning monarch being appointed by the late Queen Regent, Mantfombi Dlamini and recognised by President Cyril Ramaphosa in terms of Zulu customary law and the law of South Africa. The KZN Council of Traditional and Khoi-San Leader based in Ulundi, of which the King is an ex officio member, consists of traditional leaders and represents traditional communities.

== Legislature ==
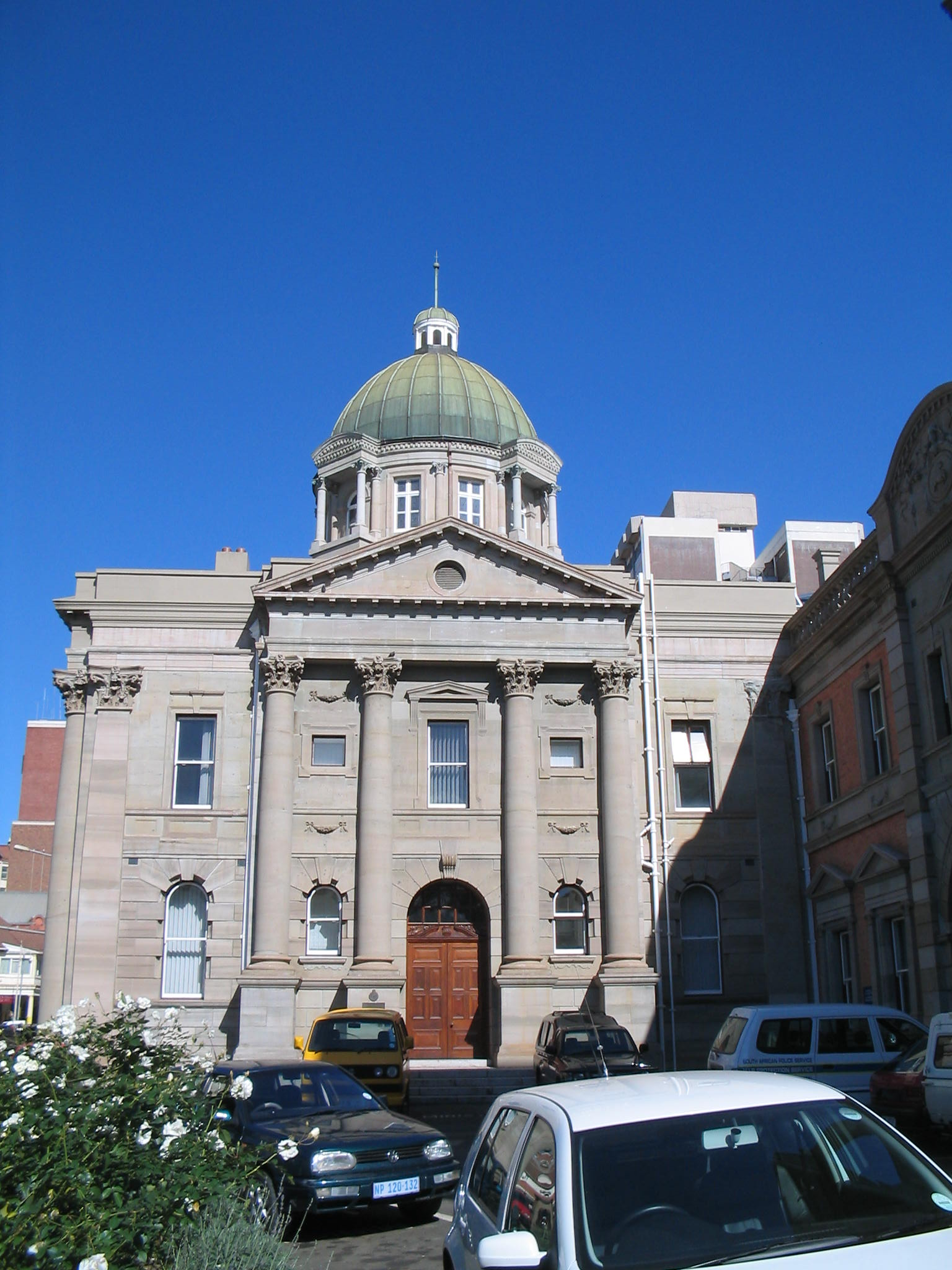
KwaZulu-Natal Provincial Legislature at 236 Langalibalele Street, Pietermaritzburg

The KwaZulu-Natal Provincial Legislature (IsiZulu: IsiShayamthetho saKwaZulu-Natali) is the legislative branch of the provincial government of KZN. It is elected by closed-list party proportional representation every five years unless either a majority of the members vote to an early dissolution at earliest 3 years before the last election or a vacancy arises in the premiership in the legislature is unable to elect a Premier in within 30 days.

The Provincial Legislature has exclusive jurisdiction to pass laws over matters listed in Schedule 5 of the constitution such as liquor licensing and has joint jurisdiction with the Parliament of South Africa over matters in Schedule 4 such as healthcare, basic education and agriculture. It elects 10 delegates to the National Council of Provinces based on the proportion of parties represented. It elects the Premier, whom it can remove with a vote of no confidence.

The KZN Provincial Legislature is seated in Pietermaritzburg, the former capital of the Zulu Kingdom under King Dingane (then known as uMngungundlovu), Natal Colony and Natal Province. The Inkatha Freedom Party has campaigned unsuccessfully for the legislature to sit in the capital of the Zulu monarchy and former capital of the KwaZulu homeland, Ulundi. Annual session of the legislature are opened by a speech from the King and the state of the province addressed by the Premier. Its presiding officer is the Speaker (IsiZulu: uSomlomo), currently Ntobeko Boyce of the African National Congress (ANC) since 2019 who is deputised by Mmabatho Tembe of the Democratic Alliance (DA) since 2024. The Leader of the Opposition is Phathisizwe Chiliza of the uMkhonto weSizwe Party (MKP) since 2024.

== Executive ==
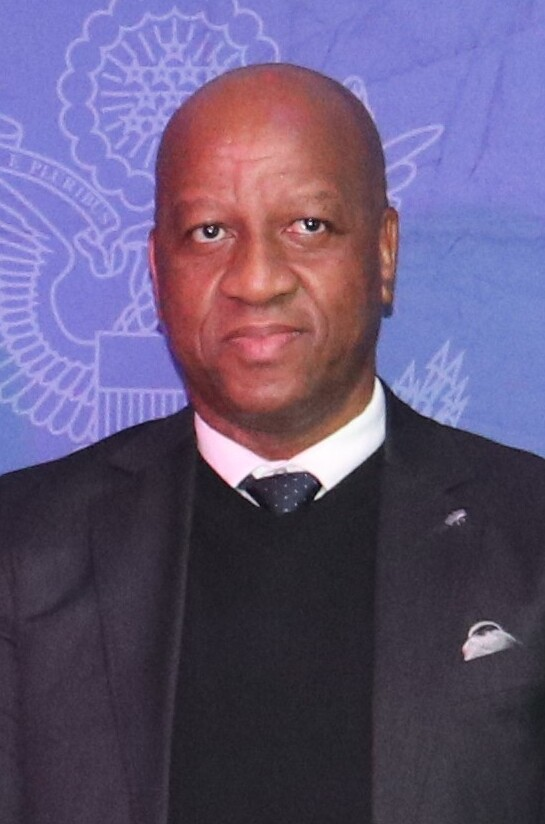
His Excellency, the Premier of KwaZulu-Natal, Thami Ntuli of the Inkatha Freedom Party

The Premier of KwaZulu-Natal, currently Thami Ntuli of the Inkatha Freedom Party (IFP), is the head of the provincial government. He appoints the Members (MECs or in IsiZulu: uNgqonqgoshe wesiFundazwe; lit: "Provincial Minister") of the Executive Council of KwaZulu-Natal whose members oversee provincial executive departments. The Executive Council comprises the highest decision-making body of the provincial government and is chaired by the Premier. Despite not participating in its day-to-day affairs and lacking a role in its appointment, it is customary for the Executive Council to meet with the King after it is constituted and for the Premier to have regular audiences with the Zulu King.

KwaZulu-Natal Executive Council 2024
Post	Member	Term		Party
Premier of KwaZulu-Natal	Thami Ntuli	2024	Incumbent	IFP
MEC for Finance	Francois Rodgers	2024	Incumbent	DA
MEC for Health	Nomagugu Simelane-Zulu	2024	Incumbent	ANC
MEC for Education	Sipho Hlomuka	2024	Incumbent	ANC
MEC for Economic Development, Tourism and Environmental Affairs	Musa Zondi	2024	Incumbent	IFP
MEC for Agriculture and Rural Development	Thembeni kaMadlopha-Mthethwa	2024	Incumbent	IFP
MEC for Transport and Human Settlements	Siboniso Duma	2024	Incumbent	ANC
MEC for Social Development	Mbali Shinga	2024	Incumbent	NFP
MEC for Cooperative Governance and Traditional Affairs	Thulasizwe Buthelezi	2024	Incumbent	IFP
MEC for Public Works and Infrastructure	Martin Meyer	2024	Incumbent	DA
MEC for Sports, Arts and Culture	Mntomuhle Khawula	2024	Incumbent	IFP

== Judiciary ==
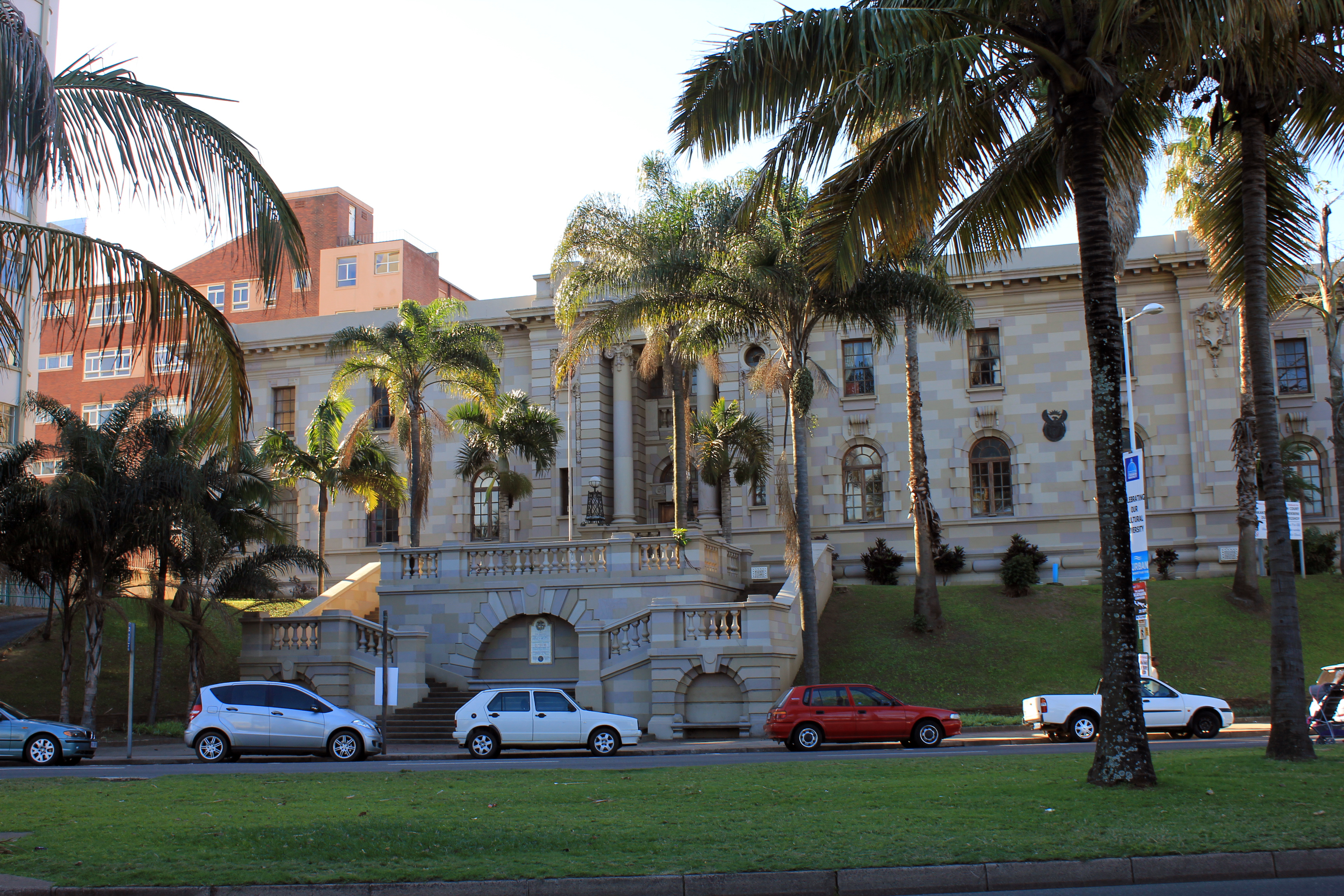
Durban seat of the KwaZulu-Natal Division of the High Court of South Africa

KZN does not have a separate judiciary from the rest of the judiciary of South Africa. The KwaZulu-Natal Division of the High Court of South Africa is headed by the Judge President and is appointed by the President of South Africa on the advice of the Judicial Service Commission which interviews and nominates candidates. The incumbent Judge President is Thoba Poyo-Dlwati who was appointed by President Cyril Ramaphosa. The court's seat in Pietermaritzburg has jurisdiction over the whole province and is descended from the Natal Provincial Division of the Supreme Court of South Africa (which descended from the Supreme Court of Natal). It has a seat in Durban which has jurisdiction over the city and its surrounding areas. It receives appeals from Magistrate's Courts within the provincial boundaries.

== Administrative divisions ==
KwaZulu-Natal consists of 1 metropolitan municipality (which is the third most populated metropolitan area in the country) and 10 district municipalities which consists of 44 local municipalities as follows:

- eThekwini Metropolitan Municipality (Durban)
- Amajuba District (Newcastle)
  - Newcastle
  - Dannhauser
  - eMadlangeni
- Uthukela District (Ladysmith)
  - Emnambithi/Ladysmith
  - Indaka
  - Umtshezi
  - Okhahlamba
  - Imbabazane
- Zululand District (Ulundi)
  - Ulundi
  - Nongoma
  - Abaqulusi
  - uPhongolo
  - eDumbe
- uMkhanyakude District (Mkuze)
  - Jozini
  - Hlabisa
  - Umhlabuyalingana
  - Mtubatuba
  - The Big 5 False Bay
- King Cetshwayo District (Richards Bay) [formerly uThungulu]
  - uMhlathuze
  - Umlalazi
  - Nkandla
  - Mbonambi
  - Ntambanana
  - Mthonjaneni
- uMzinyathi District (Dundee)
  - Msinga
  - Nqutu
  - Umvoti
  - Endumeni
- uMgungundlovu District (Pietermaritzburg)
  - Msunduzi
  - uMshwathi
  - uMngeni
  - Richmond
  - Mkhambathini
  - Mpofana
  - Impendle
- iLembe District (kwaDukuza)
  - KwaDukuza
  - Ndwedwe
  - Mandeni
  - Maphumulo
- Ugu District (Port Shepstone)
  - Ray Nkonyeni
  - uMdoni
  - uMuziwabantu
  - Umzumbe
- Harry Gwala District (Ixopo)
  - Dr Nkosazana Dlamini-Zuma
  - Johannes Phumani Phungula (formerly Ubuhlebezwe)
  - Greater Kokstad
  - Umzimkhulu

== See also ==
- KwaZulu-Natal
