= King of the Zulu Nation =

Office of the King of the Zulu Nation

- Isilo Samabandla Onke; Ingonyama yamaZulu
- Provincial

Incumbent
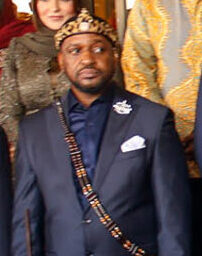
- Misuzulu Sinqobile since 7 May 2021

Details
- Style: English: His Majesty; IsiZulu: Ndabezitha
- Heir presumptive: Prince Mandulo KaMisuzulu
- First monarch: Mnguni I (namesake of the Nguni people of which the Zulu nation is a part); Zulu I ka Malandela (namesake of the Zulu nation)
- Residences: KwaKhangelamankengane Royal Palace; KwaKhethomthandayo Royal Palace; KwaLinduzulu Royal Palace; KwaDlamahlahla Royal Palace; oSuthu Royal Palace; eNyokeni Royal Palace; eMachobeni Royal Palace; eMashobeni Royal Palace; KwaNkomonye Royal Palace
- Website: zulumonarch.org

The King of the Zulu Nation (IsiZulu: Isilo Samabandla Onke or Ingonyama yamaZulu) or simply the Zulu King, is the paramount subnational traditional leader of the amaZulu ethnolinguistic group, the Monarch of the KwaZulu-Natal province of South Africa (i.e., the ceremonial figurehead of the Government of KwaZulu-Natal) and the Lord of the Usuthu. The Zulu Kings trace their lineage to Mnguni. Having been a minor but independent polity, they fell under the suzerainty of the Mthethwa when Shaka Zulu ascended to the throne with the support of his suzerain, King Dingiswayo.

During the Mfecane, the Zulu Kingdom expanded significantly until the cession of territory by King Dingane to the Natalia Republic following the Battle of Blood River. Zulu territory was annexed into the Natal Colony and the South African Republic following the Anglo-Zulu War during the reign of King Cetshwayo. Following which, the Zulu Kingdom had a civil war whereby the Mandlakazi under Zibhebhu rebelled against the Usuthu faction of the monarch, during the reign of King Dinuzulu which was eventually reincorporated with the aid of Dinuzulu's Volunteers. With the formation of the KwaZulu homeland, King Goodwill Zwelithini became a non-sovereign constitutional monarch of the Zulu. Following the end of apartheid in 1994, KwaZulu was reincorporated into South Africa and the King was recognised as a traditional leader. The reigning King is Misuzulu Sinqobile who ascended in 2021.

Although South Africa is a constitutional republic, the Zulu ethnolinguistic group is afforded formal representation, inter alia, through the King's participation in the National House of Traditional Leaders, who continues to act as the highest ceremonial and religious leader of the Zulu nation whose duties include hosting the Umkhosi Wokweshwama and Umhlanga Reed Dance. He is paid a salary and the Zulu royal family receives a grant from the state. He is the trustee of the Ingonyama Trust which administers rural land formerly part of the KwaZulu homeland. The Zulu monarchy maintains relations with other monarchies such as Eswatini through dynastic marriages.

The official seat of the monarchy is in Nongoma and his main seat is Kwakhangelamankengane Royal Palace among others. Formally known as Isilo Samabandla Onke and Ingonyama YamaZulu in the Zulu language, he is addressed as His Majesty in official English sources. Although formal recognition by the President of South Africa is required for the King to enjoy his emoluments and assume his powers, accession is by a form of agnatic primogeniture which gives preference to the sons of the Indlunkulu (great wife) in which he has some discretion to choose his successor. The King's coronation incorporates Zulu religious elements such as the royal hunting of a lion, entering of the kraal enrobed with the lion's pelt and cleansing of the throne, which binds the Zulu regiments to the King, Christian elements such as the anointing and secular elements such as the presentation of a certificate by the President. The King exercises other official duties such as reading a speech at the opening of the KwaZulu-Natal Legislature, and receiving the Executive Council of KwaZulu-Natal.

== History ==
The Zulu monarchy traces its founding to Mnguni, who was succeeded by several other monarchs however the namesake of the Zulu people is Zulu I ka Malandela.

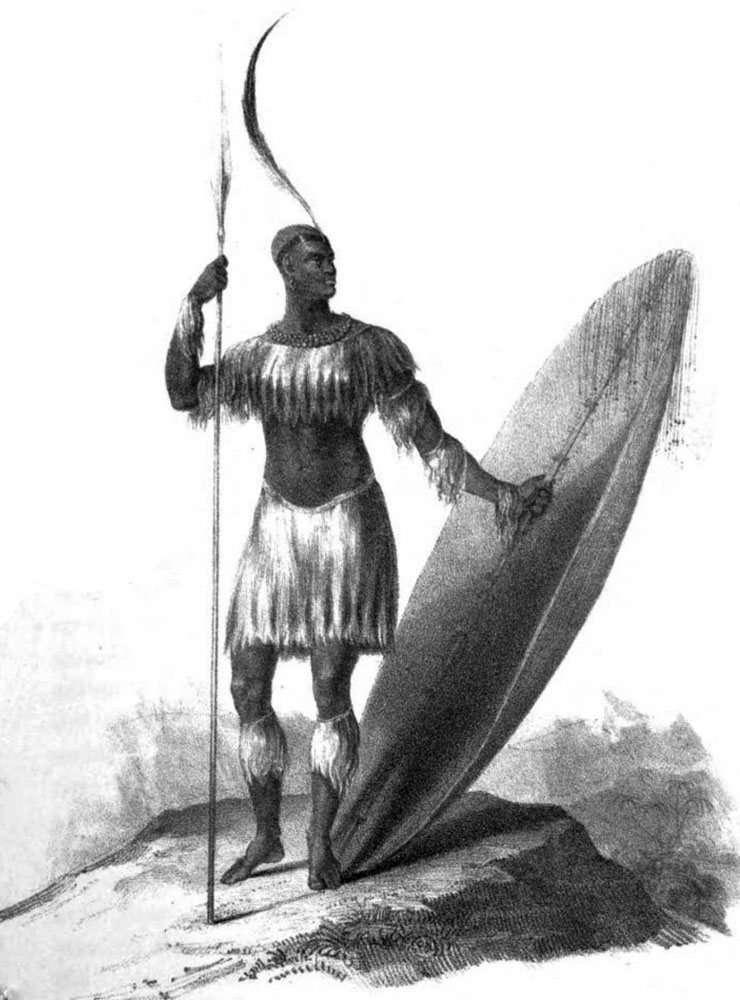
1824 European artist's impression of King Shaka with a long throwing assegai and heavy shield.

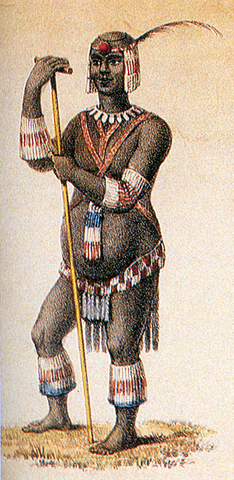
19th century artist's impression of King Dingane in ordinary dress

Shaka Zulu and his mother left the Palace of Nobamba, the seat of the Zulu monarchy, and eventually settled at the Palace of Yengweni of the Mthethwa where King Dingiswayo appointed Shaka as a general. After demonstrating military prowess, he successfully challenged Prince Sigujana and ascended to the throne of the Zulu Kingdom, succeeding King Senzangakhona, his father. The forces of King Zwide of the Ndwandwe murdered King Dingiswayo, King Shaka's suzerain, Shaka succeeded King Dingiswayo and annexed the Mthethwa and their vassals into the Zulu Kingdom. Whereas, prior to Shaka's ascendance, Lords exerted autonomy as tributaries of a suzerain such as Dingiswayo, Shaka centralised administrative functions and made the monarchy of the Zulu the locus of political power, through hitherto unprecedented conquest in the area between the Drakkensburg Mountains and Indian Ocean, annexed hundreds of other lordships and principalities.

Shaka Zulu was assassinated and succeeded by his brother, King Dingane in 1828, who relocated the capital to the Palace of Umngungundlovu, noteworthy for his assassination of Piet Retief and his compatriots in resisting the Voortrekker incursion into Zulu territory and whose defeat at the Battle of Blood River (leading to the establishment of the Natalia Republic) catalysed his unpopularity and subsequent downfall. With the assistance of Andries Pretorius, Mpande assassinated and succeeded King Dingane in 1840 at the Hlathikhulu Forest following the Battle of Magonqo, the same year that the British amnexed the Natalia Republic and formed the Natal Colony. His son, Cetshwayo was the de facto monarch from 1856, but Mpande's reign formally ended in 1872 with his death from health complications thought due to morbid obesity.

Due to the costs of running a colony and the preference of preventing the extant Boer Republics (i.e., the South African Republic and the Orange Free State) from acquiring a coastline on the Indian Ocean, the British government directed that the Governor of the Natal Colony, Sir Theophilus Shepstone, annex Zululand but retain the aristocratic structures that would allow for native self-management, thereby enabling the Zulu monarchy and its tributary chiefs to retain their relative autonomy under British imperial rule. Progressive attempts to erode the power of the Zulu monarchy (whose militant resistance to British colonial rule outweighed its function as a buffer with the Boer Republics) through the imposition of government-appointed chiefs on pseudo-historical pre-Shaka Zulu kingdoms and principalities culminated in the Anglo-Zulu War of 1879, which despite the Zulu victory at the Battle of Isandlwana led to the Boer and British alliance to partition Zululand. With his defeat at the Battle of Ulundi, Cetshwayo was exiled to Cape Town, then London, returning to civil war in Zululand, due to the secession of the Kingdom of the Mandlakazi under Zibhebhu from the Usuthu-led faction of the Zulu Kingdom.

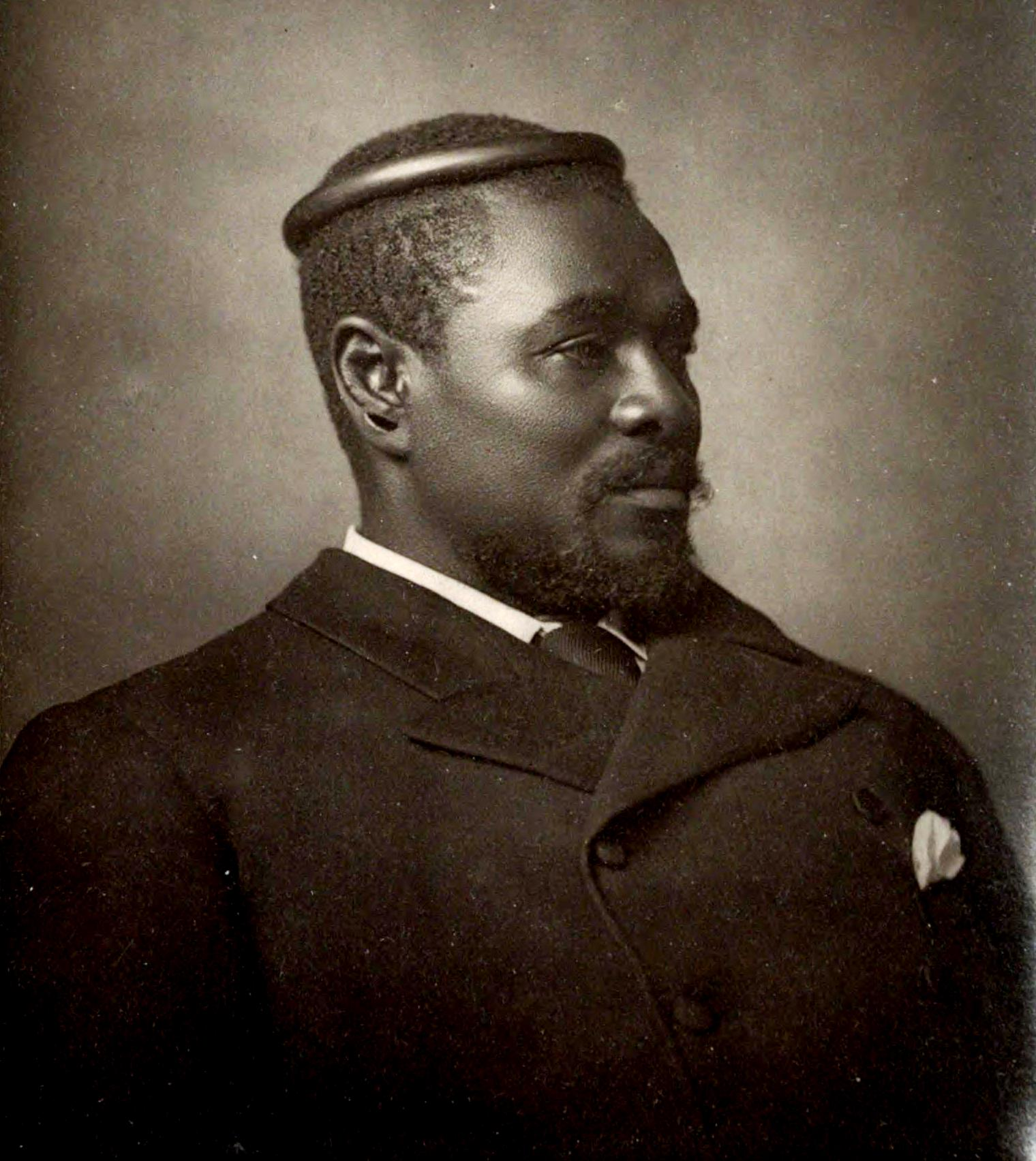
Photograph of King Cetshwayo by Alexander Bassano in Old Bond Street, London, c.1882

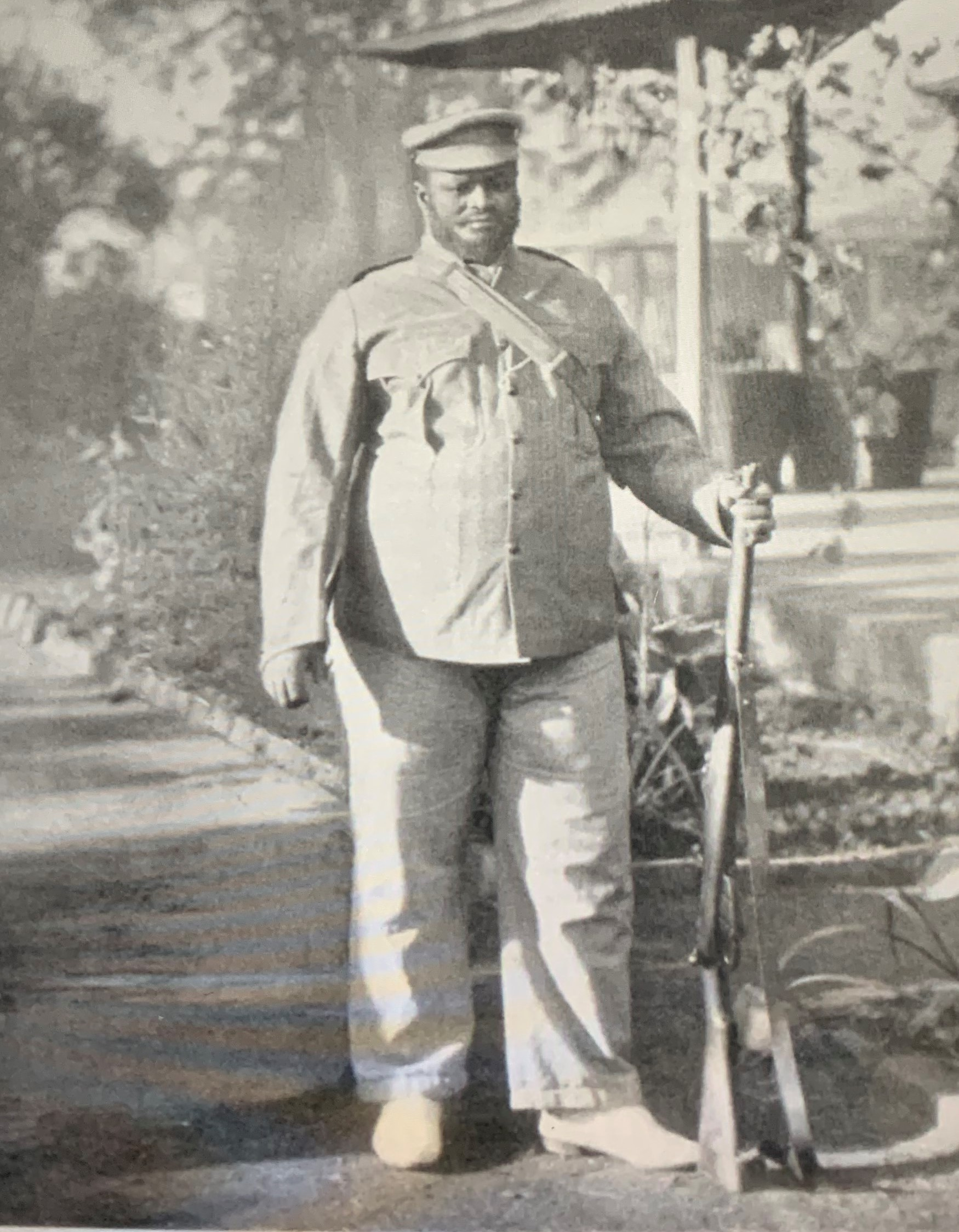
King Dinuzulu in military uniform, South Africa, ca.1888-1913

Dinuzulu succeeded Cetshwayo in 1884 with the aid of Dinuzulu's Volunteers who were rewarded with land upon which they formed the Nieuwe Republiek which was annexed into the South African Republic. He was arrested in 1906 following accusations that he fomented the Bambatha Rebellion against the British and was subsequently released by Prime Minister Louis Botha of the Union of South Africa in 1908 and died in 1913. Dinuzulu was succeeded by Solomon who founded the Inkatha yamaZulu to oppose the land policies of the Jan Smuts government and was the maternal grand uncle of Mangosuthu Buthelezi, the founder of the Inkatha Freedom Party. Due to a protracted dispute, Prince Arthur Edward Mshiyeni acted as Regent from Solomon's death in 1933 to Cyprian Bhekizulu in 1948 who was in turn succeeded by Goodwill Zwelithini in 1968. Prince Mcwayizeni Zulu acted as the Regent until 1971 while King Goodwill Zwelithini was in exile in the Transkei due to threats back home, acting as the ceremonial figurehead of KwaZulu until 1994 when he was made the ceremonial figurehead of KwaZulu-Natal. He was succeeded by King Misuzulu Zulu following his death from diabetes in 2021.

== Post-apartheid recognition ==
The Constitution of South Africa recognises traditional leadership in South Africa and subjects such leadership and the customary law which shapes it, including that of the Zulu King, to the constitution and the law of South Africa. The KwaZulu-Natal Ingonyama Trust Act of 1997 places all the land of the former KwaZulu homeland under the Ingonyama Trust of which the King is the trustee. The Traditional Leadership and Governance Framework Act of 2003 and subsequently the Traditional and Khoi-San Leadership Act state, among other things, that traditional leadership must advance the values of equality, dignity and freedom for all. It empowers the Premier of the Province to recognise traditional communities in the province and set out a framework for the traditional council tasked with overseeing that community, and it prescribes the conditions for the recognition and removal of kings including the Zulu King. In 2005, the KwaZulu-Natal Traditional Leadership and Governance Act legally recognised the Zulu King as the ceremonial head of state of KwaZulu-Natal province.

== Succession ==
The final authority for the recognition of the Zulu monarch is the President of South Africa, who by formal proclamation in the Government Gazette promulgates the ascendance of a new monarch. The President designates as monarch the person who ascends in terms of the customs of the Zulu royal family. By virtue of the fact that the Zulu Nation is formally part of South Africa and consequently subject to the laws of the Republic, the courts of South Africa have the final authority to apply those laws to determine which candidate (in the event of a succession dispute) ought to accede to the throne. Formal proclamation by the government entitles the King to emoluments provided by the state and bequeathes him with the authority to exercise powers vested in the Crown by legislation.

In terms of the customary law of the Zulu Nation, a vacancy in the throne arises when the monarch is deceased, abdicates, or is declared permanently incapacitated. When a monarch is deceased, a period of mourning follows and it is customary that a new King is not appointed until this period is over. Usually the previous monarch or a regent—in cases where the monarch is deceased or incapacitated—nominates an heir before their death who is usually expected to be a legitimate son of the King and of a Queen born of royal blood whose bridal price was paid by the nation on his behalf. Unlike monarchies that practice primogeniture such as that of the United Kingdom or of the Kingdom of the Netherlands, a vacancy in the throne is permissible.

The customs of the Zulu people are evolving as demonstrated by the fact that King Goodwill Zwelithini left the decision of a monarch to his Queen Consort & Regent, Queen Mantfombi Dlamini in his will. She appointed King Misuzulu Zulu in her will. Other claimants can contest the throne should it be unclear what the wishes of the previous King were or there be some criteria that precludes the designated successor. Where the throne is contested, especially when the claimants meet some but not all of the qualifying criteria, the royal family recognises the claimant who meets the most of these criteria and has the most support from constituencies such as the aristocracy (amakhosi), militia (amabutho), and traditional council and Prime Minister (indunankulu).

Unlike European or Japanese monarchies, there is no fixed line of succession that allows for the clear delineation of the sequence of inheritance among all lawful heirs because the King has some discretion in the designation of a successor. The rationale for not following strict agnatic primogeniture lies in fears that agnates can improve their prospects of succession by eliminating those ahead of them. Additionally, the rationale for not having an elected monarchy, is to reduce the instability from candidates and their constituencies fomenting strife to advance their cause. This was the reasoning provided for King Goodwill Zwelithini Zulu to not name an heir well before his death. Inferences about the King's preferred successor can be made from the way that the King prepares one or more of his sons to succeed him, but these inferences are unreliable.

== Coronation ==
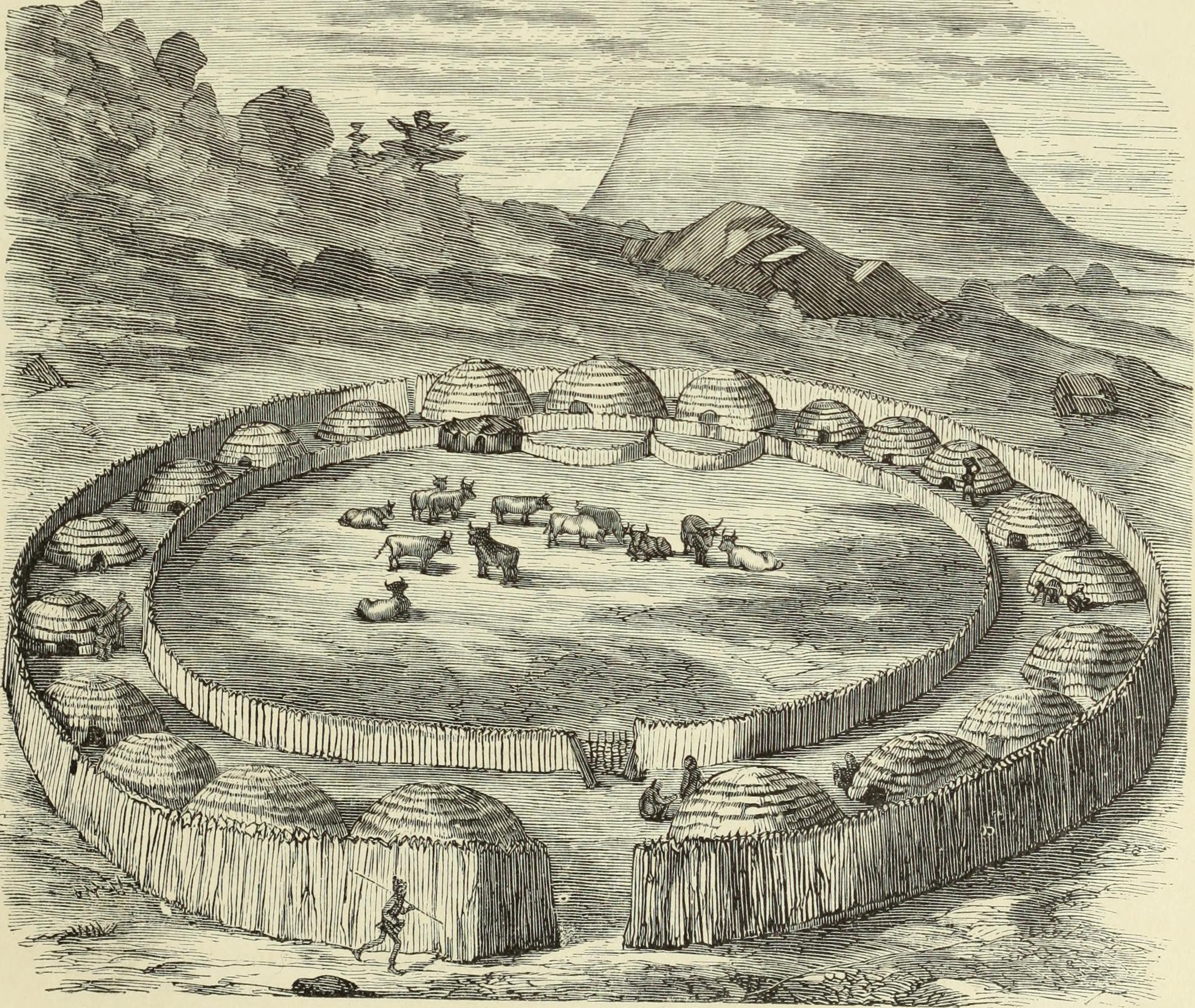
A depiction of a kraal surrounded by hunts, the type of which would be used at the ukungena esibayeni, John George Wood

The coronation (ukugcotshwa or anointing) of the Zulu king is the formal religious and secular ceremony that is required to solicit the benevolence of the gods and to unify the people behind the appointed sovereign. It is technically an enthronement since the King is not conferred with a crown i.e., in Zulu it is also referred to as ukubekwa which translates to be placed or enthroned. Preparations for the coronation are overseen by the Prime Minister. While the coronation had been solely characterised by Zulu traditional religious ritual prior to colonisation, secular and Christian elements have been introduced in keeping with the status of the Zulu king as a traditional leader in a secular republic and the royal family's conversion to and syncretic practice with the Christian religion. The rituals and rites performed as part of the broader coronation are as follows:

- Royal hunt: The King is required to hunt and kill a lion and return with its cadaver at the main palace The pelt of the lion is used as the raiment of the King when he performs the entering of the kraal.
- Entering the kraal (Ukungena esibayeni): The central and most important part of the coronation, it is characterised by the king entering the royal kraal (a cattle pen and central meeting area). Crossing the threshold of the pen for the purposes of the coronation, signifies the transubstantiation of the King from a mere royal to the spiritual leader of the Zulu people and spiritually separates the amabutho from the preceding King and binds them to the new King. This rite and the cleansing of the throne, are the only rights that necessarily takes place at the Kwakhangelamankengane Royal Palace.
- Cleansing of the throne: As part of entering the kraal, another stage takes place where the throne (both physically and metaphorically) are cleansed of the spirit of the preceding monarch as well as any curses or malign spirits, so the King's reign is purified.
- Anointing with oil (Ukugcotshwa ngamafutha): At the coronation of King Misuzulu, the Anglican Archbishop of Cape Town anointed the king with oil, given that the royal family is predominantly Anglican, but King Misuzulu converted to the Nazareth Baptist Church so it is unclear which denomination will administer future anointings.
- Conferral of the Certificate of Recognition: The President of the Republic or his appointed emissary and proxy confers the King with a certificate that symbolically represents the proclamation by the President in the Government Gazette.

== Modern powers and functions ==
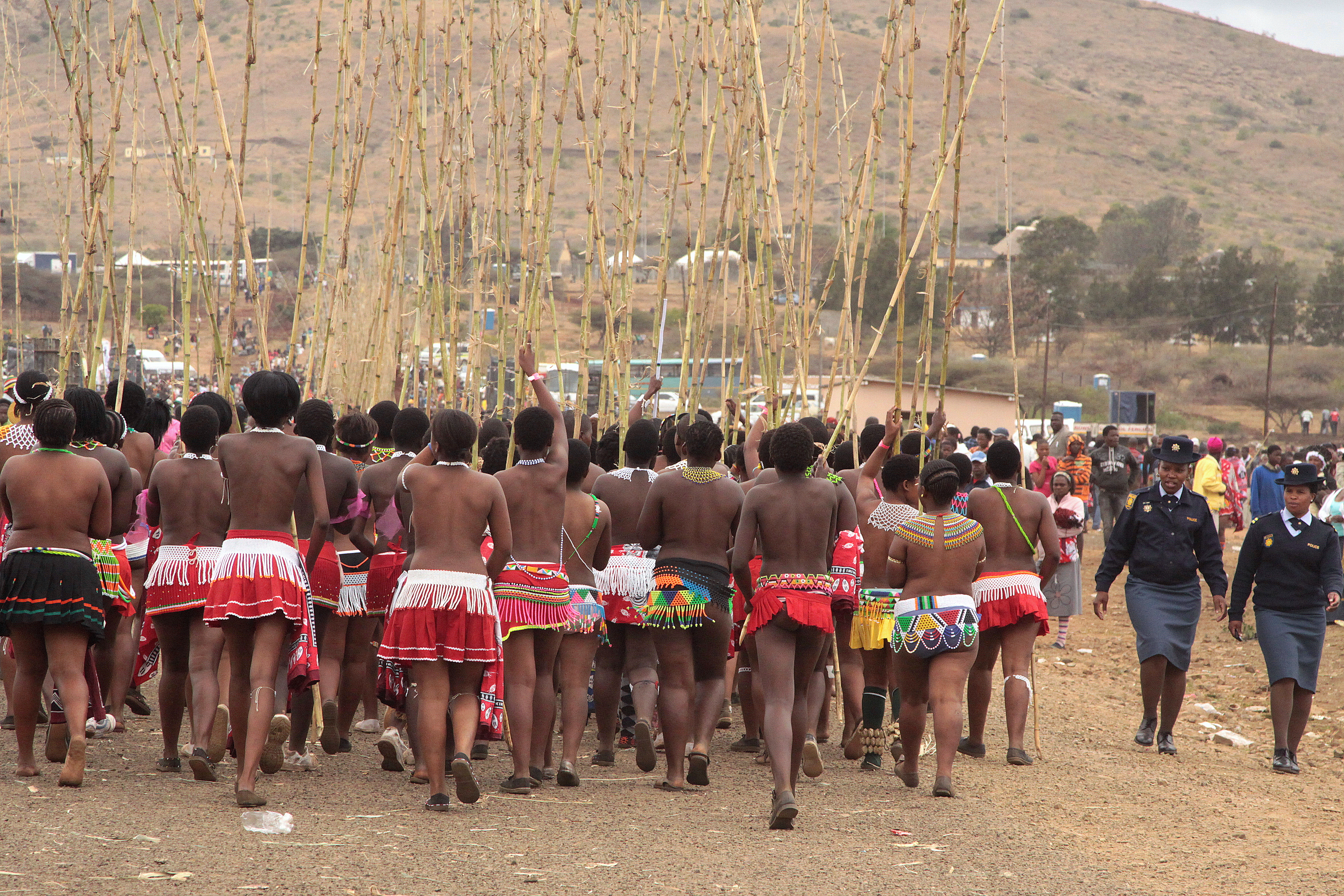
Umkhosi woMhlanga, the reed dance of the virgins (izintombi) hosted by the King

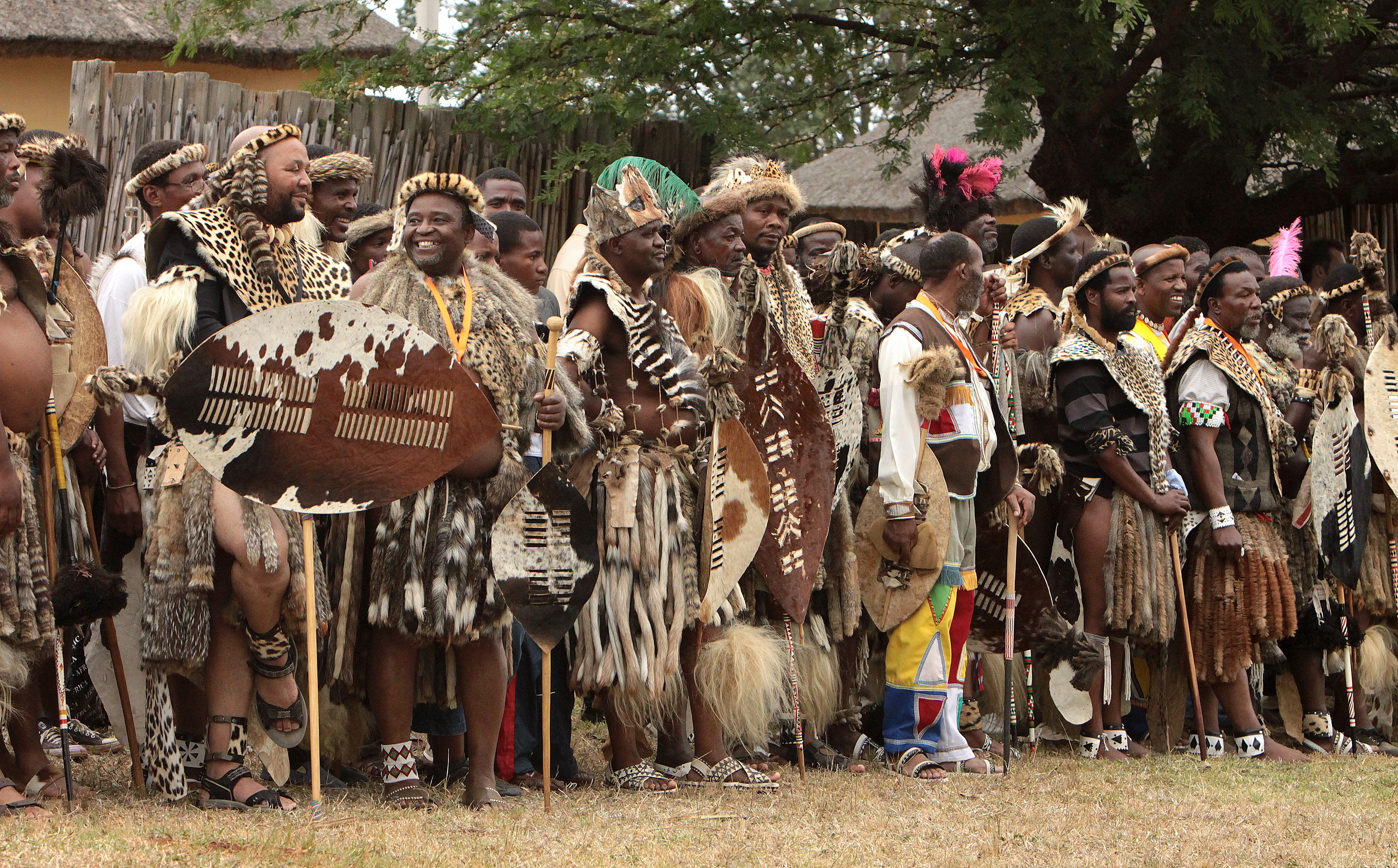
Zulu militia or regiments (amabutho) over which the King is the leader and to whom they swear fealty

During pre-colonial history, the King was an absolute monarch who was the head of state, head of government, commander-in-chief of the armed forces of the Kingdom of the Zulu and the spiritual leader of the Zulu religion. While he was endowed with vast formal powers, the support of other leadership structures influenced the extent to which he could exert those prerogatives. As the Zulu people and their lands were colonised and annexed into the Boer Republics cum British Colonies of Natal and the Transvaal, the powers of the King were circumscribed by treaties and legislation. With the formation of the semi-autonomous ethnolinguistic reservation known as KwaZulu Homeland, the King exercised predominantly reserve and ceremonial powers with respect to that area.

With the advent of a democratic state following the end of apartheid and in seeking to restore the dignity of the indigenous people, the new government recognised and delineated a formal role for the Zulu and other monarchs. In 2005, the KwaZulu-Natal Traditional Leadership and Governance Act formally designated the Zulu King as the Province of KwaZulu-Natal's ceremonial monarch and head of state.

By convention, legislation or custom, the King administers the following functions and wields the following powers:

- To deliver a speech at the annual opening of the KwaZulu-Natal Legislature
- To preserve and promote Zulu cultural heritage and identity including, but not limited to, administering, hosting or presiding over traditional festivals and rituals such as the Umhlanga Reed Dance and Umkhosi Wokweshwama (Tasting of the First Fruits)
- To represent the Zulu people to the government of South Africa and abroad
- To oversee the distribution and management of land entrusted to the Ingonyama Trust
- To oversee the traditional leadership and militia of the Zulu nation
- To serve as an ex officio member of the National House of Traditional Leaders and the KwaZulu-Natal Provincial House of Traditional Leaders
- To designate a successor and regent within parametres of customary and national law.
- To oversee matters pertaining to the Zulu royal family.
- To grant honours and awards on the advice of the KwaZulu-Natal Provincial government.

== Emoluments ==
The King's resides and works in the following palaces: Kwakhangelamankengane, Khethomthandayo, Osuthu, Dlamahlahla, Enkonyeni, and Linduzulu Palaces. Of the aforementioned, three are in Nongoma, a town in KwaZulu-Natal that is the de facto official seat of the Zulu King and royal family. The King receives a salary of approximately R1 million and the Zulu royal court receives emoluments of up to R79 million from the government (2023/2024 financial year)

== Titles and styles ==
The titles of the Zulu king in the Zulu language do not have direct translations to English. The notion of titles and styles as it exists in a Eurocentric context also does not translate directly. The Zulu titles of the King are as follows:

Title	Short Form	Direct Translation	Meaning
Isilo samaBandla Onke	Isilo	The Beast or Lion of All the Nations	Denotes an imperial status, i.e., rule over multiple other nations and groups
Ingonyama yamaZulu	Ingonyama	The Lion of the Zulu	
Ndabezitha		The One who is Renowned even among His Enemies	Was the name of a prominent leader, that became used for "Your or His Majesty".

In English, the King has the style "His Majesty" (or in the second-person "Your Majesty").
