= Goodwill Zwelithini =

King of the Zulu nation from 1968 to 2021

Goodwill Zwelithini kaBhekuzulu
- ISilo Samabandla Onke
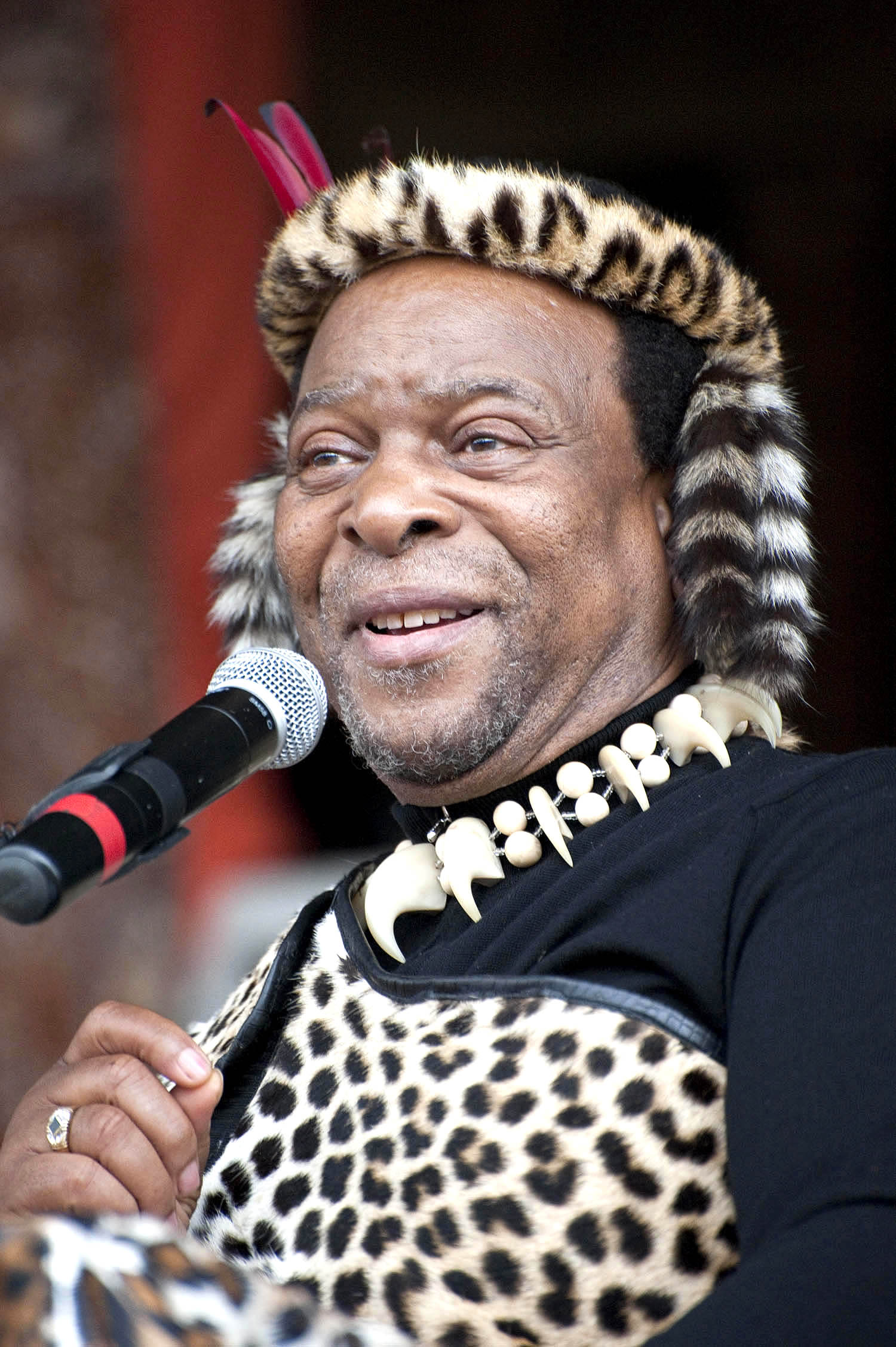
- Zwelithini in 2011

King of the Zulu Nation (Note: As King of the Zulus, Goodwill Zwelithini was recognised as the ceremonial Head of State of the Province of Kwazulu-Natal from 2005 until his death.)
- Reign: 17 September 1968 – 12 March 2021
- Coronation: 3 December 1971
- Predecessor: Cyprian Bhekuzulu kaSolomon
- Successor: Misuzulu Sinqobile kaZwelithini
- Born: 27 July 1948; Nongoma, Natal, Union of South Africa
- Died: 12 March 2021 (aged 72); Durban, KwaZulu-Natal, South Africa
- Wives: Sibongile Winifred Dlamini; Buthle MaMathe; Princess Shiyiwe Mantfombi Dlamini of Eswatini (Great Wife); Thandekile Jane Ndlovu; Nompumelelo Mchiza; Zola Zelusiwe Mafu
- Issue: 29 including: Prince Lethukuthula; Princess Sibusile; Princess Nqobangothando; King Misuzulu; Princess Ntandoyesizwe; Princess Nandi; Princess Nomkhosi; Princess Bukhosibemvelo; Prince Shlobosenkosi; Princess Nombuso; Prince Nhlendlayenkosi; Prince Nhlanganiso; Prince Nhlangano; Prince Buzabazi; Princess Cebolabo; Princess Mukelile; Prince Sihlangu; Prince Phumuzuzulu; Princess Sinethemba; Princess Ntombizosuthu; Princess Ntandoyenkosi; Prince Butho (deceased); Prince Lungelo; Prince Mandlesizwe; Prince Bizwekhaya; Prince Masikomahle; Prince Simakade; Prince Malanga; Prince Thokozani Shabangu
Names
- Goodwill Zwelithini kaBhekuzulu
Regnal name
- Umdlokombane
- House: House of Zulu
- Father: King Cyprian Bhekuzulu kaSolomon
- Mother: Queen Thomozile Jezangani kaNdwandwe
- Religion: Anglican Church

Goodwill Zwelithini kaBhekuzulu (27 July 1948 – 12 March 2021) was the King of the Zulu Nation from 1968 to his death in 2021.

He became King in December 1971 after the death of his father, King Cyprian Bhekuzulu, who died in September 1968. Prince Israel Mcwayizeni acted as the regent from 1968 to 1971 while the King took refuge in KwaNdebele, Northern Transvaal province of South Africa for three years under care of his brother-in-law Prince Klaas Mahlangu of KwaNdebele, who was married to his eldest sister, Princess Orah Nonhlanhla kaBhekuzulu, to avoid then rumoured assassination. After his 21st birthday and his first marriage, Zwelithini was installed as the eighth monarch of the Zulus at a traditional ceremony at Nongoma on 3 December 1971, attended by 20,000 people. Zwelithini died on 12 March 2021, aged 72, after reportedly being admitted to hospital for diabetes-related illness. During preparations for his funeral, the king's traditional prime minister, Mangosuthu Buthelezi, announced that he had died of COVID-19.

== Political role ==
In the power vacuum created in the 1990s as Apartheid and the domination of the country by White South Africans was abolished, the King was increasingly drawn to partisan politics. The KwaZulu-Natal headquartered Inkatha Freedom Party (IFP) initially opposed parts of the new constitution advocated by the African National Congress (ANC) regarding the internal governance of KwaZulu. In particular, the IFP campaigned aggressively for an autonomous and sovereign Zulu king, as constitutional head of state. As a result, the IFP abstained from registering its party for the 1994 election until the king's role in the new democracy was clarified. Mandela and president De Klerk arranged a special meeting where it was agreed that international mediators would be called to try and sort out the issue of the king after the elections. As a result, the IFP was registered for the elections. But Mandela and De Klerk reneged from the agreement of bringing international mediators after the elections. It demonstrated its political strength by taking the majority of the provincial votes for KwaZulu-Natal in the said election.

Although the constitution makes the role of the King largely ceremonial, it is incumbent upon him to act on the official advice of the provincial premier. On occasion, South African President Nelson Mandela made efforts to bypass the IFP in negotiating with the Zulus, instead making direct overtures to the King (Mandela's daughter, Zeni, is married to Prince Thumbumuzi Dlamini, a brother of King Zwelithini's Great Wife, Queen Mantfombi). Nonetheless, the IFP remained in power in the province until 2003.

During most of the King's reign, his uncle, Mangosuthu Buthelezi, Prince of KwaPhindangene and founder/head of Inkatha Freedom Party, was the Zulu prime minister. King Zwelithini's grandfather, King Solomon kaDinuzulu, was the eldest brother of Princess Magogo; Prince Mangosuthu's mother. But, in September 1994, tension between the previously allied kinsmen peaked publicly as the annual Shaka Zulu celebration approached. Rumours that the King was manoeuvring to replace Buthelezi as Zulu prime minister with former regent Prince Mcwayizeni, who had joined the ANC in 1990, seemed likely after the King announced that Buthelezi would no longer be his chief advisor, and simultaneously cancelled the holiday ceremony. For his safety, federal troops escorted King Zwelithini by helicopter to Johannesburg. Although Buthelezi was then serving as Minister of Home Affairs in South Africa's Cabinet, President Mandela's efforts to broker a reconciliation failed. Buthelezi moved the event from Nongoma to Stanger, and addressed a throng of 10,000 of his Zulu supporters.

Subsequently, the King's spokesman, Prince Sifiso Zulu, was being interviewed on television at the South African Broadcasting Corporation's studio when Buthelezi and his bodyguards forcibly interrupted the programme, physically intimidating Prince Sifiso. The televised incident drew national attention and a public rebuke from Mandela, prompting Buthelezi to apologise to the Zulu Royal Family, Cabinet and nation for his behaviour. Relations between Zwelithini and Buthelezi later improved.

King Zwelithini has cooperated as the law requires with the ANC since it took over the reins of government in KwaZulu-Natal. The King's finances are controlled by KwaZulu-Natal provincial authorities.

In 1989 he criticized the ANC leadership for not inviting him and Buthelezi to a rally welcoming back the Rivonia Trial defendants, who had been released after almost three decades of imprisonment.

As the constitutional monarch of the kingdom of KwaZulu-Natal, he was head of the Ubukhosi, the state-recognized institution of Traditional Leadership that consists of local chiefs. His leadership role also entailed chairmanship of the Usuthu Tribal Authority and Nongoma Regional Authority, both established under the provisions of the KwaZulu Amakhosi and Iziphakanyiswa Act. In his address upon the opening of the Provincial Parliament on 28 September 2003, the King advised the government and legislators to give more heed to the Ubukhosi:

Traditional Leaders are neither consulted nor involved in the process of formulating policies that have a direct bearing on their day to day activities. The institution of Ubukhosi has been in existence from time immemorial and has survived many hardships under past colonial regimes. From the point of view of the ordinary citizen, an Inkosi's most important role may lie in his symbolizing of community solidarity. So any notion that the institution of Ubukhosi, now that we have a democratic government in place, can just be wished away, remains a pipe-dream. Some countries just across our borders had decided to do away with the institution of traditional leadership immediately after attaining independence from colonial rulers. However, they have since realised that they had committed gross mistakes and were now re-inventing these institutions at great costs. As King of the Zulu Nation I am proud of the role played by the Prime Minister of the Zulu Nation, Prince of KwaPhindangene, Dr MG Buthelezi who had singlehandedly championed the cause of the Institution of Traditional Leadership in this country.

== Cultural role ==
The King was chairman of the Ingonyama Trust, a corporate entity established to administer the land traditionally owned by the king for the benefit, material welfare and social well-being of the Zulu nation. This land consists of 32% of the area of KwaZulu/Natal.

As the custodian of Zulu traditions and customs, King Zwelithini revived cultural functions such as the Umhlanga, the colourful and symbolic reed dance ceremony which, amongst other things, promotes moral awareness and HIV/AIDS education among Zulu women. In 2010, Zwelithini re-established the traditional practice of male circumcision to combat HIV/AIDS; the rite of passage had been abolished in the 19th century by King Shaka, who believed it hindered military readiness. The King also revived the Ukweshwama, the first fruits ceremony, which is a traditional function involving certain traditional rituals including the killing of a bull. The latter ceremony was subject to a lawsuit brought in November 2009 by Animal Rights Africa, alleging that the method of killing the animal was cruel and barbaric. He has also traveled abroad extensively to promote tourism and trade in the West for KwaZulu-Natal, and to fundraise for Zulu-supported charities, often accompanied by one of his queens consort. On such occasions he was frequently officially hosted by local Zulu organizations, and granted audiences to Zulus living abroad.

In June 1994, the University of Zululand conferred an honorary doctorate in agriculture upon the King. He was Chancellor of the South African branch of the American-based Newport University. In March 1999 Coker College of South Carolina awarded him an honorary doctorate in law. During the first half of 2001 he was inaugurated as Chancellor of the ML Sultan Technikon in KwaZulu-Natal.

The King's authorized biography, King of Goodwill, was published in 2003. The musical dramatization of this work premiered at the Market Theatre, Johannesburg on 16 March 2005.

The King spoke at The Synagogue Church Of All Nations in Lagos, Nigeria, in 2004 regarding the importance of trade and peace.

== Controversies ==
In January 2012, while speaking at an event commemorating the 133rd anniversary of the Battle of Isandlwana, the King caused controversy with his statement that same-sex relations were "rotten". His statements were condemned by the South African Human Rights Commission as well as LGBT rights groups. President Jacob Zuma rebuked the king for his comments. The Zulu Royal Household later said that the King's comments had been mistranslated and that he had not condemned same-sex relations, only expressed concern about a state of moral decay in South Africa that has led to widespread sexual abuse, including male-on-male sexual abuse.

In September 2012, King Goodwill Zwelithini asked the KwaZulu-Natal government for R18 million to build new property, including a new R6 million palace for his youngest wife Queen Mafu and upgrades to Queen MaMchiza's palace. The King's royal household department CFO, Mduduzi Mthembu, told a parliamentary committee that the money was needed. The department also requested $1.4 million USD for improvements to Queen MaMchiza's palace. The government had already budgeted around $6.9 million USD for the royal family during 2012, not for the first time prompting accusations of lavish spending; in 2008, opposition parties criticised King Zwelithini's wives for spending around $24,000 USD on linen, designer clothes, and expensive holidays.

Speaking at Phongolo UPhongolo Local Municipality community meeting in March 2015, King Zwelithini acknowledged that while other nations had participated in efforts which led to South Africa's liberation, that should not be considered an excuse for foreigners to cause inconvenience in the country now by competing with locals for scarce economic opportunities. Contending that he was free to say what politicians were not, he asked that foreigners please return to their native lands since, he maintained, South African nationals in diaspora had not gone on to open businesses in host countries. These observations were made during a time of growing unease between South Africans and non-nationals, violence having erupted in Soweto in January and spread to KwaZulu-Natal, resulting in three deaths. The Democratic Alliance's spokesman, calling for a public retraction and apology, criticised the remarks as "highly irresponsible", while a SAHRC official labelled them xenophobic in light of recent attacks on foreigners. Alleged to have sparked violence against non-nationals, although Zwelithini's remarks about anti-social behaviour and the desirability of foreigners believed responsible leaving South Africa did not distinguish between legal and illegal immigrants, his spokesman subsequently said that he was referring only to those present in the country illegally.

== Wives and children ==
King Goodwill Zwelithini had six wives and around 40 children. These include

1. MaDlamini of Kwa-Khethomthandayo Royal House, Nongoma, (born Sibongile Winifred Dlamini), married 27 December 1969 at St Margaret's Church, Nongoma.
  1. Prince Lethukuthula Zulu (by Ndlunkulu Sibongile MaDlamini), born 1970 - died 2020.
  2. Princess Nombuso Zulu (by Ndlunkulu Sibongile MaDlamini), owner of Durban-based Ilembe Catering Services, born 1973.
  3. Princess Ntombizosuthu Ka Zwelithini Duma (by Ndlunkulu Sibongile MaDlamini), a businesswoman who co-owns Strategic Persuasions and Zamalwandle Transport Logistics with her husband. Born 1979, married to Mbongiseni Duma, a Johannesburg-based businessman.
  4. Princess Ntandoyenkosi Ka Zwelithini Ngcaweni (by Ndlunkulu Sibongile MaDlamini), an Asset Manager at the Public Investment Corporation (PIC), born 1982. Married to Busani Ngcaweni, who headed the office of the former Deputy President of the Republic of South Africa, Kgalema Motlanthe.
  5. Princess Sinethemba Bati Zulu (by Ndlunkulu Sibongile Dlamini), born 1989, pursued a degree in International Relations, at the University of Witwatersrand.
2. Buhle KaMathe of Kwa-Dlamahlahla Royal House, Nongoma, born c. 1951. In May 1996, she and her daughter were seriously wounded in an assault during which they were clubbed, stabbed and shot.
  1. Princess Sibusile Zulu (by Ndlunkulu Buhle KaMathe), born 1972.
  2. Princess Nandi Zulu (by Ndlunkulu Buhle KaMathe), born 1977, married (civil) 6 December 2002 in St John's Cathedral, Mthatha, by Bishop Sitembele Mzamane and (traditional) 7 December at the Thembu Great Place near Qunu, to Chief Mfundo Bovulengwa Mtirara, born 25 March 1973, Acting Deputy Paramount Chief of the Thembu from 2000, Chief of the Matye'ngqina Traditional Authority Area.
  3. Prince Phumuzuzulu (by Ndlunkulu Buhle KaMathe – Phumuza), named after his great grandfather King Phumuzululu kaDinuzulu, son of King kaCetshwayo
  4. Prince Nhlanganiso Zulu (by Ndlunkulu Buhle KaMathe), married Wandile
  5. Prince Buzabazi, proposed to succeed his father by a royal faction
  6. late Prince Butho Zulu
  7. Princess Khonza Zulu
  8. Prince Shlobosenkosi Zulu (by Ndlunkulu Buhle KaMathe), born 1988, studied at Kearsney College in Botha's Hill, Durban.
3. Mantfombi Dlamini, of Kwa-Khangelamankengane Royal House, Nongoma, the Great Wife, 1953–2021, daughter of Sobhuza II of Swaziland and sister of King Mswati III, married 1977. Her Highness was also a member of the Seventh-day Adventist Church, and was the acting regent upon her husband's death.
  1. King Misuzulu Zulu (by Ndlunkulu Mantfombi), born 23 September 1974 in Kwahlabisa, KwaZulu-Natal, with a degree in International Studies from Jacksonville, Florida, King of Zulu from 7 May 2021. He is married and has two children with his wife. Educated at St. Charles College, Pietermaritzburg
  2. Princess Ntandoyesizwe Zulu (by Ndlunkulu Mantfombi), born 1976, married 13 April 2002 at Enyokeni Royal Palace, Nongoma, to late Prince Oupa Moilwa, Chief of the Bahurutshe BagaMoilwa. Civil ceremony 11 July 2004, in Pongola. Educated at St. John's Diocesan School for Girls, Pietermaritzburg
  3. Princess Nomkhosi (by Ndlunkulu Mantfombi), born 1978, fiancee Melusi Moyo. Educated at The Wykeham Collegiate
  4. Prince Bambindlovu (Makhosezwe), born 1981 (by Ndlunkulu Mantfombi) a farmer, interior designer and artist. Educated at St. Charles College, Pietermaritzburg
  5. Princess Bukhosibemvelo, (by Ndlunkulu Mantfombi), born 1985, married Sipho Nyawo, who paid 120 cows as part of the ilobolo for her. Educated at Epworth School, Pietermaritzburg
  6. Prince Lungelo, born 1984 (by Ndlunkulu Mantfombi), once a student at Michaelhouse boarding school in KwaZulu-Natal.
  7. Prince Mandlesizwe, born 1990 (by Ndlunkulu Mantfombi)
  8. Prince Simangaye, born 1991 (by Ndlunkulu Mantfombi)
4. Thandekile "Thandi" Jane Ndlovu of Linduzulu Royal House, Nongoma, married 1988
  1. Prince Sihlangu Zulu (by Ndlunkulu Thandi), artist by name zulusoul
  2. Princess Mukelile Zulu (by Ndlunkulu Thandi)
5. Nompumelelo Mchiza of oSuthu/enyokeni Royal House, Nongoma, married 25 July 1992.
  1. Princess Nqobangothando Zulu (by Ndlunkulu Nompumelelo)
  2. Prince Nhlangano Zulu (by Ndlunkulu Nompumelelo)
  3. Princess Cebo Zulu (by Ndlunkulu Nompumelelo)
6. Zola Zelusiwe Mafu of Ondini Royal House, Ulundi, born c. 1986, married 2014.
  1. Prince Nhlendlayenkosi Zulu (by Ndlunkulu LaMafu)

== See also ==
- List of Zulu kings

Regnal titles
| Preceded by Cyprian Bhekuzulu kaSolomon | King of the Zulu Nation; 1968–2021 | Succeeded by Mantfombi Dlamini (as Regent) |
