= Mike Antelme =

South African rugby union player

- Full name: Joseph George Michel Antelme
- Born: 23 April 1934 Durban, South Africa
- Died: 26 October 2023 (aged 89)
- Height: 1.80 m (5 ft 11 in)
- Weight: 79.4 kg (175 lb)
- School: St. Charles College
- Occupation: Land surveyor

Rugby union career
- Position: Wing three–quarter
Provincial / State sides
Years	Team	Apps	(Points)
- Natal
International career
Years	Team	Apps	(Points)
1960–61	South Africa	5	(0)

Joseph George Michel Antelme (23 April 1934 – 26 October 2023) was a South African international rugby union player active in the 1950s and 1960s.

Born in Durban, Antelme was the son of Franco-Mauritian Special Operations Executive agent France Antelme and attended St. Charles College, Pietermaritzburg, from where he is the first Springbok.

Antelme was a hard–running Natal winger and gained five Springboks caps. He appeared on the right wing for all four home Test matches against the All Blacks in 1960. A member of their 1960–61 tour of Europe, Antelme began with three tries in the opening fixture against Southern Counties, but his only international was the final Test match in Paris.

== See also ==
- List of South Africa national rugby union players
