= Akech (queen) =

De facto ruler in East Africa who flourished from 1760 until 1787

Akech was a ruler in East Africa from 1760 until 1787.

Akech was the second wife of Rwoth Nyabongo, ruler of the chiefdom of Paroketu. The royal line of succession had up until this point been patrilineal, and in due course Nyabongo would have been succeeded by Jobi, the eldest son of Akura, his senior wife. Akech, however, enjoyed a position in religious leadership, which augmented her royal standing, and she used this to consolidate her own power; consequently, by 1760 she had risen to get political prominence not only as the wife of the chief and as a ritual leader, but as mother of the successor to the throne. Her son Roketu later came to power; his people then came to be known as the Pa-Akech, or "people of Akech", recognizing the fact that she had founded a ruling dynasty. Little else is recorded of Akech, save that she was a member of a clan of the Bunyoro.
