= Misuzulu kaZwelithini =

King of the Zulu nation since 2021

- ISilo Samabandla Onke
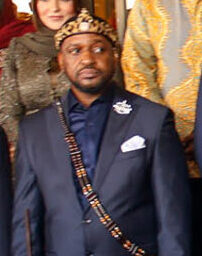
- King Misuzulu in 2026

King of the Zulu Nation and Monarch of KwaZulu-Natal (Note: As King of the Zulus, Misuzulu is recognised as the ceremonial Head of State of the Province of KwaZulu-Natal.)
- Reign: 7 May 2021 – present
- Coronation: 29 October 2022
- Predecessor: Goodwill Zwelithini kaBhekuzulu
- Born: 23 September 1974 (age 52); Hlabisa, KwaZulu (present-day Kwazulu-Natal), South Africa
- Spouse: Ntokozo KaMayisela (1st wife/Great Wife); Nozizwe Mulela (2nd wife); Nomzamo Myeni (3rd wife); Sihle Mdluli (4th wife)
- Issue: Lwandle kaMisuzulu; Mandulo KaMisuzulu; Simezwini; Jubezizweni
Names
- Misuzulu Sinqobile kaZwelithini
Regnal name
- Indlulamithi
- House: House of Zulu
- Father: Goodwill Zwelithini kaBhekuzulu
- Mother: Mantfombi Dlamini Zulu of eSwatini
- Religion: Anglican Church until 2024; Shembe Church since 2024

Misuzulu Sinqobile kaZwelithini (born 23 September 1974) is the reigning King of the Zulu Nation and Monarch of KwaZulu-Natal. Misuzulu is the second-oldest surviving son of King Goodwill Zwelithini kaBhekuzulu, and Great Wife, Queen Mantfombi Dlamini Zulu. Misuzulu became heir presumptive after the death of his father on 12 March 2021.

Although he was officially appointed as the king of the Zulu nation on 7 May 2021, his traditional coronation did not take place until 20 August 2022. The King was crowned and recognised by the Government on 29 October 2022.

== Personal life and education ==
King Misuzulu completed his early schooling in Eswatini, his mother's home country, and later attended high school in South Africa, at St. Charles College, Pietermaritzburg. On 6 May 2021, a day before his mother's funeral service, King Misuzulu married his long-time girlfriend, Ntokozo Mayisela. The couple met in August 2009 during the royal wedding of King Misuzulu's sister, Princess Bukhosibemvelo and former Transnet executive Sipho Nyawo, at the Durban Botanic Gardens.

On 13 May 2021, King Misuzulu sent a delegation to Mayisela's home to negotiate and pay lobola in terms of Zulu marriage custom. The lobola was reported to consist of eight cows and fifty thousand South African Rand.

Some sources claim that he has a degree in international studies, while others state that he is still pursuing the degree, in Jacksonville, Florida. He has two children with his wife, Ntokozo Mayisela, and another child with Princess Wezizwe Sigcau of amaMpondo royalty.

He is also paternal cousin to AmaRharhabe King Jonguxolo Sandile.

== Accession to the throne ==
Despite being King Goodwill Zwelithini's third oldest surviving son, King Misuzulu's accession to the throne was not instant. Historically, King Misuzulu's claim to the throne would have been automatic, but the Zulu Kingdom now considers itself a constitutional monarchy, the leader of which must be appointed. King Goodwill Zwelithini's Great Wife, Queen Mantfombi Dlamini, was appointed regent during the interregnum and, on 24 March 2021, Prince Mangosuthu Buthelezi issued a statement on behalf of the Zulu Royal Family stating that the new king would only be announced after the three-month mourning period for the late King Goodwill Zwelithini. King Goodwill Zwelithini's will gave the responsibility of appointing the next king to Queen Mantfombi.

Immediately after the death of King Misuzulu's father, historians and cultural experts predicted that King Misuzulu would be the one appointed to the throne, as he was the son of the late King and the late King's Great Wife, giving him increased status among the late King's other 28 children. At the time, some senior members of the royal family called the debate over succession "premature". At King Goodwill Zwelithini's funeral service, the late king's sister, Princess Thembi Ndlovu stated that the royal family did not yet know who the next king would be and that the individual would be "chosen by God".

On 29 April 2021, approximately 7 weeks after the death of King Goodwill Zwelithini, Queen Regent Mantfombi Dlamini herself died from an unspecified illness, without having publicly appointed the next Zulu monarch. However, on 7 May 2021, at the public reading of the late Queen's will, it emerged that she had appointed King Misuzulu as the next king of the Zulu nation. The announcement was met with protest from certain members of the royal family and King Misuzulu, present at the reading of the will, was escorted away to safety by the South African Police Service and a security detail from Eswatini.

Misuzulu entered the royal kraal and the royal hunt took place on the night of 19 August 2022, until the early hours of 20 August 2022.

The king's coronation took place on the 29th of October 2022 and was attended by Cyril Ramaphosa, Jacob Zuma, David Mabuza, Mswati III, Patrice Motsepe, Thabo Mbeki and many politicians, actors, actresses, journalists, royals, musicians and crowds of people. The coronation took place at the Moses Mabhida Stadium. Roads in the city were closed.

== Legal dispute ==
On 2 May 2021, media reports revealed that court papers had been filed in the Pietermaritzburg High Court challenging the validity of the late King Goodwill Zwelithini's will. The court challenge was launched by the late King's first wife, Sibongile Winifred Dlamini, and the two daughters she had with the King, Princess Ntandoyenkosi and Princess Ntombizosuthu. They sought to have the King's will declared invalid and set aside, on the basis of what they claimed was a fraudulent signature. As an interim measure, they also filed a court application seeking to interdict the appointment of a new king or regent, pending the court's ruling on the validity of the late king's will.

The King's first wife is not to be confused with the King's Great Wife, who was actually his third wife, but who held precedence over all other wives as she was from royalty herself, being a member of the Swazi royal family. The late king married his first wife in terms of South Africa's civil marriages laws, but married his subsequent wives in terms of Zulu custom only, because while South African law recognises polygamous customary marriages, it does not recognise polygamous civil marriages. The court challenge revolved around the validity of customary marriages subsequent to the first civil marriage, as well as an allegation that the signature on the late king's will was forged. The matter was set down for hearing on 7 May 2021, the same day King Misuzulu was publicly appointed king. The hearing of 7 May 2021 was heard in chambers, and postponed, with the litigant princesses later claiming they had no idea that Misuzulu would be appointed king later that day.

On 21 May 2021, Princess Ntandoyenkosi and Princess Ntombizosuthu headed back to court in a bid to interdict the coronation of Misuzulu. In particular, the court papers sought an order interdicting the Premier of KwaZulu-Natal from taking any steps which would formally recognise Misuzulu as king of the Zulu nation, or alternatively, interdicting President Cyril Ramaphosa from issuing the certificate of recognition to Misuzulu. In terms of section 9(2)(b) of South Africa's Traditional Leadership and Governance Framework Act, official recognition of a king or queen must be done by way of issuing a presidential certificate of recognition and publication of the recognition in the Government Gazette.

The Pietermaritzburg High Court agreed to adjourn the matter to allow for the princesses to consolidate it with the earlier court application which contested the validity of the late King Goodwill Zwelithini's will. The High Court's order required that the parties file additional court papers in both matters by 18 June 2021. By that time it was unclear whether the Zulu Royal Family would continue with the coronation despite the matter being before the courts.

On 2 March 2022, the High Court dismissed the challenge to Misuzulu's succession to the throne allowing the coronation to go ahead. Presiding judge, Isaac Madondo, said, "There was no dispute... No grievances were lodged, and no-one else is laying claim to the throne." While the case regarding the alleged signature forgery of the late King Goodwill Zwelithini's will was set to continue, the judge stated that regardless of what was in a will, the matter of choosing new Zulu leadership was the prerogative of the Zulu Royal Family using Zulu customary laws and traditions. He said that in accordance to those laws, the great wife, being royalty herself, is the king's heir, and that the authenticity of her will is not being contested. On 16 March President Ramaphosa issued the certificate of recognition of Misuzulu as King of AmaZulu.

On 4 August 2022, news emerged that the King's coronation would be set to take place on the 20th of August 2022 despite members of the Zulu royal family challenging the coronation of Misuzulu via the Supreme Court of Appeal.

== Controversies ==
In August 2025, the king faced a backlash after his advisers proposed that each Zulu pay R10 a month towards the funding of the Zulu nation, arguing that this would reduce dependence on government, which provides R86.1 million annually. The king distanced himself from this proposal.

Regnal titles
Preceded by Goodwill Zwelithini (as King); Mantfombi Dlamini (as Queen Regent)	King of the Zulu Nation; 2021–present	Incumbent; Heir: Jubezizweni
