= Mcwayizeni Zulu =

South African politician and Zulu prince (1931–1999)

Member of the National Assembly
- In office May 1994 – June 1999

Personal details
- Born: 3 March 1931 Nongoma, Natal; Union of South Africa
- Died: 7 September 1999 (aged 68) Johannesburg, South Africa
- Party: African National Congress

Prince Mcwayizeni Israel Zulu (3 March 1931 – 7 September 1999) was a South African politician and senior prince of the Zulu royal family. A son of King Solomon kaDinizulu, he acted as Zulu regent during the interregnum of 1968 to 1971 and was a close advisor to King Goodwill Zwelithini. He is also known for having overtly aligned himself to the African National Congress (ANC) during the final years of apartheid.

Mcwayizeni's role in the royal house was fraught during the early decades of Zwelithini's reign after 1971, primarily because of Mcwayizeni's rivalry with Mangosuthu Buthelezi, his cousin and the ruler of the KwaZulu homeland during apartheid. Mcwayizeni questioned Buthelezi's claim to be the traditional prime minister to the Zulu nation, and he was increasingly sidelined by Buthelezi during the late 1970s and 1980s. In addition, in 1989, Mcwayizeni declared his support for the ANC, which at the time was locked in violent competition with Buthelezi's own Zulu nationalist party, Inkatha.

Mcwayizeni served on the ANC's National Executive Committee from 1991 to 1994 and, after the end of apartheid and dissolution of KwaZulu, he represented the ANC in the National Assembly from 1994 to 1999. He reconciled with Zwelithini in 1994 but remained in competition with Buthelezi until his death in September 1999.

== Early life and career ==
Mcwayizeni was born on 3 March 1931 in Nongoma in the former Natal Province. His father was King Solomon kaDinizulu and his half-brother, Cyprian Bhekuzulu, became King of the Zulus in the 1940s. After Cyprian's death, Mcwayizeni acted as regent of the Zulu kingdom from 1968 until 1971, during the interregnum before Cyprian's son, King Goodwill Zwelithini, was crowned. In Mcwayizeni's account, he was the most senior Zulu prince under Zwelithini, because he was the eldest son born to King Solomon's favoured wife.

=== Dispute with Buthelezi ===
Zwelithini's inauguration in 1971 marked the beginning of a decades-long rivalry between Mcwayizeni and Prince Mangosuthu Buthelezi, Mcwayizeni's first cousin. Buthelezi claimed that he had acted as "traditional prime minister" – a close adviser – to Zwelithini's father and that Zwelithini had reappointed him to the same role. Mcwayizeni was outspoken in disputing the legitimacy of Buthelezi's claim, arguing that Buthelezi was not properly a member of the royal family – Buthelezi's mother was King Solomon's sister – and that he himself, as the most senior prince, was a natural choice to serve as Zwelithini's senior adviser. In 1971, he reportedly excluded Buthelezi from a proposed royal council, which was envisaged as an advisory body for the king.

However, by 1975, Buthelezi had been installed as Chief Executive Councillor of the new KwaZulu homeland and had founded his powerful Inkatha movement, which dominated politics in KwaZulu; Mcwayizeni acted as the king's representative in the KwaZulu Legislative Assembly but otherwise was increasingly sidelined. In 1979, Buthelezi apparently accused Mcwayizeni and Zwelithini of plotting to form an opposition party in KwaZulu.

=== African National Congress ===
In the 1980s, Mcwayizeni began to build a relationship with the African National Congress (ANC), another large black political movement then exiled to Zambia. After meeting with the ANC's leaders in Harare, Zimbabwe in 1989, Mcwayizeni resigned from the KwaZulu government and publicly declared his support for the ANC, a significant move for a member of the Zulu royal family, given Inkatha's claim to a privileged relationship with the family.

At the ANC's 48th National Conference, held in December 1991 after it had been unbanned by the apartheid government, Mcwayizeni was elected to a three-year term as a member of the ANC's National Executive Committee. In subsequent years, during the ANC–Inkatha political violence of the democratic transition, Mcwayizeni's house was petrol-bombed and his life was otherwise presumed to be under threat. He was also conclusively sidelined from the royal family and did not meet with King Zwelithini again for several years, until mid-1994.

== Parliament: 1994–1999 ==
In the 1994 general election, KwaZulu and the other homelands were incorporated back into the republic and Zulu was elected to represent the ANC in the new National Assembly, the lower house of the new South African Parliament. He served in the seat for a single term, leaving after the June 1999 election.

During his term, he reconciled with King Zwelithini as Zwelithini went through a period of estrangement from Buthelezi; in September 1994, Zwelithini reportedly told Mcwayizeni that he saw him as his rightful "senior adviser", and Mcwayizeni said publicly that, "Buthelezi is now against the king, against the royal family. In fact, the Zulu royal family is now against him". Mcwayizeni said that he would not resign from the ANC or from Parliament as he returned to his royal duties:

I am a politician. But when it comes to matters concerning the royal house, I leave my politics at the door.

Between 1994 and 1999, relations between Inkatha and the ANC improved, which Deputy President Jacob Zuma said was partly due to Mcwayizeni's efforts to broker peace in KwaZulu-Natal. However, Mcwayizeni and Buthelezi reportedly never reconciled before Mcwayizeni's death.

== Personal life ==
He died on 7 September 1999 in Johannesburg. He had kidney problems and high blood pressure and was ill for about two years before his death. He was married to Thoko and had two daughters and five sons.
