= Arthur Harcourt =

South African cricketer, lawyer and judge

Personal information
- Full name: Arthur Bryan Harcourt
- Born: 14 November 1917; Pietermaritzburg, Natal, South Africa
- Died: 12 August 1973 (aged 55); Pietermaritzburg, Natal, South Africa
- Batting: Right-handed
- Role: Wicket-keeper

Domestic team information
- Years: Team
- 1947: Oxford University

Career statistics
Competition	First-class
Matches	4
Runs scored	76
Batting average	12.66
100s/50s	–/–
Top score	25*
Catches/stumpings	4/3
- Source: Cricinfo, 8 July 2020

Arthur Bryan Harcourt QC (14 November 1917 – 12 August 1973) was a South African first-class cricketer and judge.

Harcourt was born at Pietermaritzburg in November 1917. He was educated at St. Charles College, before going up to the University of Natal. He was awarded a Rhodes Scholarship to the University of Oxford in 1940, however this was deferred due to the Second World War, with Harcourt serving in the South African Army and reaching the rank of captain. Following the war, he took up his Rhodes Scholarship at Brasenose College, Oxford, in 1945. While studying at Oxford, he played first-class cricket for Oxford University in 1947, making four appearances. He scored 76 runs in his four matches, with a high score of 25 not out. Harcourt also played rugby union for Oxford University RFC, gaining a blue.

After graduating from Oxford, Harcourt returned to South Africa to pursue a legal career. Among his engagements were his tenure as chairman of the Society of Advocates of Natal from 1958 to 1961, chairman of the General College of The Bar of South Africa in 1961, and as a judge on the Supreme Court of South Africa for the Natal Division from 1966 to 1969. Harcourt died at Pietermaritzburg in August 1973.
