= Ingonyama Trust =

Repository for the communal land of the Zulu Nation

The Ingonyama Trust is a corporate entity that was established by the KwaZulu Legislative Assembly in April 1994, days before South Africa's first democratic elections. The establishment of the Ingonyama Trust resulted from a secret deal between the National Party and the Inkatha Freedom Party that convinced the IFP to set aside its planned boycott of elections. The Ingonyama Trust was founded as a repository for the communal land of the Zulu Nation with His Majesty the King as the sole Trustee. In 1997 the democratic National Parliament of the Republic of South Africa amended this Act, so that it is consistent with modern constitutional order. This amendment involved changes to all sections of the Act by way of the KwaZulu - Natal Ingonyama Trust Amendment Act 9 of 1997. This Act established the Trust Board appointed by the Minister of Agriculture, Land Reform and Rural Development following a consultative process with the KwaZulu-Natal Premier, Executive Council and the KwaZulu - Natal Provincial House of Traditional Leaders. The King remains the sole Trustee and he (or his nominee) chairs the Board.

The Trust Board is tasked with the responsibility of administering the Trust and Trust land for the benefit, material welfare and social well-being of the Zulu nation, who continue to occupy the land as they historically have done. The Trust owns 29.67% of the land in KwaZulu-Natal, which is equivalent to 28,000 square kilometres, or 10,811 square miles.

The Board of the Trust consists of His Majesty the King MisuZulu kaZwelithini who is the chairperson of the Board, and the six members appointed by the Minister of Rural Development and Land Reform are as follows:

- Advocate Linda Zama (vice chairperson)
- Dr Thandi Dlamini
- Ms Nomusa Zulu
- Mr Ntambudzeni Dandy Matamela
- Inkosi Phallang Bokang Molefe
- Inkosi Sibonelo Mkhize
