= Zulu Nation =

Zulu Nation may refer to:

- Zulu people
- Zulu Kingdom, 1816–1897
- Universal Zulu Nation, a hip-hop awareness group
- Zululand (disambiguation)
