= Mnguni =

South African politician

Mnguni was said to be the leader - and earliest named ancestor - of the Nguni nation who reached Southern Africa migrating from the North. Additionally, he was the father of King Xhosa. The Xhosa people, today considered a sub-nation of the Nguni nation, were historically referred to as AbeNguni. Mnguni's name derives from the word Nguni, the name for the major ethnicity in South Africa. It now includes the Zulus, Xhosas, Ndebeles and Swazis among others.

Most of the different Nguni-tribes trace their lineage to Mnguni, the King of the unified (pre-Zulu, pre-Xhosa, pre-Ndebele, pre-Swazi etc.) Nguni nation in South Africa. Xhosa kings trace their lineage to Mnguni, as the founder of the Xhosa Kingdom was his heir Xhosa.
