= Great Wife =

African honorific

Great Wife or Senior Wife is an honorific applied to the principal female spouse in African polygynous unions. It is widely used by contemporary royal and aristocratic wives in states throughout the modern continent as a synonym for consort (e.g., Mantfombi Dlamini of eSwatini, who once served as the chief consort of a Zulu King, bore it as a title).

== Historic background and terms ==
In ancient Egypt, the pharaoh's principal consort was known as the great royal wife. She presided over her husband's harem and served a variety of priestly functions in the kingdom. A great royal wife was also known as a good wife.

Good wives were the head mistress of the home they were married into, and effectively served as the heads of the harems of the houses in question. Throughout history, the term harem has been less defined in comparison to the definitions used in modern periods. In Islamic civilizations, a 'Harem' was defined as an area of privacy and seclusion for the women of the household - irrespective of whether they were spouses or not.

In Kush and other African states of the pre-colonial period, the chief royal consorts often functioned in much the same fashion.

== Roles in history ==
One of the most popularly known Great Wives in the ancient world was Nefertari, who was married to Pharaoh Ramesses II, which in royal status made her the second most powerful figure in the kingdom he ruled. The queen or the mistress of the king often had a supporting role - though in practice these women have had substantial influence over the affairs of the kingdoms their principals ruled throughout history.

The Great Wife had many roles, but a mainly known one was to watch over the king's harem which was where the wives were housed but, in some kingdoms, also where those women and minor children that were otherwise closely related to him stayed. Nefertari is a fine example of a great royal wife; she was greatly influential in the administration of Egypt, took part in court ritual, and made significant contributions to Egyptian culture as a diplomat. She played a crucial behind the scenes role in the royal family, and that reflected on the perception of the role that a Great Wife is now believed to have. Both during her life and following her death, several monuments to her memory were erected by Ramesses II as a further marker of her eminence.

== Today ==
The practice of creating great wives, with the most senior polygynous spouses of contemporary African royals and aristocrats often being referred to as their Great Wives, has continued to the present. In addition to the queen of the Zulus, contemporary holders of the title have included the numerous bearers of the Olori Agba attribute of Yorubaland and the principal consort of the Ingwenyama of eSwatini.

When regarded as more of a generic term for a principal spouse in a polygynous household, traditions pertaining to great wives vary; In Nigerian customary law, a subordinate wife disrespecting her superior in his household has been used as a grounds for the husband divorcing her, while in Southern African customary law, the recognized superior is the one through whom inheritance is reckoned.

=== List ===
| Dynasty | Name | Husband | Comments |
|---|---|---|---|
| House of Dlamini | LaMatsebula | Mswati III | Queen of eSwatini (1986 - present) |
| House of Zulu | Mantfombi Dlamini | Goodwill Zwelithini | Queen of the Zulus (1977 - 2021) |
| House of Oranyan | Abibat Adeyemi | Lamidi Adeyemi III | Queen of Oyo (1970 - 2022) |

== See also ==
- Queen mothers in Africa
- Great Royal Wife
