= Dinuzulu's Volunteers =

Dinuzulu's Volunteers (1884) were a militant group of farmers that fought for Dinuzulu kaCetshwayo, the king of the Zulu nation, led by Louis Botha.

== Cause of unrest ==
After the Anglo-Zulu War, Britain divided Zululand up into 13 'chiefdoms', governed over by compliant chiefs. This did not last for long, however, and eventually the rightful heir Dinuzulu, son of the former king Cetshwayo kaMpande was reinstated.

However, one chief, Zibhebhu kaMaphitha (also known as Usibepu), was left alone and allowed to keep his land.

== Formation of Dinuzulu's Volunteers ==
Dinuzulu appealed to the British against this decision, but received no response, which led to the Boers from Utrecht and Vryheid being called into Dinuzulu's Volunteers in return for land.

They fought several battles against the Zulu chief Zibhebhu until their eventual victory on 5 June 1884, at the Battle of Ghost Mountain. Zibhebhu, however, escaped, by climbing up the mountain with a white trader.
