= Mantfombi Dlamini =

Queen consort and queen regent of the Zulu Nation

Queen regent of the Zulus
- Regency: 24 March 2021 – 29 April 2021
- Predecessor: Goodwill Zwelithini (as king)
- Successor: Misuzulu Zulu (as king)

Queen consort of the Zulus
- Tenure: 1977 – 12 March 2021
- Born: 15 February 1953; Swaziland Protectorate
- Died: 29 April 2021 (aged 68); Johannesburg, Gauteng, South Africa
- Spouse: Goodwill Zwelithini
- Issue: King Misuzulu Zulu; Princess Ntandoyesizwe Sobethu; Princess Nomkhosi Magogo; Princess Bukhosibemvelo; Prince Bambindlovu Makhosezwe; Prince Lungelo; Prince Mandlesizwe; Prince Simangaye
- House: Dlamini (by birth); Zulu (by marriage)
- Father: Sobhuza II
- Mother: Princess Manoni waKlebe

Shiyiwe Mantfombi Dlamini Zulu (15 February 1953 – 29 April 2021) was the queen consort of the Zulu nation from 1977 to 2021 as the Great Wife to King Goodwill Zwelithini. She served as the queen regent from March 2021 to April 2021.

== Early life and family ==
Queen Mantfombi Dlamini was born on 15 February 1953 to the House of Dlamini. Born to King Sobhuza II of Swaziland and Princess Manoni, who was herself the granddaughter of King Mbandzeni, a former Swati king, Mantfombi's father Sobhuza II, as Ngwenyama of the Swazi Nation, became the King of Swaziland at independence in 1968. Queen Mantfombi's brother, Sobhuza's successor Mswati III, would ultimately change their country's name to Eswatini in 2018.

Her family forged links with other African dynasties: her brother, Prince Thumbumuzi Dlamini, married into the Mandela chieftaincy family of Mvezo in the same year as her betrothal. Through this union, she gained Zenani Mandela-Dlamini as a sister-in-law.

The Queen was a member of the Seventh-day Adventist Church.

== Queen consort ==
After a traditional upbringing in the Swazi royal family, the princess was betrothed to King Goodwill Zwelithini of the Zulu Nation in 1973. At the time of their betrothal, she was a member of the royal family of a sovereign state. Her intended husband was a chief recognised by the South African government as the traditional authority of Zululand. Considering their relative dynastic seniority, the Swazi palace laid a condition for the marriage: the princess was to become the King's Great Wife, a position that would give her male children first place in the line of succession. The Zulu agreed, and the couple married in 1977.

== Queen regent ==
She was appointed as the interim leader of the Zulu Nation under the title of queen regent, on 24 March 2021, after the death of His Majesty King Goodwill Zwelithini on 12 March 2021. This was in accordance with King Zwelithini's will, and she was set to temporarily serve in this capacity until the next Zulu king was appointed. Had she survived, she would also have appointed the next king; her first son, Misuzulu Zulu, was believed to have been her choice, which materialised.

On 27 April 2021, the royal family confirmed that Queen Mantfombi Dlamini had been hospitalized. She stayed at the hospital until the time came. She died two days later on 29 April 2021. The family did not immediately release the details of the cause of death.

Prince Mangosuthu Buthelezi described her death as "unexpected". KwaZulu-Natal Premier Sihle Zikalala called the news "heart-wrenching" and said the Queen was a bridge between the Zulu and eSwatini nations. He called her leadership role an inspiration for women, which helped to "administer the final burial rites to the backward, patriarchal and chauvinistic tendencies that considered women as inferior beings".

On the following day, Prince Buthelezi confirmed that the Queen died around 20:15 at the Netcare Milpark Hospital in Johannesburg. He further announced that the Queen had been suffering from a long-term illness; this was known to the palace but not revealed publicly. After recovering from COVID-19, she was admitted to a hospital in Durban for a previously scheduled operation to remove gallstones. As she was too weak to undergo surgery, she saw another doctor in Johannesburg, and was later hospitalized.

== Children ==
Queen Mantfombi and King Goodwill had eight children. They are as follows:

Name	Birth	Death	Spouse and children
King Misuzulu Zulu	23 September 1974		Married May 2021, Ntokozo Mayisela; 2 sons
King Misuzulu Zulu	23 September 1974		Married March 2022, Nozizwe Mulela; no issue
King Misuzulu Zulu	23 September 1974		Married November 2025, Nomzamo Myeni; no issue
King Misuzulu Zulu	23 September 1974		Married July 2026, Princess Sihle Mdluli of Mawewe; no issue
Princess Ntandoyesizwe Zulu	28 June 1976		Married April 2002–2007, Kgosi Oupa Moilwa (–2010); no issue
Princess Ntandoyesizwe Zulu	28 June 1976		Married Moses Tembe; 2 children
Princess Nomkhosi Magogo Zulu	23 July 1978		Married 2024, Melusi Moyo
Princess Bukhosibemvelo Zibuyile Zulu	3 February 1980		Married August 2009, Sipho Nyawo (1960–2021);
Prince Bambindlovu Makhosezwe Zulu	12 April 1981		Married October 2025, Precious Vilakati
Prince Lungelo Zulu	9 January 1984		
Prince Mandlesizwe Zulu	26 March 1990		
Prince Simangaye Zulu	16 May 1991		

== See also ==
- Monarchies in Africa
- Zulu Kingdom
- Zulu royal family
- KwaZulu-Natal

Regnal titles
Preceded by Goodwill Zwelithini	Queen regent of the Zulu nation 24 March 2021 – 29 April 2021	Succeeded by Misuzulu Zulu
