= St. Charles College, Pietermaritzburg =

Coordinates: 29°36′30″S 30°24′31″E

St Charles College

Location
- Harwin Road, Scottville; Pietermaritzburg, KwaZulu-Natal; South Africa

Information
- Type: Private, Day and Boarding
- Motto: Fideli certa merces – To the faithful one, a certain reward
- Religious affiliation: non-denominational Christian
- Established: 26 July 1875; 151 years ago
- Sister school: St. John's Diocesan School for Girls
- School district: District 9
- School number: 033 386 8235
- College Principal: Mr Allen van Blerk
- Curriculum: Cambridge International Examinations in the Senior School and Singapore Mathematics and Science in the Preparatory School.
- Grades: 000–12
- Gender: Male
- Age: 3 to 19
- Enrollment: 900 boys
- Language: English
- Schedule: 07:00 – 17:00
- Campus: Urban Campus
- Campus type: Suburban
- Houses: Conway; Delalle; O'Meara; Smith
- Colours: Blue; Gold; White
- Song: Together Standing Tall
- Rival: Durban High School; Maritzburg College
- Affiliations: ISASA
- Website: www.stcharlescollege.co.za

St Charles College, founded in 1875, is a Christian, independent boys college situated in Pietermaritzburg, South Africa, catering for day boys from Grade 000 to Matric, with boarders from Grade 4 upwards.

== History ==
St Charles Grammar School for Boys was established on 26 July 1875 by Bishop Charles Jolivet of the Order of Mary Immaculate (OMI), in Loop Street, Pietermaritzburg. The school was later sold to the Marist Brothers in 1912 who renamed it St Charles College. Growth was so substantial that 14 years later it was necessary to move the college out of its cramped buildings in the city to the suburb of Scottsville, also in Pietermaritzburg. Undergoing rapid expansion, particularly in the 1950s, the future of St Charles was seemingly assured until, with declining interest in vocations in the Catholic Church, the college almost closed its doors in 1978. It was saved by the eleventh-hour intervention of a small group of Old Boys who worked to re-establish the college, resulting in a non-denominational school with a secular Headmaster.

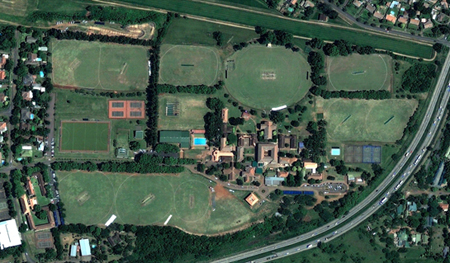
An Aerial view of the college in early 2011

=== Significant dates ===
- 1875 – 26 July – St Charles Grammar School (SCGS) for Boys founded by Bishop Charles Constant Jolivet, Catholic Bishop of Natal, at Allard House, Loop Street
- 1877 – SCGS moves across Loop Street to Bishop Jolivet's Episcopal Palace
- 1883 – SCGS moves to St Mary's Parish Hall, Longmarket Street
- 1901 – SCGS moves next door to St Charles School buildings, Longmarket Street
- 1913 – St Charles School bought by the Marist Brothers – buildings re-vamped and enlarged for the whole of 1913 – no teaching takes place
- 1914 – January – St Charles School, renamed St Charles College, re-opens for classes
- 1925 – January – St Charles College moves to new buildings in Harwin Road, Scottsville. Old school buildings become the Ansonia Hotel
- 1973 – 18 September – Board of Governors formed to assist Marist Brothers in the management of the School
- 1979 – 1 January – first non-Brother Headmaster, Mr Wynne Bowden. St Charles now non-denominational, Christian school. From Class 1 to Matric, 136 boys form St Charles College
- 1991 – O'Meara House disbanded
- 2012 – 800 boys in the school, of which 190 are boarders.
- 2012 – O'Meara House reinstated

== Academics ==
=== Cambridge International Examinations ===
St Charles College offers Cambridge International Examinations (CIE) in the senior school. In 2002, Previous headmaster Ronnie Kuhn, implemented CIE Examinations into the school system and 2012 marked the tenth anniversary that St. Charles College has benefited from using CIE. Students in grade 10, write IGCSE and students in grade 11 and 12 write AS and A Levels, the GCE Advanced Level.

=== Subjects offered ===
- Accounting
- Afrikaans
- Art and Design
- Biology
- Business Studies
- Chemistry
- Computer Science
- Design and Technology
- Economics
- English Literature
- French
- Geography
- History
- isiZulu
- Mathematics
- Further Mathematics
- Music
- Physics
- Physical education

== Sports ==
=== Facilities ===
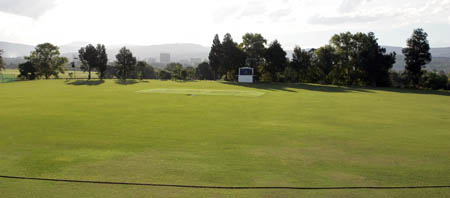
SCC boasts one of the largest Cricket Ovals in Pietermaritzburg

The school is situated on 35ha of land in Scottsville Pietermaritzburg. St Charles College provides a large variety of sports.

=== Basketball ===
St. Charles College is one of the South Africas' top basketball playing schools, being consistently ranked in the top 10. A number of its pupils have represented Kwazulu-Natal & South Africa over the years in various age groups, including the senior national team.

The school in its basketball playing history, has also produced highly successful coach Stewart Bradford, also a former pupil and Head boy of the school who once went on to become a national team selector. St. Charles basketball owed much of its earlier years success to his leadership as 1st team coach, which included coaching the school to a national basketball championship title win in 1998.

The school enjoys rivalries with South Africas' top basketball playing school, Durban High School and a much bigger rivalry with fellow Pietermaritzburg high school basketball powerhouse Maritzburg College.

Facilities include:

- 11 fields used for Cricket, Rugby, Football and Hockey
- 1 High Performance Gym and Conditioning centre
- 1 Indoor Basketball Centre
- 4 Outdoor Basketball courts
- 1 Provincial size cricket oval
- 3 Indoor Cricket Nets
- 20 Outdoor Cricket Nets
- 6 Tennis courts
- 1 Artificial hockey surface
- 2 Squash courts
- 2 Swimming Pools
- Aqua park (world class pool)

=== Sports offered ===
St. Charles College has been performing very well on sports during the year.

- Athletics
- Basketball
- Cricket
- Cross country running
- Golf
- Field hockey
- Rugby
- Rugby sevens
- Soccer
- Squash
- Swimming
- Tennis
- Waterpolo
- Mountain biking

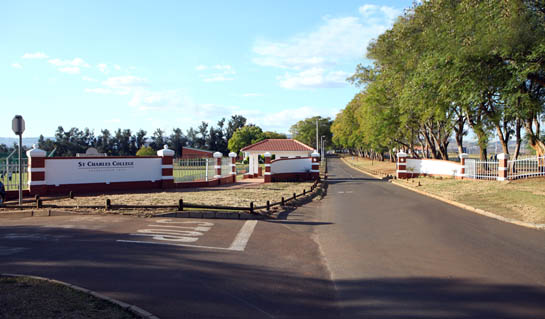
Entrance to St. Charles College on Harwin Road

== Notable Alumnae ==
- Denis Hurley (bishop) - Roman Catholic Vicar Apostolic of Natal and Bishop, Archbishop of Durban
- Pierre de Charmoy – Singer & songwriter
- Mike Antelme - South Africa national rugby team (Springboks) player
- King Misuzulu kaZwelithini – reigning King of the Zulu nation
- Arthur Harcourt – Cricketer and judge
- Sarel Erwee -South Africa national cricket team player
- Graeme Beghin – Cricketer
- Wesley Madhevere – Zimbabwe national cricket team player
- Matthew Sates – Olympic Swimmer
- Patrick Devilliers - Rugby Noceto player
- Edwin Macrae Bath - Member of the Parliament of the Republic of South Africa
- Raphael Ajibade - Junior bulls player
