= KwaZulu =

Bantustan in South Africa (1977–1994)

Coordinates: 28.3167°S 31.4167°E

- 1977–1994
- Top: Flag (1977–1985); Bottom: Flag (1985–1994) Coat of arms
- Motto: "Sonqoba Simunye" (Zulu: Together we shall surmount)
- Location of KwaZulu (red) within South Africa (yellow).
- Status: Bantustan
- Capital: Nongoma (1977–1980); Ulundi (1980–1994)
- Common languages: Zulu; English; Afrikaans
- Government: Constitutional Monarchy
  - King: Goodwill Zwelithini
  - Chief Minister: Mangosuthu Buthelezi
- History
  - Self-government: 1 February 1977
  - Re-integrated into South Africa: 27 April 1994

Area
- 1980: 32,130 km^{2} (12,410 sq mi)

Population
  - 1980: 3,400,000
  - 1991: 5,524,774
- Currency: South African rand
| Preceded by | Succeeded by |
| South Africa | South Africa |

KwaZulu was a semi-independent Bantustan in South Africa, created on 9 June 1970 as Zulu Territorial Authority, intended by the apartheid government as a homeland for the Zulu people. The capital was moved from Nongoma to Ulundi in 1980.

It was led until its abolition in 1994 by Chief Mangosuthu Buthelezi and head of Inkatha, who implemented the limited self-governing powers decided by the South African government as part of apartheid, but rejected the nominal independence which four other homelands accepted, complaining about the fragmented nature of the state, and the inability of the apartheid government to consolidate a viable and contiguous territory for KwaZulu, in the face of stiff resistance from whites. F. W. de Klerk later commented in an interview that he believed that Buthelezi would have accepted independence had his homeland been given the port of Richards Bay, a proposal that failed due to the white population's resistance to the idea.

An attempt to transfer parts of the homeland, along with parts of the Swazi homeland KaNgwane, to the neighbouring country of Swaziland (now Eswatini) in 1982 was never realized. This would have given land-locked Swaziland access to the sea. The deal was negotiated by the governments of South Africa and Swaziland, but was met by popular opposition in the territory meant to be transferred. The territory had been claimed by King Sobhuza of Swaziland as part of the Swazi monarchs' traditional realm, and the South African government hoped to use the homeland as a buffer zone against guerrilla infiltration from Mozambique. South Africa responded to the failure of the transfer by temporarily suspending the autonomy of KaNgwane, then restoring it in December 1982 and granting it nominal self-rule in 1984.

KwaZulu was merged with the surrounding South African province of Natal to form the new province of KwaZulu-Natal.

The name kwaZulu translates roughly as Place of Zulus, or more formally Zululand.

In March 1996, two years after South Africa's transition to majority rule, the trial of The State v. Peter Msane & Others was held due to the accusation against thirteen retired white generals, including Magnus Malan (who served as defence minister at the height of emergency rule in the mid-1980s) and seven Zulus, partisans of Buthelezi's Inkatha Freedom Party of complicity in a massacre of thirteen people, ten years earlier, in a rural village in the KwaZulu homeland known as KwaMakhutha. The trial was an attempt by Nelson Mandela's new government to bring to justice those at the top of apartheid's security forces. They were alleged to have purposefully fanned violence among blacks by arming and training one faction as a proxy force, in the tradition of divide and rule. However, all of the defendants were acquitted.

== Districts in 1991 ==
Districts of the province and population at the 1991 census.

- Ezingolweni: 215,224
- Emzumbe: 217,399
- Vulamehlo: 125,179
- Embumbulu: 271,215
- Umlazi: 299,275
- Hlanganani: 186,712
- Ndwedwe: 318,093
- Vulindlela: 223,706
- Empumalanga: 314,440
- Ntuzuma: 458,529
- Kwa Mapumulu: 231,503
- Ongoye: 175,993
- Inkanyezi: 170,628
- Nkandla: 132,578
- Nqutu: 213,636
- Msinga (main town Tugela Ferry): 154,623
- Emnambithi: 205,639
- Enseleni: 241,005
- Hlabisa: 169,719
- Mahlabatini: 141,284
- Nongoma: 169,153
- Ubombo: 113,409
- Ingwavuma: 144,613
- Simdlangentsha: 120,368
- Madadeni: 313,888
- Okhahlamba: 196,963

== See also ==
- Chief Ministers of KwaZulu
