= Sarel Cilliers =

Voortrekker leader and preacher

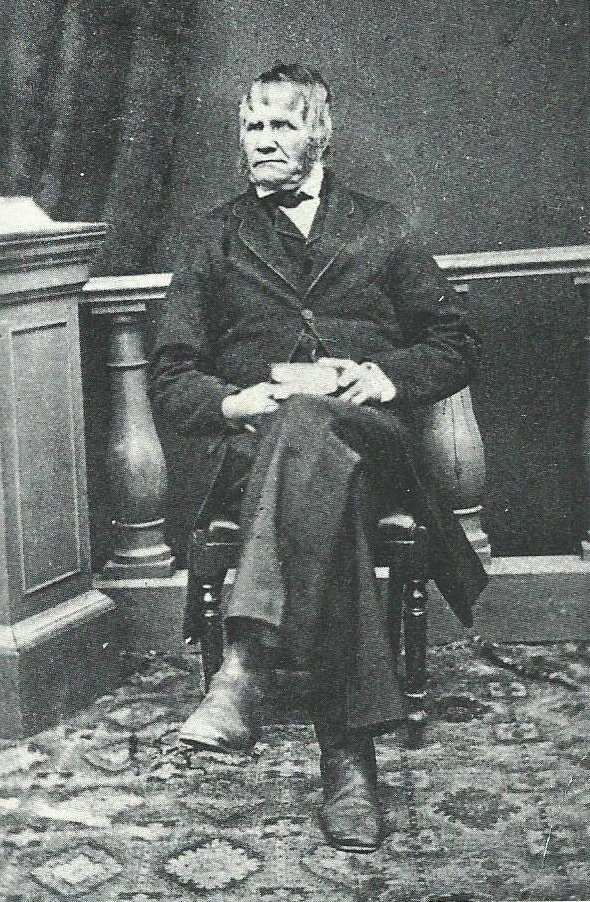

Personal details
- Born: Charl Arnoldus Cilliers; 7 September 1801 Schoongezicht farm, Paarl, Cape Colony
- Died: 4 October 1871 (aged 70) Doornkloof farm, Lindley, Orange Free State
- Resting place: Doornkloof farm 27°43′36″S 27°41′53″E
- Spouses: Anna Francina Viljoen (m. 1823; died 1851) Aletta Elizabeth Loots (m. 1854)
- Parent(s): Carel Cilliers, Elizabeth Catherine Louw
- Occupation: Spiritual leader/Preacher, later a church elder and Councillor

Military service
- Allegiance: Voortrekkers
- Commands: Transvaal and Orange River Commandos
- Battles/wars: Battle of Blood River Vegkop

Charl (Sarel) Arnoldus Cilliers (7 September 1801 – 4 October 1871) was a Voortrekker leader and a preacher. With Andries Pretorius, he led the Boers to a huge victory over the Zulus at the Battle of Blood River in 1838. In particular, Cilliers led the Voortrekkers in a vow which promised that if God would protect them and deliver the enemy into their hands, they would build a church and commemorate the day of their victory as if it were an annual Sabbath day, which their descendants would also be instructed to honour.

He was a prominent member of the Gereformeerde Kerk (Reformed Church), an offshoot of the Dutch Reformed Church. He is described as being a short, stout man, and was believed to have been very religious. He joined the Great Trek at the age of thirty-five.

The town of Kroonstad was, according to folklore, named after a horse belonging to Cilliers, which drowned in a stream (Kroonspruit) where the town is situated.

There is a Sarel Cilliers Museum as well as a statue of him (on the site of the Dutch Reformed Church) in Kroonstad. Numerous streets and roads in Kroonstad and throughout South Africa are named after him.

== Early life ==
Sarel Cilliers was born the fourth of seven children in Schoongezicht, Cape Colony to Carel Cilliers and his wife, Elizabeth Catherine Louw. In 1806 his parents sold Schoongezicht, when Cilliers was five years of age.

From an early age he was well-acquainted with working life on the family farm, as he would often help with pastoral and elementary responsibilities. In his early life, he also developed a strong sense of community and religious duty. On Sundays, the neighbours gathered together to hold services and Holy Communion. It was in his childhood that Cilliers's religious values and aptitude for spiritual leadership were first developed, as he was said to have had a personal encounter with God at age 10. He would often share his faith with other children and encourage them to worship, and strengthen their bond with God.

On 6 October 1823, Cilliers married Anna Francina Viljoen, the daughter of Christopher and Aletta Viljoen Booysen. Cilliers fathered eleven children from his marriage to Anna. On 26 February 1851, Anna died and is buried on the Doornkloofopstal Farm in Doornkloof, Lindley, Orange Free State. Cilliers married his second wife Aletta Elizabeth Loots, the daughter of Pieter Loots and Maria Magdalena Van den Berg, in Winburg, Orange Free State, on 15 May 1854. Cilliers and Aletta had one child together, Pieter Jacobus Willem Cilliers who was born on 3 October 1857.

During his younger years, Cilliers was of a slim build, and it was only later in his life around the time of the Great Trek that he became stouter in appearance.

== The Great Trek ==
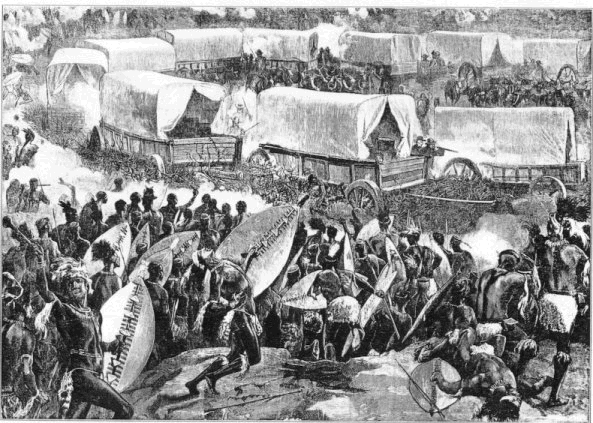
An artist's impression of the Battle of Blood River.

In 1829, the Cilliers family moved to New Hantam (today Colesberg). In 1835, a drought hit the local area, and this led to Cilliers joining the Great Trek with his wife and six children in 1836, as he was convinced that it was God's will that he should go.

Cilliers was made the unofficial pastor of the Great Trek, and he would hold services on a daily basis and give Sunday Communion. During the Great Trek he became distinguished as a spiritual leader, earning him such names as The Prophet of the Great Trek and The Father of Dingaansdag (Dingane's Day). In 1837, he was appointed to one of the two deacons of the first church council elected in the commissioned commandos.

Renowned for his ability of boosting the morale of members of the Great Trek during times of hardship, he would often inspire troops through his recital of the Lord's Prayer during conflict. His skills of fortifying the troops were best displayed at the Battle of Blood River, where he spoke the famous vow to God on the battlefield, and held a thanksgiving service after the decisive victory over the Zulus. Cilliers' vow was celebrated as a national holiday in South Africa (Day of the Vow) on 16 December, until it was renamed as the Day of Remembrance at the onset of democracy in South Africa in 1994.

== Vow ==
No verbatim record of the vow exists. The version often considered to be the original vow is in fact W.E.G. Louw's ca. 1962 translation into Afrikaans of G.B.A. Gerdener's reconstruction of the vow in his 1919 biography of Sarel Cilliers.

The official journal of the emigrant Boers' punitive expedition against Dingane and his Zulus was published in De Zuid-Afrikaan of Friday 14 June 1839.

The following entry for Sunday 9 December 1838 cites the vow as proposed by Andreas Pretorius:

Sondag, 9 Desember 1838 Des anderen daags, zynde de 9e, was alles nog rustig, en wy bleven hier over, om de Sabbath te vieren; terwyl ook de vorige Zaterdag avond, in de tent van de Hoofd-Kommandant, werd doorgebragt met 't zingen van enige gepaste liederen, en 'n kragtig gebed, door de heer Cilliers gedaan.

Aflê van die Gelofte Des Zondags morgens, vóordat de godsdienst begon, liet de Hoofd-Kommandant degenen (Cilliers, Landman en Joubert [see below]) die de godsdienst zouden verrigten, by malkander komen, en verzocht hen, met de gemeente te spreken, dat zy allen volyverig in geest en in waarheid, tot God mogten bidden, om Zyne hulp en bystand, in het slaan tegen de vyand; dat hy aan de Almagtigen 'n gelofte doen wilde, (indien allen wel willen), – "om zo de Heere ons de overwinning geven mogt, 'n Huis tot zyns Grote Naams gedagtenis te stichten alwaar het Hem zal behagen," – en dat zy ook moesten afsmeken, de hulp en bystand van God, om deze gelofte zeker te kunnen volbrengen, en dat wy de dag der overwinning, in 'n boek zullen aantekenen, om dezelve bekend te maken, zelfs aan onze laatste nageslachten, opdat het ter Eere van God gevierd mag worden.

[The three morning services were led by three men:]

De heeren Cilliers, Landman en Joubert, waren opgeruimd in het gemoed, om zulks te horen; zy onderhielden hunne gemeentens hierover en verkregen hunne algemene toestemming.

Toen hierna de godsdienst onderscheidelik begon, nam de heer Cilliers dezelve in de tent van de Hoofd-Kommandant waar. Hy begon met het (laten) zingen uit Psalm 38 vers 12, 16, deed vervolgens het voorgebed, en sprak over de eerste 24 verzen van het 6e Kapittel uit Judicum of de Richteren; besloot vervolgens met het gebed, waarin de belofte voormeld aan God werd gedaan, en 'n krachtige smeking, om Gods hulp en bystand, in het volbrengen derzelve. Er werd weder gezongen, de 12e en 21e verzen van voorm. 38e Psalm, en hy besloot de godsdienst, door het zingen van Psalm 134. Na de middag werd weder 'n byeenkomst gehouden, en men zong verscheidene toepasselike verzen; de heer Cilliers maakte weder 'n aanspraak, en verrigte het openbare gebed; op welke wyze, ook de avond werd doorgebracht.

In English, this literally means:

Sunday, 9 December 1838 The next day, the 9th, everything was still quiet, and we stayed here to celebrate the Sabbath; while also the previous Saturday evening, in the tent of the Commander-in-Chief, was spent with the singing of some appropriate songs, and a powerful prayer, performed by Mr. Cilliers.

Making that vow on Sunday morning, before the commencement of religion, the Chief Commander sent those (Cilliers, Landman and Joubert – see below) who would practice the religion to come to Malkander, and asked them, to speak to the congregation, that all of them mightily persevere in spirit and in truth, praying to God for His help and assistance in striking the enemy; that he wanted to make a vow to the Almighty, (if all would like to), – "so that the Lord may give us the victory, to establish a House of Remembrance of his Great Name, where it will please Him," – and that they also had to plead, the help and assistance of God, to be able to fulfill this vow surely, and that we will record the day of victory, in a book, to make it known, even to our last descendants, that The glory of God may be celebrated.

The three morning services were led by three men:

The Messrs. Cilliers, Landman and Joubert, were delighted to hear such; they maintained their congregations on this and obtained their general consent.

When the religion began, respectively, Mr. Cilliers observed them in the tent of the Commander-in-Chief. He began with the singing of Psalm 38 verses 12, 16, then made the intercession, and spoke of the first 24 verses of the 6th Chapter from Judaism or the Judges; then decided with the prayer in which the promise made to God was made, and a powerful supplication, for God's help and assistance, in accomplishing it. They were sung again, the 12th and 21st verses of form. 38th Psalm, and he decided the religion, by singing Psalm 134. After the afternoon another meeting was held, and several appropriate verses were sung; Mr. Cilliers again made a claim, and performed public prayer; in what way, the evening was also spent

On 14 June 1839 his journal was published as a bilingual leaflet in De Zuid-Afrikaan, Cape Town; Dutch original on one side and the English translation on the other side.

The wording of the Vow is:

Afrikaans:

Hier staan ons voor die Heilige God van hemel en aarde om ŉ gelofte aan Hom te doen, dat, as Hy ons sal beskerm en ons vyand in ons hand sal gee, ons die dag en datum elke jaar as ŉ dankdag soos ŉ Sabbat sal deurbring; en dat ons ŉ huis tot Sy eer sal oprig waar dit Hom behaag, en dat ons ook aan ons kinders sal sê dat hulle met ons daarin moet deel tot nagedagtenis ook vir die opkomende geslagte. Want die eer van Sy naam sal verheerlik word deur die roem en die eer van oorwinning aan Hom te gee.

English:

Here we stand before the holy God of heaven and earth, to make a vow to Him that, if He will protect us and give our enemy into our hand, we shall keep this day and date every year as a day of thanksgiving like a sabbath, and that we shall erect a house to His honour wherever it should please Him, and that we also will tell our children that they should share in that with us in memory for future generations. For the honour of His name will be glorified by giving Him the fame and honour for the victory.

== Later life ==
After the victory at the Battle of Blood River, The Voortrekkers moved to Pietermaritzburg, and Cilliers moved to a farm in Welgevonden (now Colbourne), about 26 kilometres (16 mi) north of Howick in Natal. By selling timber from the trees on his farm he was able to make a good income.

Cilliers served in the Natalia Republic's first House of Assembly. As a member of Council, Cilliers played a large part in the creation of the Covenant Church in Pietermaritzburg in 1839. In 1843, after the British annexation of Natal, Cilliers withdrew from political life, maintaining an important role as an elder of the church.

In 1847, Cilliers sold his farm and moved to the Orange Free State. Here he settled on the farm Doornkloof, in the Lindley district, where he allegedly built his homestead single-handedly. His wife was buried here at the time of her death in 1852. On 15 May 1854, he married Aletta Elizabeth Loots – a thirty-three-year-old widow with whom he had one son.

During the final years of his life, Cilliers was often ill. He died on 4 October 1871, and was buried in the Cilliers family cemetery, in a grave marked by a simple tombstone and later a monument.

== Legacy ==
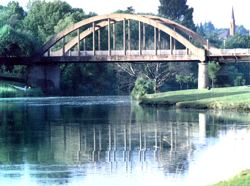
The Sarel Cilliers wagon-wheel bridge in Kroonstad.

As well as numerous public places such as Sarel Cilliers High School, and the Sarel Cilliers wagon-wheel bridge being attached to Cilliers' name, he is also well-remembered by South Africans as a spiritual leader who was thought to have lived in close contact with God, and lived by the principles of his unfaltering faith. Although he is most famously remembered for speaking the Vow at the Battle of the Blood River, he was, in addition, an important progenitor of the early Dutch Reformed Church in South Africa.

He is also seen as an exemplary example of a devout follower of his faith. He believed firmly in his religion with the utmost conviction, as best seen through his Vow. He is remembered as being a constantly determined, principled, and often selfless individual, shown through his ability to endure hardships to serve others in need. Overall he is seen as an important public and cultural figure who played an important role in Voortrekker history, the early history of Natal and the Orange Free State.

== The Cillier name ==
The progenitor of the Cillier name in the region was a French Huguenot refugee named Josué Cellier from Orléans, France who arrived in the Cape of Good Hope in 1700. Other variations of the name include: Celliers, Cilliers, Cillié and Sellier.

== Literary accounts ==
G.B.A. Gerdener wrote a biography of Sarel Cilliers in 1919, which includes details of various events in his life and a reconstruction of the Vow.

== See also ==
- Battle of Blood River
- Boer
- Covenant Monument
- Day of the Vow
- Great Trek
- Voortrekker Monument
- Voortrekker

== Gallery ==
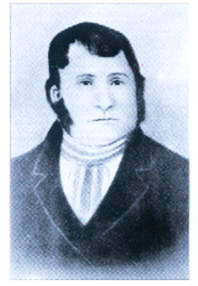
An alternative portrait of Sarel Cilliers, artist unknown.

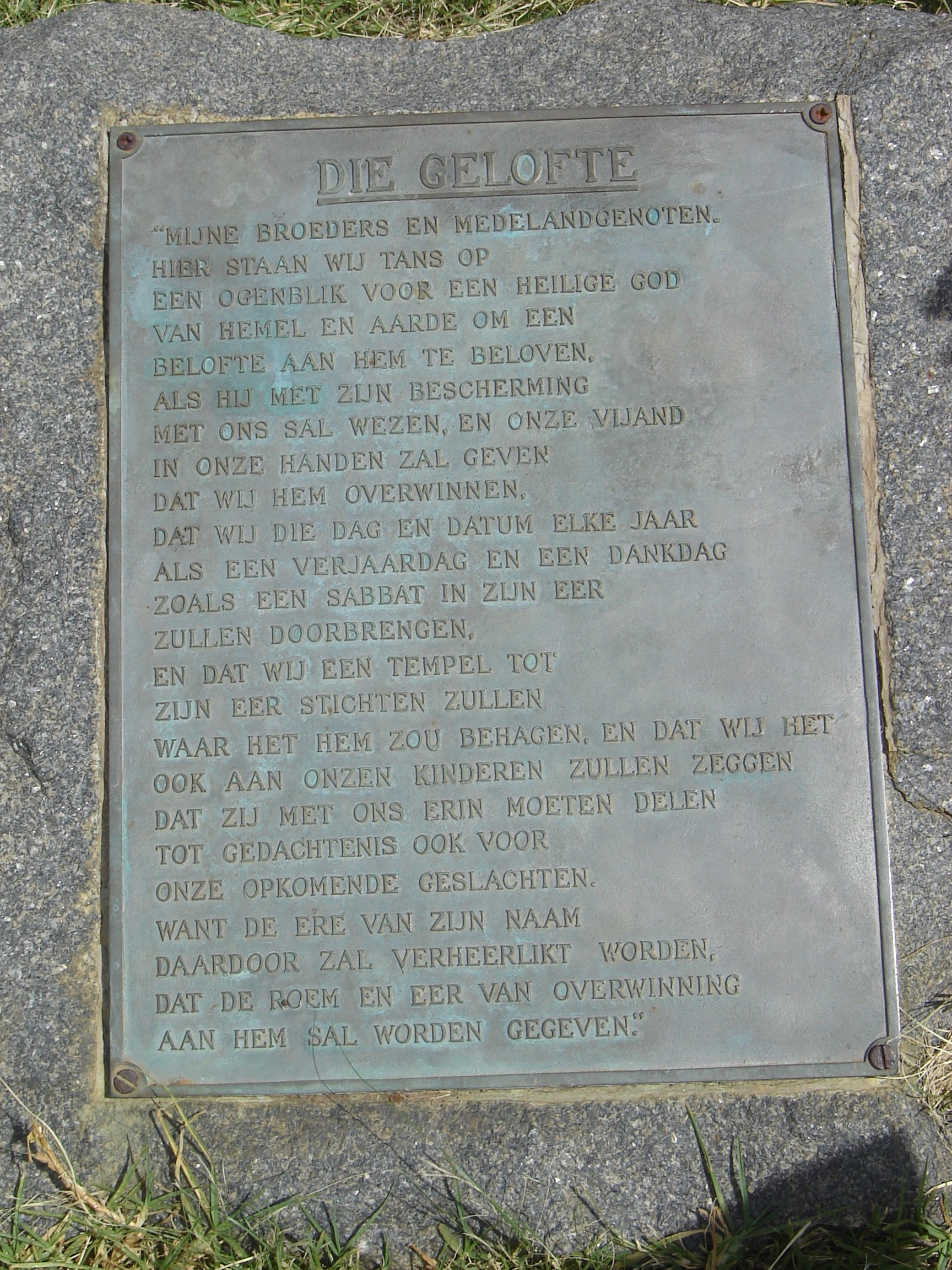
A plaque with die Gelofte – the Vow – inscribed upon it.

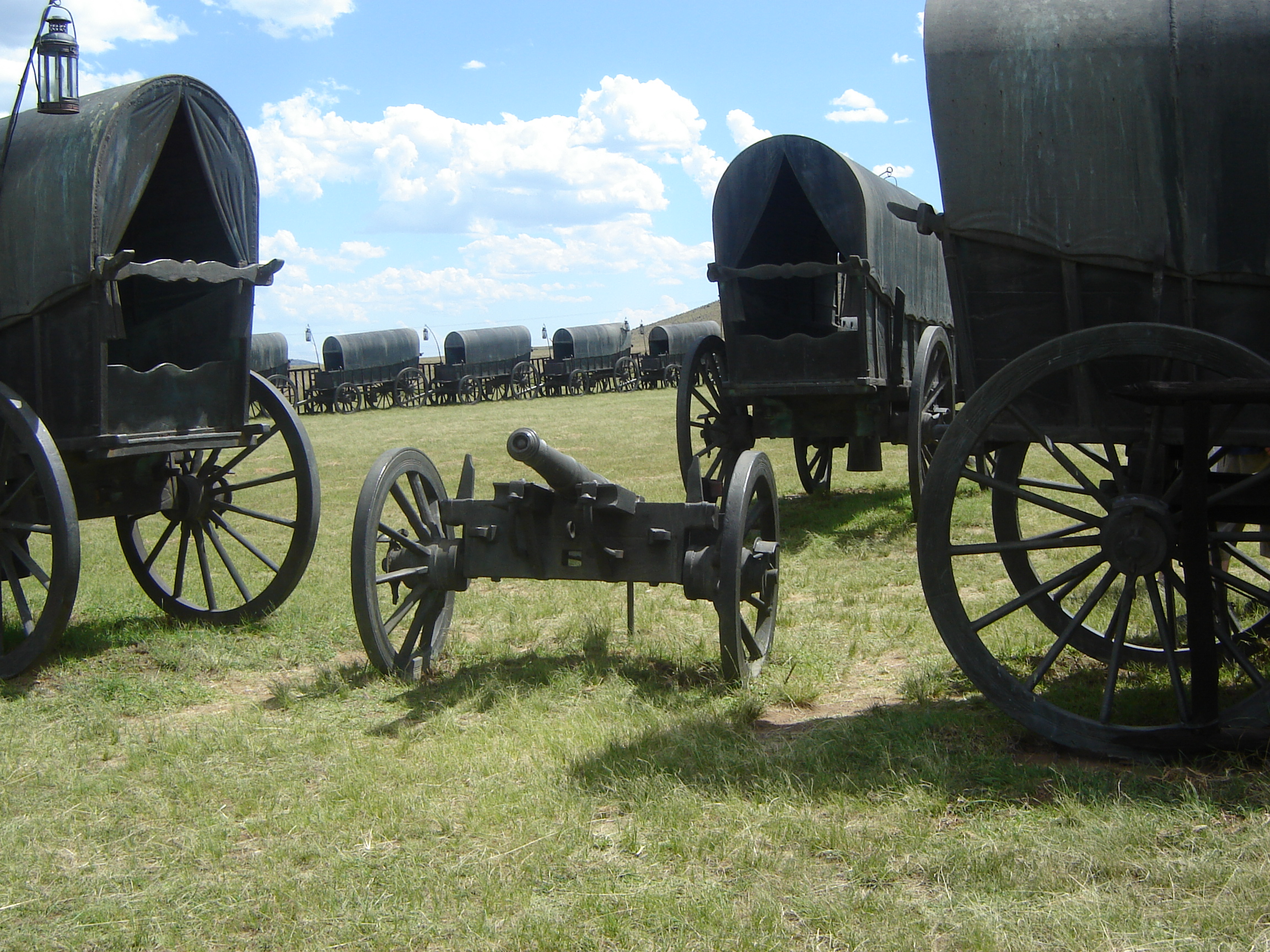
Laager at the Blood River Memorial.
