= Ndlela kaSompisi =

Zulu general (d. 1840)

- Died: February 1840
- Cause of death: Execution by strangulation
- Allegiance: King Shaka; King Dingane
- Conflicts: Ndwandwe–Zulu War; Battle of Blood River; Battle of Maqongqo

Ndlela kaSompisi (died February 1840) was a key general to Zulu Kings Shaka and Dingane. He rose to prominence as a highly effective warrior under Shaka. Dingane appointed him as his inDuna, or chief advisor. He was also the principal commander of Dingane's armies. However, Ndlela's failure to defeat the Boers under Andries Pretorius and a rebellion against Dingane led to his execution. This made him a failure in the eyes of his people.

== Career ==
According to E. A. Ritter, Ndlela was a "Ntuli cannibal recruit" to Shaka's army. His name means "road" or "path". During the Ndwandwe–Zulu War, Ndela distinguished himself by his fighting ability, performing "incredible deeds of destruction" on Shaka's enemies. He was severely wounded in battle with the Ndwandwe. Despite his non-Zulu origins, he was rapidly promoted and was appointed chief of the Ntuli. When his practice of promoting non-Zulus was questioned, Shaka is said to have replied, "Any man who joins the Zulu Army becomes a Zulu. Thereafter his promotion is purely a question of merit, irrespective of the road (ndlela) he came by", referring to the most famous of his adopted soldiers.

After Dingane assassinated and succeeded Shaka, he remained the highest ranking political and military officer in Dingane’s regime. With Dingane’s volatility and thirst for blood, Ndlela proved he was a shrewd operator by maintaining these highly influential positions in a changing regime where Dingane was quick to order an execution of his perceived enemies. A defender of traditional Zulu culture, Ndlela strongly objected when Dingane allowed Francis Owen of London's Anglican Church Missionary Society to set up a mission at the Zulu capital, uMgungundlovu.

He served as Dingane's inDunankulu (chief adviser), Ndunankulu (Prime Minister) and uMkhuzi wamaButho kaZulu (Commander-In-Chief of the Zulu Army). He led a campaign against the Northern Ndebele in 1837, but the war was inconclusive. He allegedly persuaded Dingane to kill Piet Retief and crush the Boers.

He was general of Dingane's forces at the Battle of Blood River (16 December 1838) with Dambuza Nzobo, a significant defeat for the Zulus as the spears and large numbers of Zulus were unable to breach the Boer laager of Andries Pretorius defended with muskets.

Neither Shaka nor Dingane had children. Mindful of the lineage of the Zulu kings, Ndlela repeatedly defied Dingane's request that he assassinate Mpande, half-brother of Shaka and Dingane as he was a threat to Dingane's power. He argued that it would diminish his greatness and that, in any case, Mpande did not aspire to the throne. The Battle of Maqongqo where the forces of Mpande and Dingane clashed in 1840 culminated in Dingane calling Ndlela a traitor. A significant portion of Ndlela's army deserted to Mpande's general Nongalaza. Ndlela withdrew his remaining force rather than be overwhelmed. This resulted in a great loss for Dingane against his brother Mpande who had co-opted the Boers to fight on his side. Dingane ordered Ndlela's death through slow strangulation by cowhide thong.

== Mpande and after ==
Ndlela's inaction against Mpande preserved the blood line of the Zulu monarchy. Mpande, the king after Dingane, was married to Ndlela's daughter Msukilethe. Mpande's son Cetshwayo in turn succeeded him. All subsequent Zulu monarchs are descended from Mpande.

== Monument ==
In 2004, a monument to Ndlela kaSompisi was unveiled in KwaZulu Natal, attended by Jacob Zuma.

== See also ==
- Dingane
- List of Zulu kings
- Mpande
- Senzangakona
- Shaka
