= Natalia Republic =

1839 - 1843 country in Southern Africa

- 1839–1843
- Flag

- Capital: Pietermaritzburg
- Common languages: Dutch; Zulu; English
- Religion: Dutch Reformed
- Government: Boer Republic
- Prime Minister
  - 1839–1843: Andries Pretorius
- Legislature: Volksraad
- Historical era: The Great Trek
  - Established: 12 October 1839
  - Battle of Blood River: 16 December 1838
  - Alliance with Zulu: January 1840
  - Annexed by Britain: 12 May 1843
Preceded by	Succeeded by
Zulu Kingdom	Colony of Natal
- Today part of: South Africa

The Natalia Republic was a short-lived Boer republic founded in 1839 after a Voortrekker victory against the Zulus at the Battle of Blood River. The area was previously named Natália by Portuguese sailors, due to its discovery on Christmas ("Natal" is the Portuguese word for Christmas). The republic came to an end in 1843 when British forces annexed it to form the Colony of Natal. After the British annexation of the Natalia Republic, most local Voortrekkers trekked northwest into Transorangia, later known as the Orange Free State, and the South African Republic.

== History ==
=== European settlement and setbacks ===
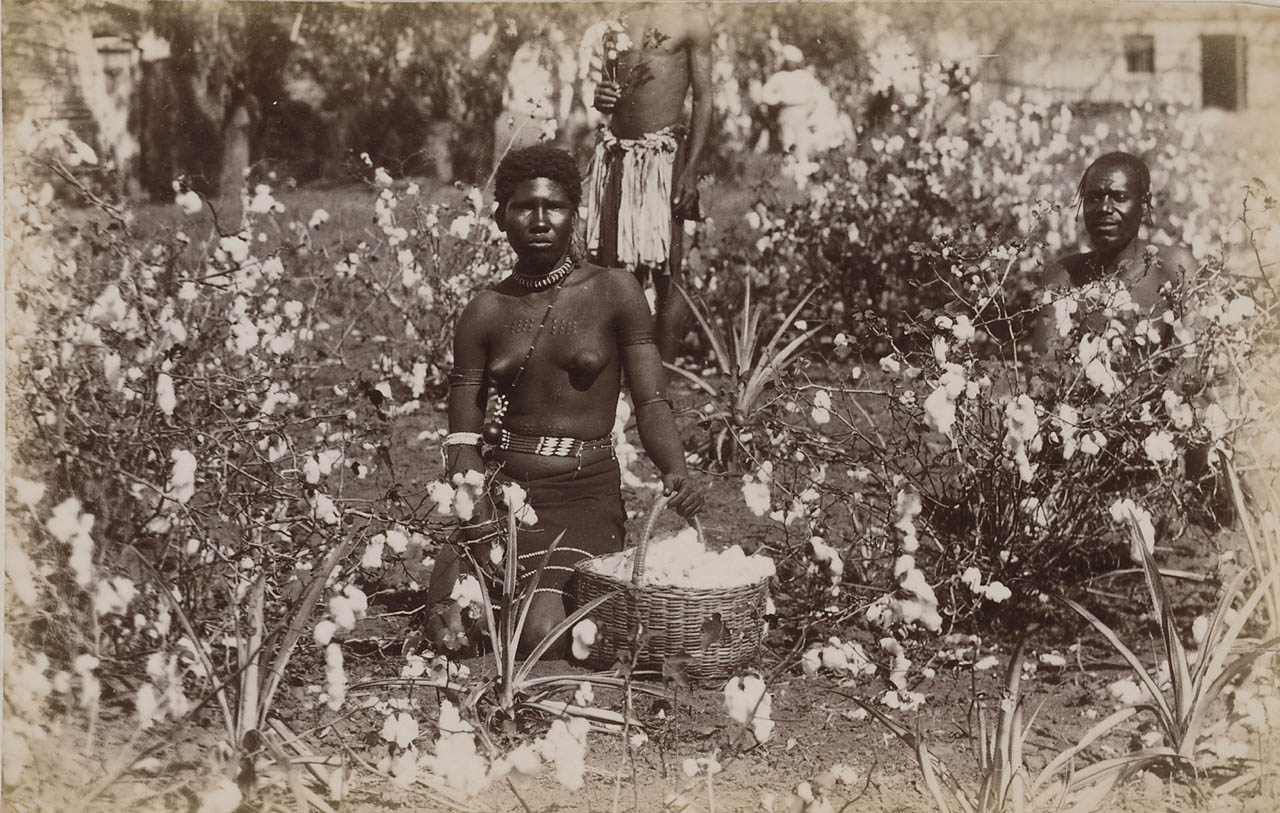
Natal cotton field (c. 1885).

On Christmas Day 1497, Vasco da Gama sailed past the region now known as Transkei and named the country Terra Natalis. He next sighted the bluff at the entrance to what is now the harbour of Durban. Da Gama made no landing here, but in later years the name Natália became associated with the area. Like the rest of South Africa, Natal was neglected by the Portuguese, whose nearest settlement was at Delagoa Bay.

At some unknown date, the amaZulu clan of Nguni people settled in the region north of the Tugela River. Under chief Shaka, the clan became the Zulu Kingdom, and between 1818 and 1820 overran the area. Shaka was succeeded in 1828 by Dingane. British traders established a small settlement at Port Natal, so founding what became the town of Durban, established in 1835.

The next Europeans to settle in the country were emigrant Boers from the Cape Colony, who came by land over the passes of the Drakensberg. These Voortrekkers were led by Piet Retief. Passing through the almost deserted upper regions, Retief arrived at Port Natal in October 1837. During this journey, he chose a site for the capital of the future state that he envisioned. Retief met with Dingane to obtain a grant of land for Boer settlement. Dingane consented on condition that the Boers recover cattle stolen by another chief. Retief managed that, and with the help of Rev. Francis Owen,a missionary living at Dingane’s kraal, drew up a deed of cession in English. Dingane and Retief signed it on 4 February 1838.

Two days later, Dingane ordered the execution of Retief and all of his party, 66 whites and 34 Khoikhoi servants. The Zulu king commanded his impis to kill all the Boers who had entered Natal. The Zulu forces crossed the Tugela River the same day, and massacred the most advanced parties of Boers, many near the future site of the town of Weenen; its name (meaning wailing or weeping) commemorates the event. In one week after the murder of Retief, the Zulus had killed 600 Boers. Other Boers hastily laagered and repulsed Zulu attacks. The Zulus suffered serious loss at a fight near Bushman River.

Hearing of the attack on the Boers, the British settlers at Port Natal sent a force to help them. Robert Biggar led 20 British and 700 friendly Zulus across the Tugela River near its mouth. On 17 April, in a desperate fight with a Zulu force, Biggar's force was overwhelmed. Only four Europeans escaped to Port Natal. The pursuing Zulus attacked the settlement, and the surviving inhabitants took refuge on a ship then in harbour. After the Zulus retired, fewer than a dozen Britons returned to Port Natal; the missionaries, hunters, and other traders returned to Cape Colony.

The Boers had repelled the Zulu attacks on their laagers. Additional Boers arrived from the Drakensberg, and about 400 men under Hendrik Potgieter and Piet Uys advanced to attack Dingane. On 11 April, they fell into a trap and with difficulty cut their way out. Among those slain were Piet Uys and his son Dirk, aged 15.

=== Battle of Blood River ===
Toward the end of the year, the Boers received reinforcements. In December 460 men set out under Boer general Andries Pretorius to take on the Zulus. Andries Pretorius selected Jan Gerritze Bantjes (1817-1887) as his scribe and secretary in recording events of the campaign and coming retaliation battle with the Zulus. Bantjes documented daily in his journal the progress of the commando, from their start on 27 November 1838 until they reached their selected battle site on 15 December 1838. They avoided being led into a trap as happened on the previous attempt to attack the Zulus in April which ended in disaster. On the journey, they had small skirmishes with various kraals but the main Zulu army had not arrived yet to attack. Boer and Zulu scouts were constantly monitoring each other's whereabouts. On 9 December 1838 as Bantjes wrote in his journal, the Boers congregated under a clear sky to sing appropriate psalms and celebrate the Sabbath, taking a vow which became known as the "Day of The Vow or Covenant" that "if the Lord might give us victory, we hereby deem to found a house as a memorial of his Great Name at a place where it shall please Him", and that they also implore the help and assistance of God in accomplishing this Vow and that they write down this Day of Victory in a book and disclose this event to our very last posterities in order that this will forever be celebrated in the honour of God."

On 16 December 1838, while laagered near the Umslatos River or Hippo Pool, they were attacked by more than 10,000 Zulus. As Bantjes wrote in his journal:

Sunday, December 16 was like being newly born for us - the sky was clear, the weather fine and bright. We hardly saw the twilight of the break of day or the guards, who were still at their posts and could just make out the distant Zulus approaching. All the patrols were called back into the laager by firing alarm signals from the cannons. The enemy came forward at full speed and suddenly they had encircled the area around the laager. As it got lighter, so we could see them approaching over their predecessors who had already been shot back. Their rapid approach (though terrifying to witness due to their great numbers) was an impressive sight. The Zulus came in regiments, each captain with his men behind (as the patrols had seen them coming the day before) until they had surrounded us. I could not count them, but I was told that a captive Zulu gave the number at thirty-six regiments, each regiment calculated to be "nine hundred to a thousand men strong.

The battle now began and the cannons unleashed from each gate, such that the battle was fierce and noisy, even the discharging of small arms fire from our marksmen on all sides was like thunder. After more than two hours of fierce battle, the Commander in Chief gave orders that the gates be opened and mounted men sent to fight the enemy in fast attacks, as the enemy near constantly stormed the laager time and again, and he feared the ammunition would soon run out.

The Boers fought off the Zulu. After three hours, the Boers had killed thousands of Zulus and had fewer than a dozen of their men wounded. The Zulus withdrew in defeat, many crossing the river which had turned red with blood and thereafter known as the Battle of Blood River. Modern-day Boers still celebrate the Day of the Vow every year on 16 December.

=== British at Port Natal ===
Returning south, Pretorius and his fighters found that the British had annexed Port Natal (now Durban) on 4 December with a detachment of the 72nd Highlanders from Cape Colony. While the governor of the Cape, Major-General Sir George Napier, had invited the British emigrants from Natal to return to the colony, and stated his intention to take military possession of the port. In sanctioning the occupation of the port the British government of the day had no intention of making Natal a British colony, but wished to prevent the Boers establishing an independent republic upon the coast with a harbour through which access to the interior could be gained. After remaining at the port just over a year the Highlanders were withdrawn, on 24 December 1839.

=== Overthrow of Dingane ===
After the battle, Pretorius took advantage of dissension in the Zulu kingdom to ally himself with Mpande, brother of the Zulu king Dingane. Dingane's attempt to extend his kingdom north to compensate for losses to the Boers had failed. He was defeated by the Swazi people in 1839, leading to discontent with his rule. In exchange for cattle and territory Pretorius agreed to support Mpande's bid to overthrow Dingane. A Boer force supported Mpande's Zulu impi in the invasion. At the Battle of Maqongqo, Dingane was crushed and was put to flight with what retainers chose to follow him into exile. Pretorius took 36,000 head of cattle and proclaimed a large tract of land extending from St Lucia Bay to be part of the Natalia Republic.

== Government of Natalia ==
=== Internal affairs ===
Meantime the Boers had founded Pietermaritzburg, named in honour of leaders Piet Retief and Gerrit Maritz. They made it their capital and the seat of their Volksraad.

Legislative power was vested in the volksraad (consisting of 24 members), while the president and executive were changed every three months. For issues of importance, a meeting was called of het publiek, that is, of all who chose to attend, to sanction or reject it. "The result," says the historian George McCall Theal, "was utter anarchy. Decisions of one day were frequently reversed the next, and every one held himself free to disobey any law that he did not approve of. ... Public opinion of the hour in each section of the community was the only force in the land."

=== Territorial policy ===
The Zulus continued to exist as a distinct and numerous people with their own dispensation within their own territory to the north and east, in the region known as Zululand.

The settlers were in loose alliance with and in quasi-supremacy over the Boer communities that had left the Cape and settled at Winburg and at Potchefstroom. They declared a free and independent state under the title of "The Republic of Port Natal and adjacent countries," and sought (September 1840) from Sir George Napier an acknowledgment of their independence by Great Britain.

Sir George did not give an answer but was friendly to the Boer farmers. He was disturbed when a commando force under Andries Pretorius attacked the Xhosa in December 1840. The national government declined to recognize Natalia's independence but proposed to trade with it if the people would accept a military force to defend against other European powers. Sir George communicated this decision to the volksraad in September 1841.

=== British and Dutch influences ===
The Boers strongly resented the contention of the British that they could not shake off British nationality, though beyond the bounds of any recognized British possession. They also wanted control of the British Natal Port (now renamed Durban). They rejected Napier's overtures.

On 2 December 1841, Napier announced his intention to resume military occupation of Port Natal, citing the Boers' attack on the Xhosa. On 21 February 1842 the settlers responded, with a document written by Jacobus Boshoff. The farmers complained about the lack of representative government, and concluded by a protest against the occupation of any part of their territory by British troops.

Soon after, an event occurred which encouraged the Boers in their opposition to Great Britain. In March 1842 a Dutch vessel sent out by Gregorius Ohrig, an Amsterdam merchant who sympathized with the farmers, reached Port Natal. Johan Arnold Smellekamp concluded a treaty with the volksraad assuring them of the protection of the Netherlands. The Natal Boers believed the Netherlands to be one of the great powers of Europe, and were firmly persuaded that its government would aid them in resisting Great Britain.

== Transfer to colonial government ==
=== Battle of Congella ===
On 1 April 1842 Captain T. C. Smith with a force of 263 men left his camp at the Umgazi, on the eastern frontier of Cape Colony, and marching overland reached Durban without opposition, and encamped, on 4 May, at the base of the Berea hills. The Boers, cut off from their port, called out a commando of some 300 to 400 men under Andries Pretorius and gathered at Congella at the head of the bay. On the night of 23 May, Smith made an unsuccessful attack on the Boer camp, losing his guns and fifty men were killed or wounded. On 26 May the Boers captured the harbour and settlement, and on 31 May blockaded the British camp, the women and children being removed, on the suggestion of Pretorius, to a ship in the harbour of which the Boers had taken possession. Meantime, an old Durban resident, Dick King, had undertaken to convey tidings of the perilous position of the British force to the commandant at Grahamstown. He started on the night of 24 May, and escaping the Boer outposts rode through the dense bush, and in nine days reached his destination—a distance of 360 miles (580 km) in a direct line, and nearly 600 miles (970 km) by the route to be followed. This remarkable ride was accomplished with one change of mount, obtained from a missionary in Pondoland. A comparatively strong force under Colonel A. J. Cloete was at once sent by sea to Port Natal, and on 26 June, Captain Smith was relieved. The besieged had suffered greatly from lack of food. Within a fortnight Colonel Cloete received the submission of the volksraad at Pietermaritzburg. The burghers represented that they were under the protection of the Netherlands, but this plea was peremptorily rejected by the commander of the British forces.

The British government was still undecided as to its policy towards Natal. In April 1842 Lord Stanley, then Secretary of State for War and the Colonies in the second Peel Administration, wrote to Sir George Napier that the establishment of a colony in Natal would be attended with little prospect of advantage, but at the same time stated that the pretensions of the emigrants to be regarded as an independent community could not be admitted. Various measures were proposed which would but have aggravated the situation.

=== Annexation ===
Finally, in deference to the strongly urged views of Sir George Napier, Lord Stanley, in a despatch of 13 December, received in Cape Town on 23 April 1843, consented to Natal becoming a British colony. The institutions adopted were to be as far as possible in accordance with the wishes of the people, but it was a fundamental condition "that there should not be in the eye of the law any distinction or disqualification whatever, founded on mere difference of colour, origin, language or creed."

Sir George then appointed Mr Henry Cloete (a brother of Colonel Josias Cloete) a special commissioner to explain to the Natal volksraad the decision of the government. There was a considerable party of Natal Boers still strongly opposed to the British, and they were reinforced by numerous bands of Boers who came over the Drakensberg from Winburg and Potchefstroom. Commandant Jan Mocke of Winburg (who had helped to besiege Captain Smith at Durban) and others of the "war party" attempted to induce the volksraad not to submit, and a plan was formed to murder Pretorius, Boshoff and other leaders, who were now convinced that the only chance of ending the state of complete anarchy into which the country had fallen was by accepting British sovereignty.

=== Extent of the colony ===
On 8 August 1843 the Natal Volksraad unanimously agreed to the terms proposed by Lord Stanley, setting Drakensberg as the northern limit of Natal. Many of the Boers who would not acknowledge British rule trekked once more over the mountains into what became the Orange Free State and Transvaal provinces. At the end of 1843 there were not more than 500 Dutch families left in Natal.

Cloete, before returning to the Cape, visited Mpande and obtained from him a valuable concession. Hitherto the Tugela River from source to mouth had been the recognized frontier between Natal and Zululand. Mpande gave up to Natal all the territory between the Buffalo and Tugela rivers, which later formed Klip River county.

== Aftermath ==
Proclaimed a British Colony of Natal in 1843, it became a part of Cape Colony in 1844, not being separated again until 1856. The power of the volksraad did not truly end until 1845, when an effective British administration was established under Martin West as lieutenant-governor. After the Anglo-Zulu War of 1879, the British defeated the Zulu army, and annexed Zululand to Natal in 1897. One of the four founding provinces of South Africa, it is now KwaZulu-Natal. This province is still home to the Zulu nation; native speakers of the Zulu language form 77.8% of the population. The province also has a large ethnic Indian population, as well as Boer-descended residents and ethnic British descendants.

== See also ==
- KwaZulu-Natal Province
- South African Republic
- Orange Free State
- Volkstaat
- Boer republics
