= Jan Bantjes =

- Born: Jan Gerritze Bantjes; 8 July 1817; Beaufort West
- Died: 10 March 1887 (aged 69); Potchefstroom
- Spouse: Thysina Germina Knoetze
- Children: Bernard Louise Bantjes (1839-1911), Jan Gerrit Bantjes (1840-1914), Rachel Hilletje Bantjes (Coulson) (1845-1930)
- Parent(s): Bernard Louis Bantjes (1788-1849), Isabella Adriana Swanepoel

Jan Gerritze Bantjes (Beaufort West, 8 July 1817 – Potchefstroom, 10 March 1887) was a Voortrekker whose exploration of the Natal and subsequent report were the catalyst for mobilising the Great Trek. He was also the author of the treaty between the Zulu king Dingane kaSenzangakhona and the Voortrekkers under Andries Pretorius.

== Early life and background ==
Jan Gerritze Bantjes was born on 8 July 1817 in the Nieuveld district of Graaff-Reinet and was baptised at the Dutch Reformed Church in that town on 6 October 1817. He was the third child of Bernard Louis Bantjes (1788-1849), who owned a prosperous trading store and farm, and Isabella Adriana Swanepoel.

== Career ==
In 1834, while he was still studying at the English Albany Freemasons College in Grahamstown, Bantjes was chosen as secretary for the Kommissitrek (“Commission Trek”). The aim of the trek, which was led by Piet Uys, was to explore the region around Port Natal (later Durban) and assess its potential as a new homeland for the Cape Boers disenchanted with British rule. Bantje's "Natal Land Report" (1835), which documented their journey from Grahamstown to Port Natal and portrayed Port Natal as an ideal location, was the catalyst for mobilising the Great Trek. On New Year's Day 1837, Bantjes joined the main Voortrekker assembly under Andries Pretorius at Thaba Nchu.

Bantjes also wrote a disputed land treaty which, in 1838, triggered the massacre by the Zulu King Dingaan of Boer Commander Piet Retief and his 70 strong party at uMgungundlovu. Bantjes then joined the Wenkommando military campaign (Nov.-Dec.1838) against the Zulu King and was Pretorius' secretary-general. The original "Bantjes Journal" of the expedition (now lost, though a verbatim copy exists) records the Battle of Blood River that took place on 16 December 1838, resulting in the defeat of King Dingaan and his 25,000 strong army.

In 1838, Bantjes was one of the founders of Pietermaritzburg and settled there. He served as Clerk to the Natal Parliament, practiced law, and arranged the financing by the local community for the construction of Church of the Vow.

In 1840, Bantjes and his family returned to the Cape Colony. They trekked overland to Beaufort West, where they were remarried due to an administrative error made at Pietermaritzburg. In 1848, he was a teacher and served as clerk of the church council at Fauresmith. He also appears to have run a shop in Prince Albert for some years.

In 1865, the family moved to Pretoria, where he served as a magistrate's clerk and lawyer and later Postmaster General of the South African Republic. He was tutor, mentor and confidant to South Africa's first President Paul Kruger, and also taught Marthinus Wessel Pretorius and two vice presidents.

During the 1870s–80s, Bantjes was a legal prosecutor in Lichtenburg and Ventersdorp. Jan Gerritze Bantjes is the father of Jan Gerrit Bantjes (1841-1914) who discovered the Witwatersrand Gold Reef in Jun.1884.

He died at his eldest son's home at Potchefstroom on 6 October 1887.

== Family ==
Bantjes married Thysina Germina Knoetze in Pietermaritzburg on 23 September 1838. Their first child was Bernard Louise Bantjes (1839-1911) who became a property developer in Johannesburg. Another son, Jan Gerrit Bantjes, discovered the first Witwatersrand Gold Reef in 1884 triggering a gold rush and the establishment of Bantjes Consolidated Mines, the first gold mines in Johannesburg.

== Legacy ==
Bantjes Road in Johannesburg and Bantjes Avenue in the Discovery suburb of Roodepoort are named after him. Kruger Avenue is placed beside Bantjes Avenue due to their close association. Jan Bantjes Road in the suburb of Montana Park, Pretoria is named after him.

== Bibliography ==
- Johannes Meintjes, The Voortrekkers: The Story of the Great Trek and the Making of South Africa, 1973
- Eily Gledhill, In the Steps of Piet Retief, 1980
- Alf Wannenburgh, Forgotten Frontiersmen, 1980
