= Ntuli people =

The Ntuli people were a zulu clan in South Africa that held their own chiefdom title. They lived along the bank of the Thukela River in Kwazulu-Natal.

== History ==
Under the leadership of Godide kaNdlela and Mavumengwana kaNdlela, sons of Ndlela kaSompisi, they played a major part in the zulu counterraid at Middle Drift in June 1879. After the partition of Zululand they were placed in John Robert Dunn's chiefdom.

=== Conflicts where the Ntuli were involved ===
- Middle Drift raid in June 1879.
- Battle of Isandlwana.

== See also ==
- Ndlela kaSompisi
