= Covenant Monument =

Provincial heritage site in South Africa

Coordinates: 25°40′00″S 30°05′00″E

The Covenant Monument is a provincial heritage site in Belfast in the Mpumalanga province of South Africa.

In 1982 it was described in the Government Gazette as

This obelisk was erected in 1886 to commemorate the vow taken by Andries Pretorius and his men shortly before the Battle of Blood River in 1838. It is the oldest monument of its kind in the Transvaal.
