= Erasmus Smit =

Dutch missionary (1778-1863)

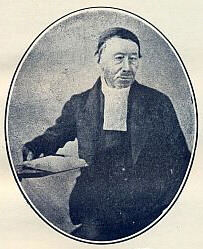
- Born: Erasmus Smit; 28 August 1778; Buiksloot, Netherlands
- Died: 3 August 1863 (aged 84); Pietermaritzburg, South Africa
- Occupation: missionary

Erasmus Smit (1778, Buiksloot – 1863, Pietermaritzburg) was the first minister of the Voortrekkers.

== Biography ==
He was born on 2 August 1778 in Buiksloot near Amsterdam. He was the son of a mate on a ship trading with the West Indies. He spent some of his youth in an orphanage. He became a missionary in America in 1801 and arrived at the Cape in 1804. He worked with Dr. Johannes van der Kemp at Bethelsdorp. After the Dutch Reformed Church refused to ordain him, he became a teacher. He married the sister of the Voortrekker leader Gerrit Maritz and joined the Voortrekkers in 1836. He became their unofficial minister, regularly holding services, performing marriages and accompanying the Trek to Natal. His diary is an important document of the Trek. He settled in Pietermaritzburg where he died in 1863.

== Sources ==
- (in Afrikaans) Swart, M.J., e.a. (red.): Afrikaanse Kultuuralmanak. Aucklandpark: Federasie van Afrikaanse Kultuurvereniginge, 1980, p. 152.
- Schoeman, Karel: Die wêreld van Susanna Smit 1799-1863, Human & Rousseau, Kaapstad, 1995
- Smit, Erasmus:, Joernaal van 'n trek: uit die dagboek van Erasmus Smit red. Merwe Scholtz, Tafelberg, 1988 ISBN 0624026779
- Encyclopaedia of Southern Africa, Eric Rosenthal, 1967
