= Day of Reconciliation =

Public holiday in South Africa on 16 December

- The National flag largely represents peace and unity.
- Also called: Reconciliation day
- Observed by: Republic of South Africa
- Date: 16 December
- First time: 16 December 1995
- Related to: Day of the Vow

The Day of Reconciliation is a public holiday in South Africa held annually on 16 December. The holiday came into effect in 1995 after the end of apartheid, with the intention of fostering reconciliation and national unity for the country. This day was first celebrated as Dingane's Day before being subsequently replaced with the Day of Reconciliation. Recognizing the need for racial harmony, the government chose the date for its significance to both Afrikaner and indigenous South African cultures. The celebration of the Day of Reconciliation can take the form of remembering past history, recognizing veterans' contributions, marching, and other festivities.

The origins of the celebration for Afrikaners goes back to the Day of the Vow, which commemorates the Voortrekker victory over the Zulus at the Battle of Blood River on 16 December 1838. For black and indigenous South Africans, the date marks both peaceful protests against racial injustice and the founding of the Umkhonto we Sizwe paramilitary wing of the African National Congress (ANC) on 16 December 1961. Nelson Mandela and the South African Truth and Reconciliation Commission chose a day that was special to both ethno-racial groups in the country in order to work on healing the damage done by apartheid.

== Date and observance ==
The first time the Day of Reconciliation was celebrated as a public holiday was in 1995. The new government chose to represent national unity by choosing a date that had significance for "both the Afrikaner and liberation struggle traditions".

On Day of Reconciliation, cultural groups participate in parades and various festivities take place throughout the country. On Day of Reconciliation 2013, a statue of Nelson Mandela, the first black president of South Africa, was unveiled at the Union Buildings in Pretoria. During the celebration in 2009, President Jacob Zuma honored forgotten heroes of South Africa, including inscribing around 100 dead veterans' names on the Wall of Names at Freedom Park. In 2008, the first victim of "necklacing", Maki Skosana, was given a tombstone and remembered. For the celebration in 2001, the African National Congress (ANC) remembered the police raid that led to the Rivonia trial. Some of the communities take part in a walk which also serve as a memorial to Mandela. Other parts of South Africa have chosen to emphasize their need for racial harmony in their communities.

Each year has had a different theme. For example:

- 2013: Nation Building, Social Cohesion, and Reconciliation.
- 2014: Social Cohesion, Reconciliation, and National Unity in the 20 Years of Democracy.
- 2015: Bridging the Divide: Building a common South African nationhood towards a national development state.
- 2016: Bridging The Divide Towards A Non-Racist Society.
- 2017: The Year of OR Tambo: Reconciliation through Radical Socio-Economic Transformation.
- 2018: The Year of Nelson Mandela and Albertina Sisulu: Liberators for Reconciliation.
- 2019: The Year of Indigenous Languages: Supporting National Reconciliation Through the Promotion, Development and Preservation of Indigenous Languages.
- 2020: United In Action Against Racism, Gender-based Violence and Other Intolerances.
- 2021: The year of Charlotte Maxeke: Promoting Reconciliation During the 25th Anniversary of the Constitution
- 2022: National Unity, Healing, and Renewal

== Origin ==
=== Afrikaner origins ===
For Afrikaners, 16 December was commemorated as the Day of the Vow, also known as Day of the Covenant or Dingaansdag (Dingaan's Day). The Day of the Vow was a religious holiday commemorating the Voortrekker victory over the Zulus at the Battle of Blood River in 1838, and is still celebrated by some Afrikaners. On that day, 470 Voortrekkers were attacked in an early morning battle led by Dingane's generals. The Voortrekkers defeated the Zulus who numbered in the tens of thousands and during the battle, 3,000 Zulu warriors were killed. The event became a "rallying point for the development of Afrikaner nationalism, culture and identity."

The religious significance of the event, where it is called Day of the Covenant or Day of the Vow, involves the belief that the Voortrekker victory of the Zulus was ordained by God. The General Synod of the Afrikaners' Natal Churches chose 16 December as "an ecclesiastical day of thanksgiving by all its congregations" in 1864. Later, in 1894, Dingane's Day was declared a public holiday by the Government of the Orange Free State.

During the Apartheid era, 16 December continued to be celebrated as the Day of the Vow and the Day of the Covenant. In 1952, Dingane's Day was changed to Day of the Covenant and in 1980 was changed to The Day of the Vow. The Voortrekker Monument in Pretoria was erected on 16 December 1949 to commemorate Dingane's Day.

The last year South Africa celebrated Day of the Vow was in 1994. The transition from Day of the Vow to Day of Reconciliation was viewed with mixed emotions for Afrikaners.

=== African origins ===
Black and indigenous South Africans who did not have the right to vote after the South African War, protested racial discrimination on 16 December 1910. Other protests against the government handling of racial discrimination continued to be held on 16 December. In 1929, 1930 and 1934, anti-pass demonstrations were held by the Communist Party of South Africa (CPSA) on that day. The All African Convention (AAC) was held during the same time in 1935, covering dates 15 December through 18 December.

Much later, when efforts of passive protest and resistance against apartheid had been unsuccessful, the African National Congress (ANC) decided to form a military or armed group. The decision to move to armed resistance happened after the ANC was banned by the government. Nelson Mandela believed that non-violent resistance was not working to stop Apartheid, and advocated for violent insurrection. The date of 16 December is the anniversary of the first bomb bombs carried out by Umkhonto we Sizwe ("Spear of the Nation" or MK), the armed wing of the ANC in 1961. On that day, Umkhonto we Sizwe enacted its "first acts of sabotage" which included bomb blasts against government buildings in Johannesburg, Port Elizabeth and Durban. The day was specifically chosen due to the cultural significance to the Afrikaner people. Also on 16 December 1961, the Umkhonto we Sizwe distributed leaflets describing how the group "will carry on the struggle for freedom and democracy by new methods, which are necessary to complement the actions of the established national liberation organisations."

=== Day of Reconciliation ===
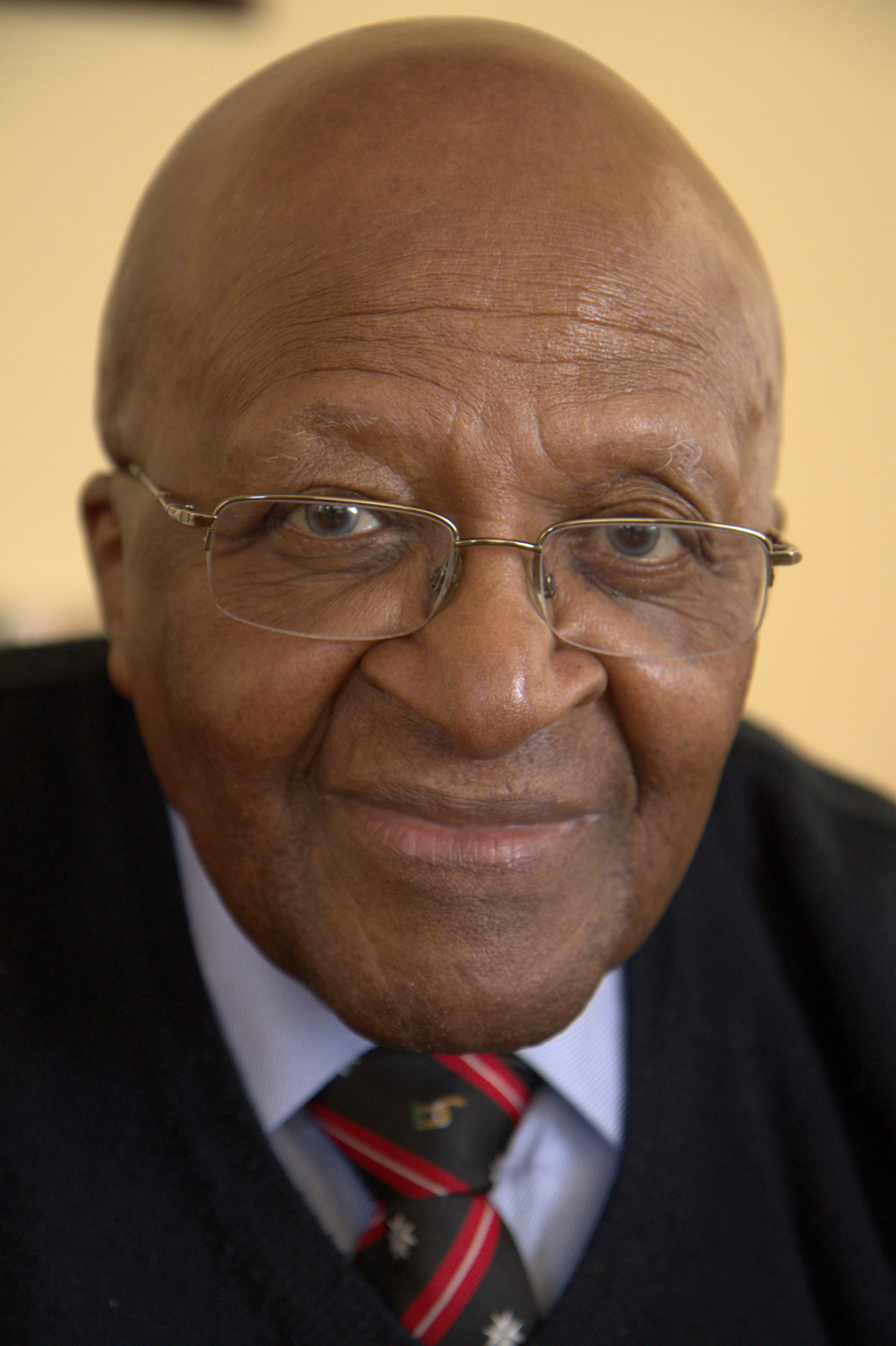
Desmond Tutu spoke about the purpose of the holiday in 1995.

When Apartheid ended, it was decided to keep 16 December as a public holiday, but to infuse it "with the purpose of fostering reconciliation and national unity." It was established by the government in 1994. Nelson Mandela was part of the group of politicians that helped start the idea for the holiday. On 16 December 1995, the first celebration took place. The first meeting of the South African Truth and Reconciliation Commission also took place on 16 December 1995. In an address in 1995, Archbishop Desmond Tutu described the holiday as serving the need of healing the wounds of Apartheid.

The holiday is also used to celebrate minority cultural groups in South Africa, such as the San people. South African President, Jacob Zuma, in 2009, also stressed that the holiday was meant to also promote "non-sexism".

=== Other significance ===
It is the first of four public holidays observed at the height of the Southern Hemisphere summer, along with Christmas Day, Day of Goodwill and New Year's Day. Many small businesses close down and employees go on leave over this period.

== See also ==
- South African apartheid referendum
