= Battle of Blood River =

Zulu–Boer War in 1838, the battle of the Great Trek

Coordinates: 28°6′19″S 30°32′30″E

- Part of the Great Trek
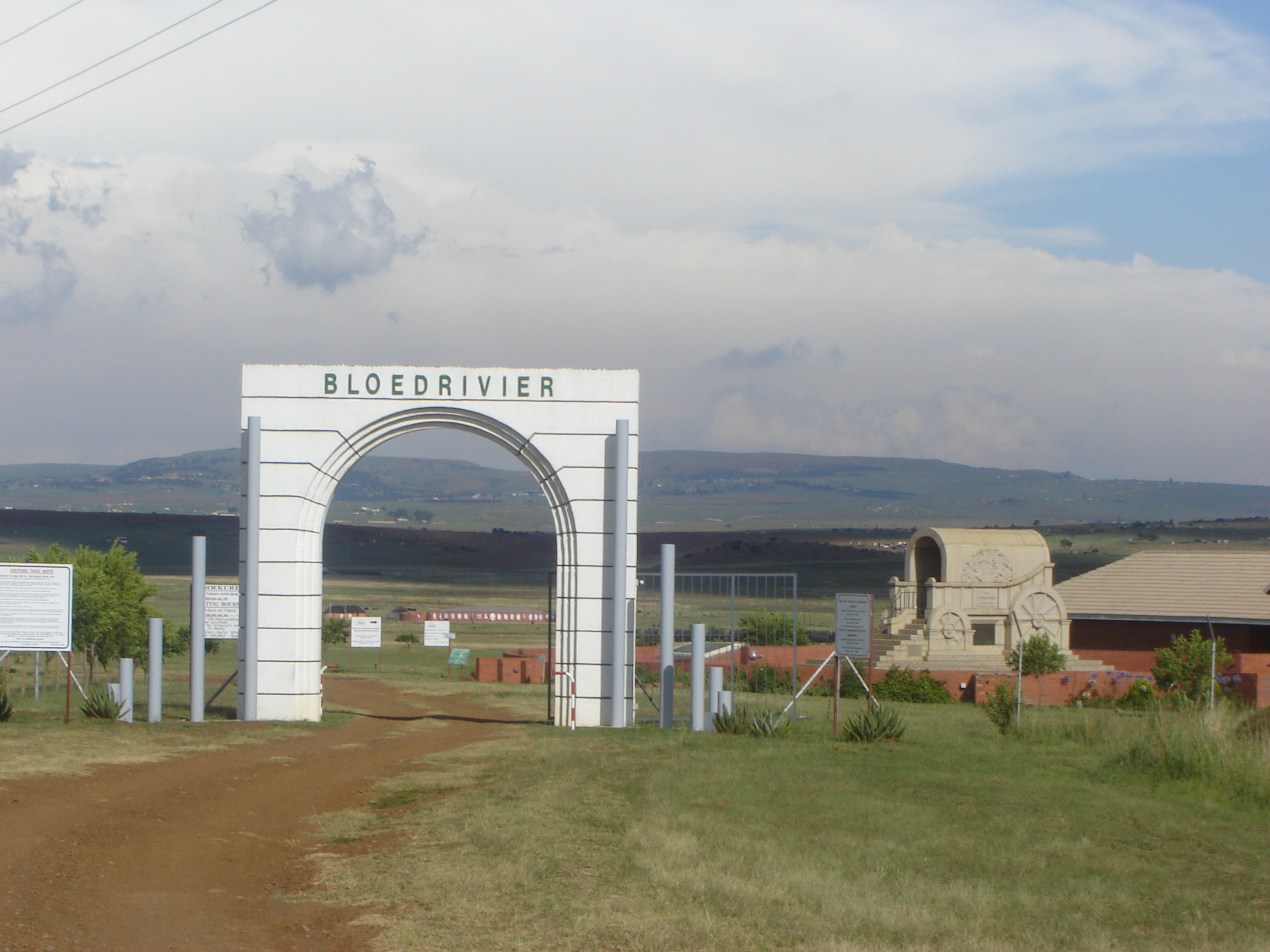
- Entrance to the Battle of Blood River Monument in Kwazulu-Natal
Date	16 December 1838
Location	Blood/Ncome river, KwaZulu-Natal, South Africa
Result	Voortrekker victory

Belligerents
Voortrekkers	Zulu Kingdom

Commanders and leaders
Andries Pretorius; Sarel Cilliers	Dambuza; Ndlela kaSompisi and Dingane

Strength
664 men: 464 Voortrekkers; 200 servants; 2 artillery pieces	25,000–30,000 men

Casualties and losses
3 wounded	3,000+ killed

The Battle of Blood River, or Voortrekker–Zulu War, (16 December 1838) was fought on the bank of the Ncome River, in what is today KwaZulu-Natal, South Africa between 464 Voortrekkers ("Pioneers"), led by Andries Pretorius, and an estimated 25,000 to 30,000 Zulu. Estimations of casualties amounted to over 3,000 of King Dingane's soldiers dead, including two Zulu princes competing with Prince Mpande for the Zulu throne. Three Voortrekker commando members were lightly wounded, including Pretorius.

The year 1838 was the most difficult period for the Voortrekkers from when they left the Cape Colony, till the end of the Great Trek. They faced many difficulties and much bloodshed before they found freedom and a safe homeland in their Republic of Natalia. This was only achieved after defeating the Zulu Kingdom, at the Battle of Blood River, which took place on Sunday 16 December 1838. This battle would not have taken place if the Zulu King had honoured the agreement that he had made with the Voortrekkers to live together peacefully. The Zulu king knew that they outnumbered the Voortrekkers and decided to overthrow them and that led to the Battle of Blood River.

After these two battles, Dingane's prime minister and commander in the Battle of Blood River, General Ndlela, who had also been Mpande’s personal protector, was strangled to death by Dingane for high treason.

== Background ==
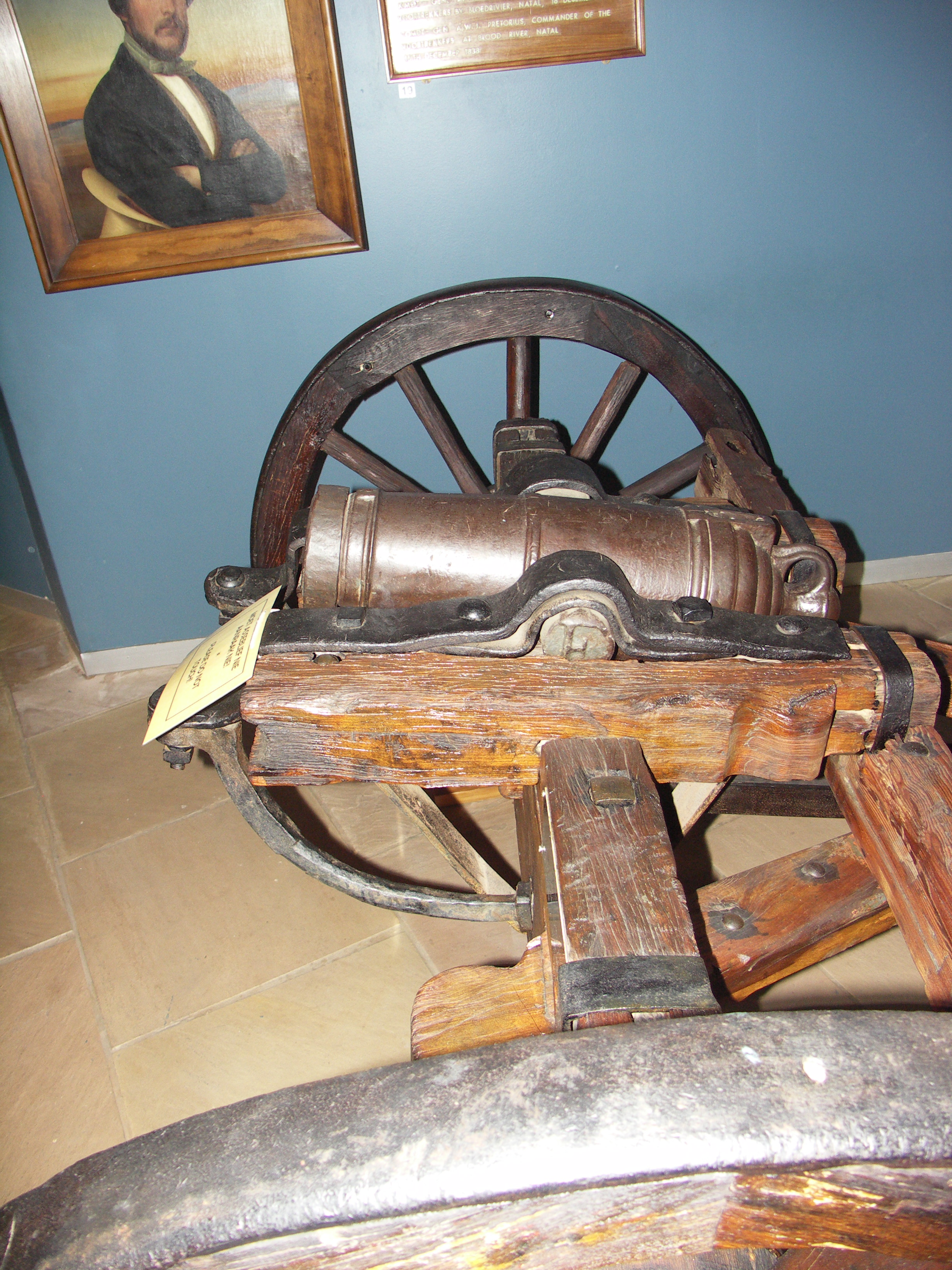
The carronade used during the battle on an improvised carriage Andries Pretorius brought with him from the Cape.

The trekkers—called Voortrekkers after 1880—chose to retaliate after the betrayal murder of chief Trekker leader Piet Retief and his entire entourage, and ten days later the Weenen/Bloukrans massacre where "not a soul was spared."

Dingane had agreed that, if Retief could recover approximately 700 head of cattle stolen from the Zulus by the Tlokwa, he would let them have land upon which to establish farms.

On 6 February 1838, two days after the signing of a negotiated land settlement deal between Retief and Dingane at UmGungundlovu, written by Jan Gerritze Bantjes (1817–1887) which included Trekker access to Port Natal, which the British also had interest in, Dingane invited Retief and his party into his royal residence for a beer-drinking farewell. The accompanying request for the surrender of Trekker muskets at the entrance was taken as normal protocol when appearing before the king. While the Trekkers were being entertained by Dingane's dancing warriors/soldiers, Dingane suddenly accused the visiting party of witchcraft and ordered his men: "Bulalani abathakathi" (Kill the sorcerers...). Dingane's soldiers bludgeoned Retief's party to death.

Immediately after the UmGungundlovu massacre, Dingane sent out his impis (regiments) to attack several Trekker encampments at night time, killing an estimated 500 men, women, children, and servants, most notably at Blaukraans.

Help arrived from farmers in the Cape Colony, and the Trekkers in Natal subsequently requested the pro-independence Andries Pretorius to leave the Cape Colony, in order to defend the Voortrekkers who had settled in Natal.

After the Battle of Blood River, the Dingane-Retief treaty written by Jan Gerritze Bantjes was found on Retief's bodily remains, providing a driving force for an overt alliance against Dingane between Prince Mpande and Pretorius.

== Prelude ==
=== War strategies of the generals ===
On 26 November 1838, Andries Pretorius (1798–1853) was appointed as Commander of 64 wagons and 464+ heavily armed Boer combatants directed against Dingane at UmGungundlovu with Jan Gerritze Bantjes (1817–1882) as his war secretary. By December 1838, Prince Mpande and 17,000 followers had already fled from Dingane, who was seeking to assassinate Mpande. In support of Prince Mpande as Dingane's replacement, Pretorius' strategy was to target Dingane only. To allow Prince Mpande to oust King Dingane through military might, Pretorius had first to weaken Dingane's personal military power base in UmGungundlovu. Dingane's royal residence at UmGungundlovu was naturally protected against attack by hilly and rocky terrain all around, as well as an access route via Italeni passing through a narrow defile.

Earlier on 9 April 1838, a Trekker horse commando without ox wagons, thereafter called the "Flight Commando", had unsuccessfully attempted to penetrate the UmGungundlovu defense at nearby Italeni valley, resulting in the loss of several Trekker lives. Trekker leader Hendrik Potgieter had abandoned all hope of engaging Dingane in UmGungundlovu after losing the battle of Italeni, and subsequently had migrated with his group out of Natal. To approach UmGungundlovu via the Italeni defile with ox wagons would force the wagons into an open column, instead of an enclosed laager as successfully employed defensively at Veglaer on 12 August 1838.

The military commander during Dingane's attack on Veglaer was Ndlela kaSompisi. The highly experienced general Ndlela had served under Shaka, and was also prime minister and chief advisor under Dingane. Ndlela with his 10,000 troops had retreated from Veglaer, after three days and nights of fruitless attempts to penetrate the enclosed Trekker wagon laager.

General Ndlela personally protected Prince Mpande from Dingane's repeated assassination plans. King Dingane desired to have his half brother Mpande, the only prince with children, eliminated as a threat to his throne. Prince Mpande was married to Msukilethe, a daughter of general Ndlela. General Ndlela, like Pretorius the promoter of Prince Mpande, was responsible for Dingane's UmGungundlovu defense during the Trekkers' second attack attempt under Pretorius in December 1838. Given general Ndlela's previous defense and attack experience at Italeni and Veglaer during April 1838 and August 1838 respectively, Ndlela's tactical options were limited. Proven UmGungundlovu defense tactics were to attack Trekker commandos in the rocky and hilly terrain on the narrowing access route at Italeni, thereby neutralising the advantages mounted riflemen had over spear-carrying foot soldiers. Ndlela had to let Pretorius come close to UmGungundlovu at Italeni and lure the Trekkers into attack. Ndlela was not to attack the Trekkers when they were in a defensive wagon laager position, especially not during the day. The problem for Pretorius was that he had somehow to find a way to make Dingane's soldiers attack him in a defensive laager position at a place of his choice, far away from UmGungundlovu and Italeni.

On 6 December 1838, 10 days before the Battle of Blood River, Pretorius and his commando including Alexander Biggar as translator had a meeting with friendly Zulu chiefs at Danskraal, so named for the Zulu dancing that took place in the Zulu kraal that the Trekker commando visited. With the intelligence received at Danskraal, Pretorius became confident enough to propose a vow to God, which demanded the celebration, by the commando and their posterity, of the coming victory over Dingane. The covenant included that a church would be built in honour of God, should the commando be successful and reach UmGungundlovu alive in order to diminish the power of Dingane. Building a church in Trekker emigrant context was symbolic for establishing a settled state.

After the meeting with friendly Zulu chiefs at Danskraal, Pretorius let the commando relax and do their washing for a few days at Wasbank till 9 December 1838. From Wasbank they slowly and daily moved closer to the site of the Battle of Blood River, practicing laager defence tactics every evening for a week long. Then, by halting his advance towards UmGungundlovu on 15 December 1838, 40 km before reaching the defile at Italeni, Pretorius had eliminated the Italeni terrain trap.

=== Location and preparation ===
On Saturday, 15 December 1838, after the Trekker wagons crossed the Buffalo River 10 km SW of the actual battle site and still 80 kilometres (50 mi) from their target UmGungundlovu, an advance scouting party - including Pretorius - got news of a large Zulu force in rugged terrain to the east trying to lure the Boers into a trap, as had been the case in April the same year with fatal consequences. While Cilliers wanted to ride out and attack, Pretorius declined the opportunity to engage Dingane's soldiers away from their base as had been the trap at Italeni valley. Instead, Pretorius decided on a fortified laager on the terrain of his own choosing, in the hope that general Ndlela would attack Pretorius on his terms rather than the other way around.

As the site for the defensive wagon laager, Pretorius chose a defensible position close to a vertical 8m descent into a deep hippo pool in the Ncombe River, providing excellent protection on two sides. The wide-open area to the front of the laager provided absolutely no cover for an attacking force. The battle was set with the laager protected on two flanks. As usual, the ox-wagons were drawn into the typical protective laager. Movable wooden barriers and ladders which could be quickly opened for cavalry were fastened between the wagon wheels to prevent intruders, with two smoothbore, short barrel artillery pieces positioned at the corners. Andries Pretorius had brought a 6-pound naval carronade with him from the Cape, mounted on a gun carriage improvised from a wagon axle, and named Grietjie. The other ordnance piece is unknown, but is currently depicted as a 4-pound smoothbore cannon, by then obsolete in most European armies. Both were used to fire devastating grapeshot.

As evening approached, a thick mist settled over the wagon site, above which the sky was clear. According to Afrikaner traditions, the Zulu were afraid to attack at the night due to superstitions and the eerie glow of lamps which the Boers hung on sjamboks [whip-stocks] around the laager. Whether or not there is any truth in this, historian S.P. Mackenzie has speculated that the Zulu held back until what they perceived as the necessary numbers had arrived. Some of the Zulus only arrived near sunrise by following the tracks of the wagons. Due to some recent heavy rains the Ncombe River was swollen making crossing the river difficult.

During the night of 15 December, six Zulu regiments - an estimated 20,000 (or more) Zulu soldiers led by Ndlela kaSompisi commander-in-chief of the Zulu armed forces, - crossed the Ncome River and started massing around the encampment, while the elite forces of senior general Ndlela did not cross, thereby splitting the army in two.

== Battle ==
On 16 December, dawn broke on a clear day, revealing that "all of Zululand sat there", according to one Trekker eyewitness. General Ndlela and his crack troops, the Black and White Shields, remained on the other side of the river, observing Dambuza's men at the laager from a safe position across the hippo pool. According to the South African Department of Art and Culture:

In ceremonies that lasted about three days, izinyanga zempi, specialist war doctors, prepared izinteleze medicines which made warriors invincible in the face of their opponents.

This could partly help explain why Dambuza's forces were sitting on the ground close to the wagon laager when the Trekkers first saw them.

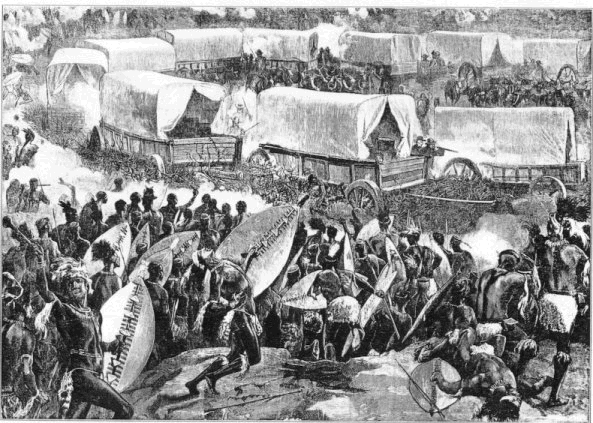
An artist's impression of the Battle of Blood River.

Dambuza's regiments repeatedly stormed the laager but could not break through. The attackers were hindered by a change introduced during Shaka's rule that replaced most of the longer throwing spears with short stabbing spears. In close combat the stabbing spear provided obvious advantages over its longer cousin. A Zulu eyewitness said that their first charge was mown down like grass by the Boer muskets.

As Bantjes wrote in his journal:

Sunday, December 16 was like being newly born for us - the sky was clear, the weather fine and bright. We hardly saw the twilight of the break of day or the guards, who were still at their posts and could just make out the distant Zulus approaching. All the patrols were called back into the laager by firing alarm signals from the cannons. The enemy came forward at full speed and suddenly they had encircled the area around the laager. As it got lighter, so we could see them approaching over their predecessors who had already been shot back. Their rapid approach (though terrifying to witness due to their great numbers) was an impressive sight. The Zulus came in regiments, each captain with his men behind (as the patrols had seen them coming the day before) until they had surrounded us. I could not count them, but I was told that a captive Zulu gave the number at thirty-six regiments, each regiment calculated to be "nine hundred to a thousand men" strong. The battle now began and the cannons unleashed from each gate, such that the battle was fierce and noisy, even the discharging of small arms fire from our marksmen on all sides was like thunder. After more than two hours of fierce battle, the Commander in Chief gave orders that the gates be opened and mounted men sent to fight the enemy in fast attacks, as the enemy near constantly stormed the laager time and again, and he feared the ammunition would soon run out.

With the power of their firearms and with their ox wagons in a laager formation and some effective tactics, the Boers fought off the Zulu. Buckshot was used to maximise casualties. Mackenzie claims that 200 indigenous servants looked after the horses and cattle and helped load muskets, but no definite proof or witness of servants helping to reload is available. Writing in the popular Afrikaans magazine Die Huisgenoot, a Dr. D.J. Kotze said that this group consisted of fifty-nine "non-white helpers and followers" instead of the commonly stated two hundred.

After two hours and four waves of attack, with the intermittent lulls providing crucial reloading and resting opportunities for the Trekkers, Pretorius ordered a group of horsemen to leave the encampment and engage the Zulu in order to induce the disintegration of their formations. The Zulu withstood the charge for some time, but rapid losses led them to scatter. The Trekkers pursued their fleeing enemies and hunted them down for three hours. Cilliers noted later that "we left the Kafirs lying on the ground as thick almost as pumpkins upon the field that has borne a plentiful crop." Bantjes recorded that about 3,000 dead Zulu had been counted, and three Trekkers were wounded. During the chase, Pretorius was wounded in his left hand by an assegaai (Zulu spear). Of the 3,000 dead Zulu soldiers, two were princes, leaving Ndlela's favourite Prince Mpande as frontrunner in the subsequent battle for the Zulu crown.

Four days after the Battle of Blood River, the Trekker commando arrived at King Dingane's great kraal UmGungundlovu (near present-day Eshowe), only to find it deserted and in ashes. The bones of Retief and his men were found and buried, where a memorial stands today. Up to this day 16 December is a public holiday in South Africa; before 1994 it was known as "the Day of the Vow", "the Day of the Covenant" and "Dingaan's Day"; but today it is "the Day of Reconciliation".

== Zulu interpretation of events ==
In the Zulu telling, the "left horn" of the Zulu formation was the only wing in direct contact with the enemy. They descended on the wagon laager, using the morning mist to shield their advance. When the Boers realized they were being confronted by unseen enemies, they shot wildly into the mist, injuring and killing some of the Zulu. Facing this fire, the "left horns" pulled back to intaba kaNdlela, also known as Ndlela's Mountain.

== Aftermath ==
The conflict between Dingane and the Trekkers continued for one more year after the Battle of Blood River. The idea of a decisive victory may have been planted in Pretorius' mind by a Zulu prisoner, who said that most of Dingane's warriors had either been killed or fled. The same prisoner led some of the Trekker party into a trap at the White Umfolozi River, eleven days after the battle at Ncome River. This time the Zulu were victorious. Only when Dingane's brother, Mpande, openly joined the Trekker side with his sizeable army, was Dingane finally defeated in January 1840.

Following the Battle of Maqongqe in January 1840, the forces of Mpande did not wait for Pretorius' cavalry to arrive, and they attacked the remaining regiments of Dingane, who were again under the command of General Ndlela. Ndlela strayed from normal fighting tactics against Mpande, sending in his regiments to fight one at a time, instead of together in ox horn formation. Maquongqe Dingane had to flee Natal completely, but before he did so, he had Ndlela slowly strangled by cow hide for high treason, on the grounds that he had fought for Mpande, with the same disastrous result for Dingane as at Ncome-Blood River. Dambusa, Dingane's other general, had already been executed by Mpande and Pretorius when he fell into their hands before the battle.

Pretorius approved and attended the crowning of Zulu King Mpande in Pietermaritzburg. They agreed on the Tugela River as the border between Zululand and the Republic of Natalia.

== Legacy ==
Popular Afrikaner interpretations of the Battle of Blood River (bolstered by sympathetic historians such as George Theal) played a central role in fostering Afrikaner nationalism. They believe that the battle demonstrated God's intervention and hence their divine right to exist as an independent people. This is stated in the official guidebook of the Voortrekker Monument (unveiled during the centenary celebrations of the Great Trek on 16 December 1949), noting that Afrikaners were a nation of heroes, exemplifying the conclusions drawn from such events. From the Day of the Vow, Afrikaners consider the site and the commemoration of the day as sacred.

Historian S.P. Mackenzie doubts the reported number of Zulu deaths. He compares Zulu casualties at Ncome to battles at Italeni, Isandlwana, and Rorke's Drift. Mackenzie acknowledges that the casualty count was not impossible. Yet, in a similar victory on 15 October 1836 by Trekkers under Hendrik Potgieter over some 9,000 Matabele, the latter suffered only 350 casualties. In 1879, 600 British soldiers with breech-loading rifles caused 2,000 Zulu casualties, perhaps 1,000 killed over three hours before being overrun.

=== Ncome/Blood River monument ===
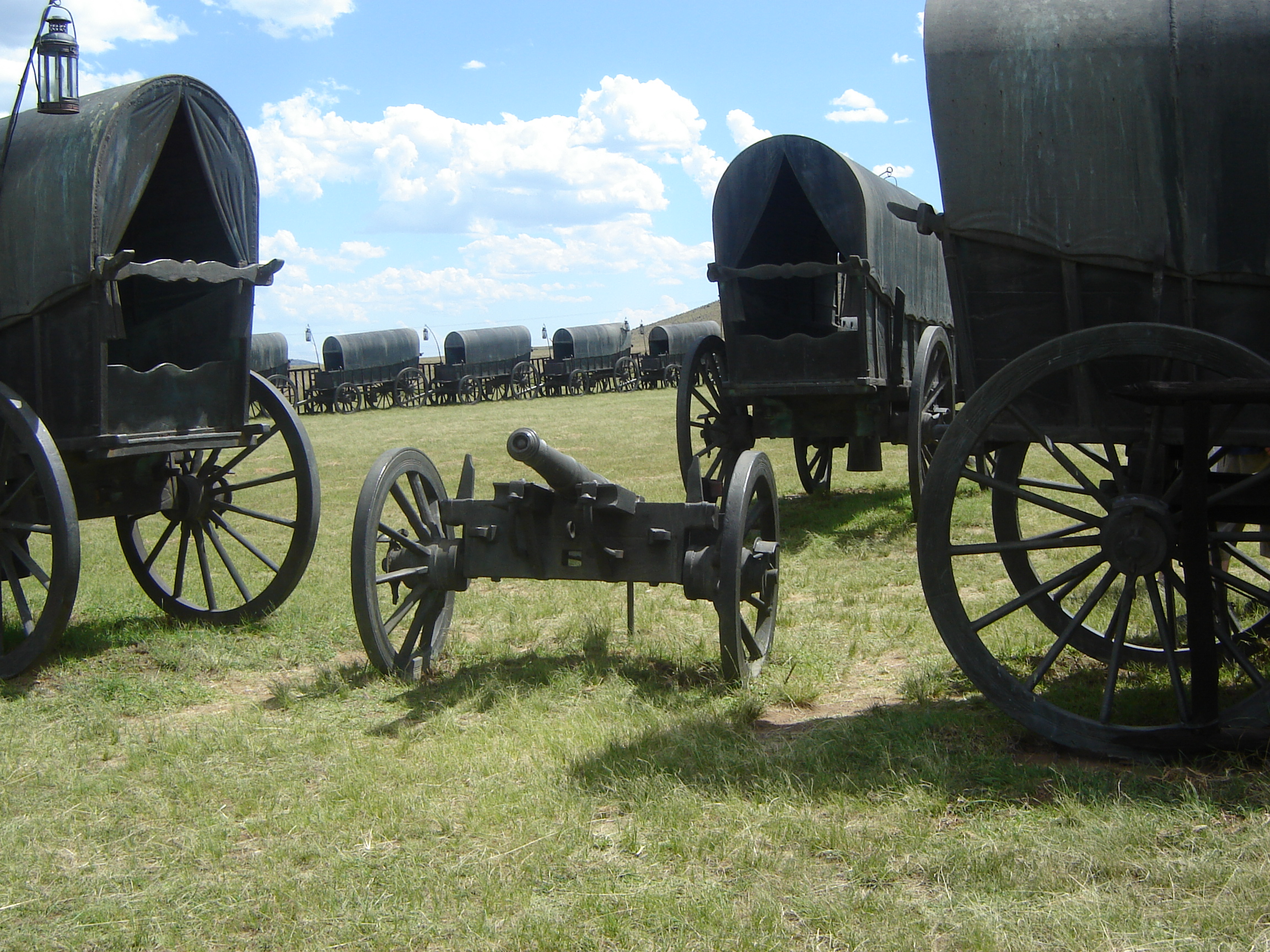
Laager at the Blood River Memorial

A church, called "the Church of the Vow", was built in the Natal town of Pietermaritzburg in 1841, where Pretorius settled on the farm "Welverdient" (English: "Well-earned"), a gift from the Trekkers.

A monument was erected on the site of the battle in 1947, consisting of an ox wagon executed in granite by the sculptor Coert Steynberg. In 1971 a laager of 64 ox wagons cast in bronze (by Unifront Foundry in Edenvale – Fanie de Klerk and Jack Cowlard) was erected, and unveiled on 16 December 1972.

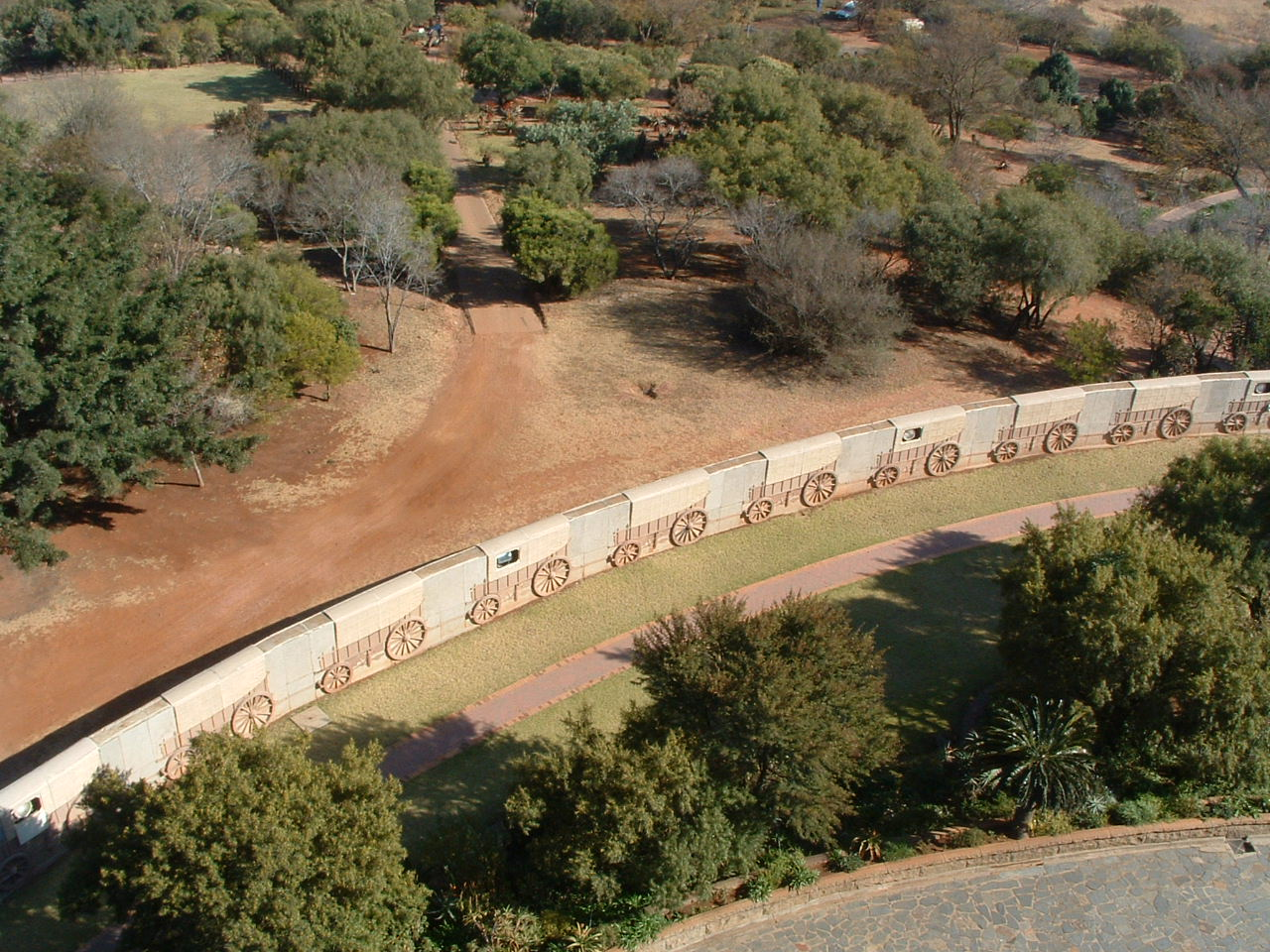
A stone representation at the Voortrekker Monument of the Laager formed at the Battle of Blood River

The Ncome monument on the east side of the river commemorates the fallen Zulu warriors. While the Blood River Memorial is associated with Afrikaner nationalism, the Ncome monument was intended as a symbol of reconciliation—but has become connected with Zulu nationalism.

At 16 December 1998 inauguration of the most recent version of the monument, the Zulu politician and then Minister of Home Affairs, Mangosuthu Buthelezi, apologised to the Afrikaner nation for the death of Piet Retief and the subsequent suffering. At the same time Buthelezi also noted the suffering of the Zulus during Apartheid. He stressed that South Africans needed to consider the day as "a new covenant which binds us to the shared commitment of building a new country."

Today two complexes mark the battle site: the Ncome Monument and Museum Complex east of the Ncome River, and the Blood River Monument and Museum Complex to the west.

=== Ndlela monument ===
South Africa's former president, Jacob Zuma, attended the official inauguration of the Ndlela monument in Eshowe, Kwazulu-Natal.

== See also ==
- Battle of Isandlwana
- Day of the Vow
- List of battles 1801–1900
- Military history of South Africa

== Bibliography ==
- Lyster, Lynn. "The Voortrekkers Vow". Poems of South African History, A.D. 1497–1910. A poem.
- Cameron & Spies (1991). Nuwe Geskiedenis van Suid-Afrika (Revised ed.). Human & Rousseau.
- Mackenzie, S.P. (1997). Revolutionary Armies in the Modern Era: A Revisionist Approach. Routledge. ISBN 978-0-415-09690-4.
- Voigt, J.C. Voigt (1969). Fifty Years of the History of the Republic in South Africa (1795–1845). Vol. 2. ISBN 0-8371-1306-7.
