= Piet Retief =

South African Voortrekker leader (1780-1838)

Pieter Retief
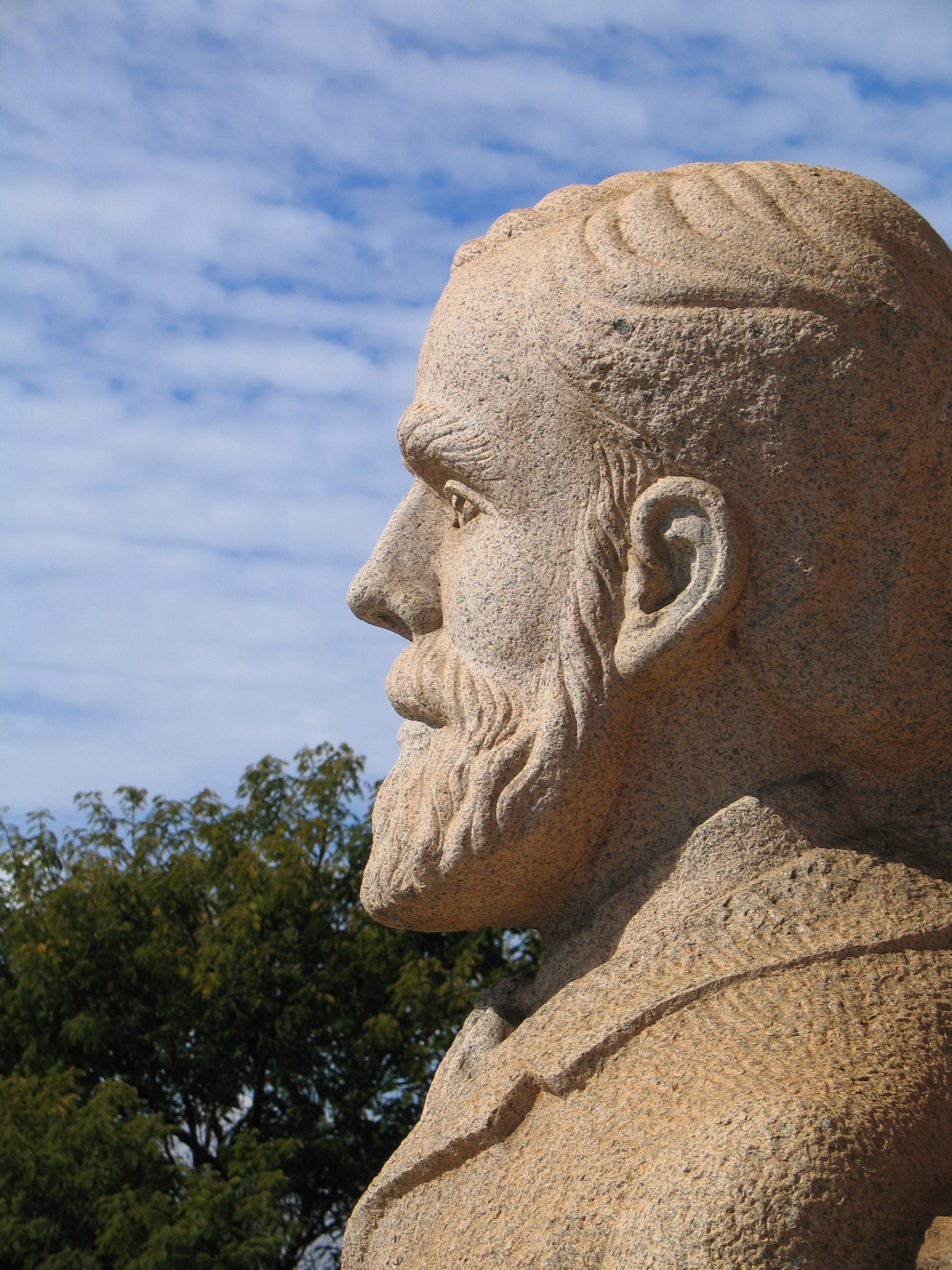
- Statue at the Voortrekker Monument
- Born: Pieter Retief; 12 November 1780; Soetendal, Wagenmakersvallei
- Died: 6 February 1838 (aged 57); KwaMatiwane, near Hlomo amabuto, uMgungundlovu
- Cause of death: Clubbed to death by Zulus
- Body discovered: c. 21 December 1838 KwaMatiwane, uMgungundlovu
- Resting place: 21 December 1838 KwaMatiwane, uMgungundlovu; 28°25′37″S 31°16′12″E
- Spouse: Magdalena Johanna Greyling (née De Wet) (1782–1855)
- Children: Debora Jacoba (1815–1901); Jacobus Francois (1816– ) Magdalena Margaretha (1820–1884); Pieter Cornelis (1823–1838)
- Parent(s): Jacobus Retief (1754–1821); Debora Joubert (c.1749–1814)

Signature
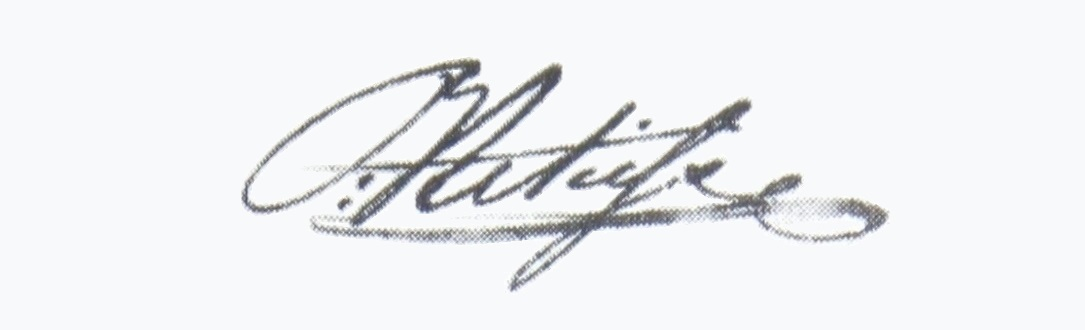

Pieter Retief (12 November 1780 – 6 February 1838) was a Voortrekker leader. Settling in 1814 in the frontier region of the Cape Colony, he later assumed command of punitive expeditions during the sixth Xhosa War. He became a spokesperson for the frontier farmers who voiced their discontent and wrote the Voortrekkers' declaration at their departure from the colony.

He was a leading figure during their Great Trek, and at one stage their elected governor. He proposed Natal as the final destination of their migration and selected a location for its future capital, later named Pietermaritzburg in his honour. The massacre of Retief and his delegation by the Zulu King Dingane and the extermination of several Voortrekker laagercamps in the area of the present town of Weenen led to the Battle of Blood River on the Ncome River. The short-lived Boer republic Natalia suffered from ineffective government and was eventually annexed to the British Cape Colony.

== Early life ==
Retief was born to Jacobus and Debora Retief in the Wagenmakersvallei, Cape Colony, today the town of Wellington, South Africa. His family were Boers of French Huguenot ancestry: his great-grandfather was the 1689 Huguenot refugee François Retif, from Mer, Loir-et-Cher near Blois; the progenitor of the name in South Africa. Retief grew up on the ancestral vineyard Welvanpas, where he worked until the age of 27.

After moving to the vicinity of Grahamstown, Retief, like other Boers, acquired wealth through livestock, but suffered repeated losses from Xhosa raids in the period. These prompted the 6th Cape Frontier War. (Retief had a history of financial trouble. On more than one occasion, he lost money and other possessions, mainly through land speculation. He is reported to have gone bankrupt at least twice, while at the colony and on the frontier.) Such losses impelled many frontier farmers to become Voortrekkers (literally, "forward movers") and to migrate to new lands in the north.

Retief wrote their (Dutch-speaking settlers, or Boer) manifesto, dated 22 January 1837, setting out their long-held grievances against the British government. They believed it had offered them no protection against armed raids by the native Bantu, no redress against Foreign Government Policies (British), and financially broke them through the Slavery Abolition Act 1833 which freed their slaves, with compensation offered to owners that hardly amounted to a quarter of the slaves' market value. Retief's manifesto was published in the Grahamstown Journal on 2 February and De Zuid-Afrikaan on 17 February, just as the emigrant Boers started to leave their homesteads.

== Great Trek ==
Retief's household departed in two wagons from his farm in the Winterberg District in early February 1837 and joined a party of 30 other wagons. The pioneers crossed the Orange River into independent territory. When several parties on the Great Trek converged at the Vet River, Retief was elected "Governor of the United Laagers" and head of "The Free Province of New Holland in South East Africa." This coalition was very short-lived, and Retief became the lone leader of the group moving east.

On 5 October 1837, Retief established a camp of 54 wagons at Kerkenberg near the Drakensberg ridge. He proceeded on horseback the next day, accompanied by Jan Gerritze Bantjes and fourteen men with four wagons, to explore the region between the Drakensberg and Port Natal, now known as kwaZulu Natal. This was Bantjes's second visit to Port Natal, his first having been there in 1834 on the "Kommissitrek" reconnaissance mission. At Port Natal, Retief was taken by the potential of the bay and the possibilities of it becoming a Dutch free trade port. Bantjes and two companions were sent back to the laager at Kerkenberg with a message to the camp on 2 November 1837, announcing to the trekkers that they may now enter Natal.

Due to his favourable impression of the region, Retief started negotiations for land with the Zulu king Dingane kaSenzangakhona (known as Dingane/ Dingaan) in November 1837. After Retief led his band over the Drakensberg Mountains, he convinced Voortrekker leaders Gerrit Maritz and Andries Hendrik Potgieter to join him in January 1838.

On Retief's second visit to Dingane, the Zulu agreed to Boer settlement in Natal, provided that the Boer delegation recover cattle stolen by the rival Tlokwa nation. This the Boers did, their reputation and rifles cowing the people into handing over some 700 head of cattle.

At Retief's request, J.G. Bantjes drew up the famous Piet Retief/Dingaan Treaty outlining the areas of Natal to be secured for the Boers to settle and start their new farms and harbour. This was done and to be ratified at the Zulu King's kraal.

== Death ==
Despite warnings, Retief left the Tugela region on 25 January 1838, in the belief that he could negotiate with Dingane for permanent boundaries for the Natal settlement. The deed of cession of the Tugela-Umzimvubu region, although dated 4 February 1838, was signed by Dingane on 6 February 1838, with the two sides recording three witnesses each. Dingane invited Retief's party to witness a special performance by his soldiers, whereupon Dingane ordered his soldiers to capture Retief's party and their coloured servants.

Retief, his son (Pieter Cornelis), men, and servants, about 100 people in total, were taken to a nearby ridge, kwaMatiwane, named after Matiwane, one of Dingane's tribal chiefs who was executed in a horrific manner. The Zulus killed Retief's entire party by clubbing them, and killed Retief last, so as to witness the deaths of his son, and his comrades. Retief's chest was sawn open, and his heart and liver removed and brought to Dingane in a cloth. Their bodies were left on the KwaMatiwane hillside to be eaten by vultures and scavengers, as was Dingane's custom with his enemies. Dingane then directed the attack against the Voortrekker laagers, which plunged the migrant movement into temporary disarray and in total 534 men, women and children were killed.

Following the Voortrekker victory at Blood River, Andries Pretorius and his "victory commando" recovered the remains of the Retief party. They buried them on 21 December 1838.

Also recovered was the undamaged deed of cession from Retief's leather purse, written by Jan Gerritze Bantjes, Retief's secretary, as later verified by a member of the "victory commando", E.F. Potgieter. Two exact copies survive, (either of which could be the original) but legend states the original deed disappeared in transit to the Netherlands during the Anglo-Boer War. The site of the Retief grave was more or less forgotten until pointed out in 1896 by J.H. Hattingh, a surviving member of Pretorius's commando. A monument recording the names of the members of Retief's delegation was erected near the grave in 1922.

== Legacy ==
The town of Piet Retief was named after him as was (partially) the city of Pietermaritzburg. It is reported by the Voortrekker Minister of that time, Erasmus Smit, who served with Piet Retief, in his Diary, that on 23 October 1838 the Voortrekker "Council of the legislative body...has named the first village settlement... Pieter Maritz Burg. The first name is after the late deceased His Excellency Pieter Retief, formerly the Governor, and the second name is after His Honour the late deceased G.M. Maritz, the President of the Council of policy in the camp."

Some however continue to speculate that the "Maritz" part was a naming after Gerrit Maritz, another Voortrekker leader, from the start. However, Pietermaritzburg was originally Pietermauritzburg, thereby incorporating both Retief's first and second name. It was only afterwards that the "u" was dropped and it was decreed that Maritz also be remembered in the title.

Rhodes University has a residence named after Retief, in Kimberley Hall.

== Bibliography ==
- Kenney, R.U., Piet Retief, The Dubious Hero, Cape Town, Human & Rousseau, 1976.
- A.J.P. Opperman, Piet Retief, Perskor, 1986.
