= Andries Pretorius =

South African politician (1798–1853)

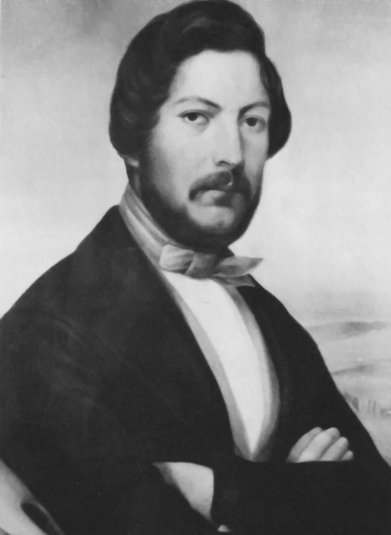

Prime Minister of Natalia Republic
- In office 1839–1843

Personal details
- Born: Andries Wilhelmus Jacobus Pretorius; 27 November 1798 Graaff-Reinet, Dutch Cape Colony
- Died: 23 July 1853 (aged 54) Magaliesberg, South African Republic
- Resting place: Heroes' Acre, Pretoria, Gauteng, South Africa
- Spouse: Christina Petronella (de Wit) Pretorius (1799 - 1848)
- Children: Marthinus Wessel Pretorius

Military service
- Allegiance: South African Republic; Natalia Republic; Voortrekkers
- Years of service: 1838–1852
- Rank: Commandant-General
- Commands: Transvaal and Orange River Commandos
- Battles/wars: Battle of Blood River; Battle of Boomplaats

Andries Wilhelmus Jacobus Pretorius (27 November 1798 – 23 July 1853) was a leader of the Boers who was instrumental in the creation of the South African Republic, as well as the earlier but short-lived Natalia Republic, in present-day South Africa. The large city of Pretoria, executive capital of South Africa, is named after him.

== Early life and background ==
Pretorius was educated at home, and although a school education was not a priority on the eastern frontier of the Cape Colony, he was literate enough to read the Bible and write his thoughts down on paper. Pretorius had five children, the eldest of whom, Marthinus Wessel Pretorius, later became the first president of the South African Republic (Transvaal).

Pretorius descended from the line of the earliest Dutch settlers in the Cape Colony. He belonged to the fifth generation of the progenitor, Johannes Pretorius, the son of Reverend Wessel Schulte from the Netherlands. Schulte, during his theology studies at the University of Leiden had changed his name to the Latin form and became Wesselius Praetorius (which was later simplified as Pretorius).

Although the details of Andries Pretorius's early life are scant, it is most likely that he grew up on his father's farm named Driekoppen, about 40 kilometres north-east of Graaff-Reinet.

== Career ==
In September 1839, after the company of Gerrit Maritz left Graaff-Reinet to go north, those that stayed behind, including Pretorius, began to strongly consider leaving the Cape Colony. He left his home in October 1837 on a scouting expedition to visit the Trekkers. Eventually, Pretorius left the Cape Colony permanently. He abandoned his trek towards the Modderrivier and made haste to the Klein-Tugela River in Natal when he was summoned to lead the Voortrekkers, who were there leaderless; Gerrit Maritz died of illness, and Andries Potgieter left Natal, moving deeper inland. At the command of the Zulu king Dingane, Piet Retief was murdered in February 1838 along with his men. They were invited under false pretenses, during a negotiations visit, along with 70 men with boys among them and with 30 servants to enter the Zulu kraal Mgungundlovu unarmed.

Pretorius arrived at the desperate Trekkers' main camp on 22 November 1838. Pretorius's diligence and thorough action immediately instilled confidence, and he was appointed chief commander of the punitive commando against Dingane. Pretorius led 470 men with 64 wagons into Dingane's territory, and on the dawn of 16 December 1838, next to the Ncome River, they achieved victory over an attacking army of 10,000 to 15,000 Zulu warriors. The Voortrekkers fought with muzzle-loading muskets and used two small cannons. The Zulus sustained losses of an estimated 3,000 warriors in the Battle of Blood River. The Boers sustained no casualties. Three men were injured, including Andries Pretorius, who was injured on his hand by an assegai.

The Boers believe that God granted them victory and thus promised that they and their descendants would commemorate the day of the battle as a day of rest. Boers memorialized it as "Dingane's Day" until 1910. It was renamed "Day of the Vow," later "Day of the Covenant," and made a public holiday by the first government of the Union of South Africa, which later became the Republic of South Africa. After the end of apartheid in 1994, the new totally democratic government kept the day as a public holiday as an act of conciliation to the Boers but renamed it "Day of Reconciliation".

In January 1840, Pretorius, with a commando of 400 burghers, helped Mpande in his revolt against his half-brother Dingane. Mpande and Pretorius defeated Dingane's army at the Battle of Maqongqo, which forced Dingane and those loyal to him into exile, after which Dingane was soon murdered. Immediately thereafter, Pretorius announced that Boer territory in Natal had been greatly enlarged due to the terms agreed with Mpande for Boer assistance. He was also the leader of the Natal Boers faction, which opposed British designs on territory they had already staked claims on. In 1842, Pretorius besieged the small British garrison at Durban but retreated to Pietermaritzburg on the arrival of reinforcements under Colonel Josias Cloete. Afterward, he exerted his influence with the Boers to reach a peaceful solution with the British authorities, who annexed Natalia instead.

Remaining in Natal as a British subject, in 1847 Pretorius was chosen by the Boer farmers to present their grievances to the governor of Cape Colony. They were concerned about the continuous migration of natives who were assigned locations to the detriment of Boer land claims. Pretorius went to Grahamstown to seek an audience with the governor, Sir Henry Pottinger, but he refused to see Pretorius or receive any communication from him. Pretorius returned to Natal determined to abandon his farm and move beyond the reach of the British authorities.

With a considerable following, he was preparing to cross the Drakensberg when Sir Harry Smith, newly appointed governor of the Cape, reached the emigrants' camp on the Tugela River in January 1848. Smith promised the farmers protection from the natives and persuaded many of the party to remain. Pretorius departed, and, on the proclamation of British sovereignty up to the Vaal River, fixed his residence in the Magaliesberg, north of that river. He was chosen by the burghers living on both banks of the Vaal as their commandant-general. At the request of the Boers at Winburg, Pretorius crossed the Vaal in July and led the anti-British party in a brief revolt, occupying Bloemfontein on 20 July. In August, he was defeated at Boomplaats by Smith and retreated to the north of the Vaal. He became leader of one of the largest of the parties into which the Transvaal Boers were divided, and commandant-general of Potchefstroom and Rustenburg, his principal rival being Commandant-General of Zoutpansberg A. H. Potgieter.

In 1851, Boer malcontents in the Orange River Sovereignty and the Basotho chief Moshoeshoe I asked Pretorius to come to their aid. He announced his intention of crossing the Vaal to "restore order" in the Sovereignty. His goal was to obtain an acknowledgment of the independence of the Transvaal Boers from the British. Having decided on a policy of abandonment, the British cabinet entertained his proposal. The government withdrew its reward of 2000 pounds, which had been offered for his capture after the Boomplaats battle. Pretorius met the British commissioners near the Sand River. On 17 January 1852 they concluded the convention by which the independence of the Transvaal Boers was recognized by Britain.

Pretorius recrossed the Vaal River, and on 16 March he reconciled with Potgieter at Rustenburg. The followers of both leaders approved the convention, although the Potgieter party was not represented. In the same year, Pretorius paid a visit to Durban with the object of opening up trade between Natal and the new republic. In 1852, he also attempted to close the road to the interior through Bechuanaland and sent a commando to the western border against Sechele.

Pretorius died at his home at Magaliesberg in July 1853. He is described by Theal as "the ablest leader and most perfect representative of the Emigrant Farmers." In 1855, a new district and a new town were formed out of the Potchefstroom and Rustenburg districts by his son, Marthinus Wessel Pretorius, who named them Pretoria in honor of the late commandant-general. Marthinus Wessel Pretorius was the first president of the Transvaal Republic.

== See also ==
- Battle of Congella
- Battle of Blood River
