= Gerrit Maritz =

Afrikaner pioneer and leader (1797–1838)

Gerhardus Martinus Maritz
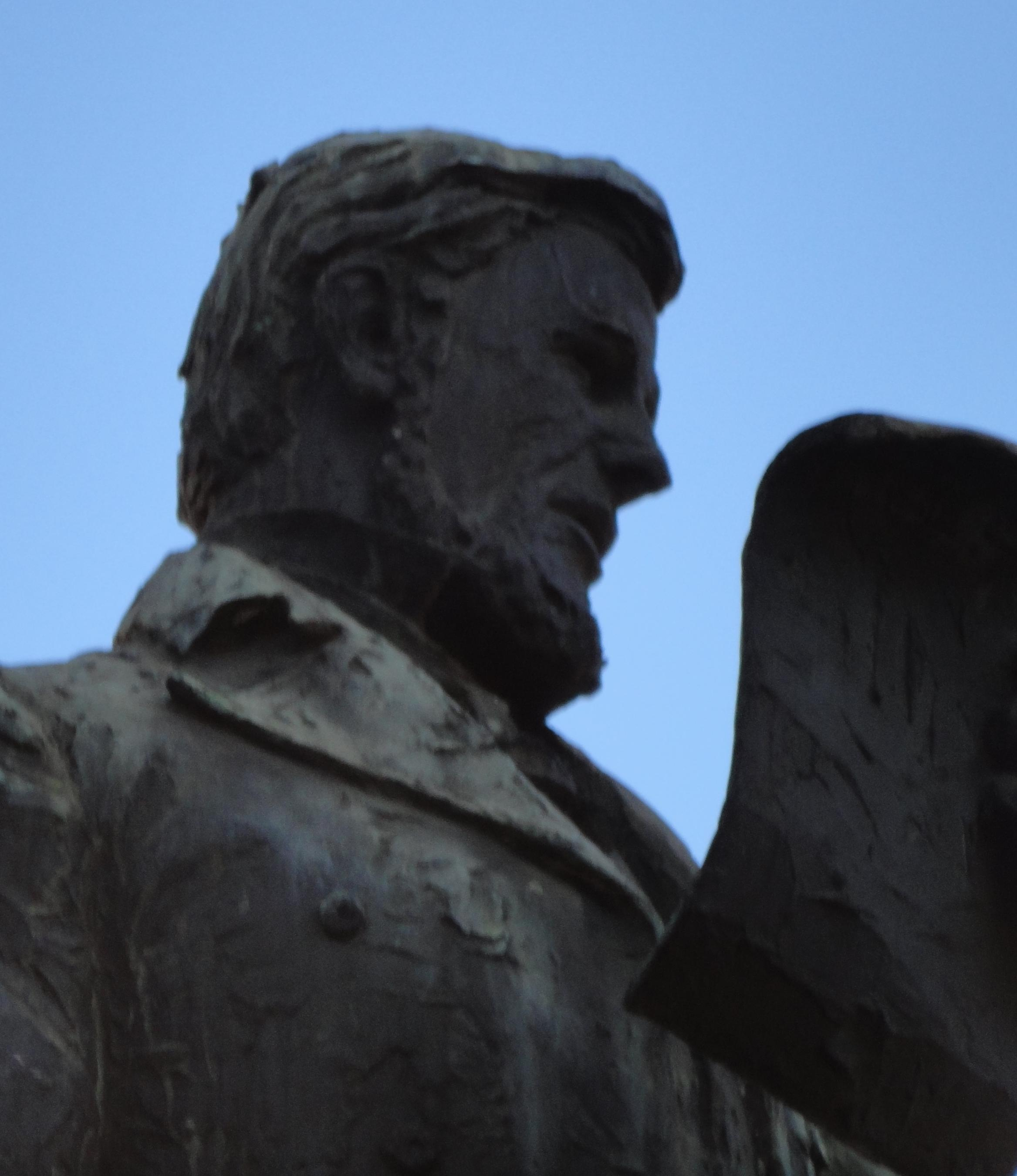
- The statue of Gerrit Maritz by sculptor Jo Roos (1926–2010)
- Born: 1 March 1797
- Died: 23 September 1838 (aged 41); Sooilaer (Maritzdam), Klein-Tugela river
- Resting place: Reburied near Blaauwkranz monument 28°51′02″S 29°50′34″E
- Occupations: Ward master, provisional Field cornet, wagon builder
- Known for: Voortrekker leader
- Spouse: Angenitha Maria Olivier
- Children: Salamo Stephanus; Cornelis Johannes Francois; Debora Susanna Sophia; Gerhardus Jacobus; Johannes Stephanus; Maria Magdalena
- Parent(s): Salamo Maritz (c.1769-1828), Maria Elisabeth Oosthuijsen (1777–1846)

Gerhardus Marthinus (Gert or Gerrit) Maritz (1 March 1797 – 23 September 1838), was a Voortrekker pioneer and leader, wagon builder.

Gerrit Maritz was the son of Salamo Stefanus Maritz and Maria Elizabeth Oosthuizen. He married Agnita Maria Olivier and later Anna Carolina Agatha van Rooyen and from them he fathered six children.

== See also ==
- Graaff-Reinet: Gerrit Maritz, Great Trek Leader after whom Pietermaritzburg was partly named was a wagon-maker in the town.
- Pietermaritzburg: There exist two interpretations about the origin of the city's name. One is that it was named after Piet Retief and Gerrit Maritz, two famous Voortrekker leaders.

== Sources ==
- Bulpin, Thomas Victor; Krüger, Daniel Wilhelmus (1976). The Great Trek. Round the world histories. Vol. 33 (2 ed.). Hulton. p. 52.
- Room, Adrian (2006). Placenames of the world: origins and meanings of the names for 6,600 countries, cities, territories, natural features, and historic sites (2 ed.). McFarland. p. 295. ISBN 0-7864-2248-3.
- Thom, H.B. (1947). Die Lewe van Gert Maritz. Cape Town: Nasionale Pers, Beperk. p. 284.
