= Thomas Halstead =

English trader

Thomas Halstead or Holstead (c. 1811 – 6 February 1838) was an English trader who worked as an interpreter for Shaka Zulu as well as Dingane until 1838. He was an associate of the Biggar family and was killed with Piet Retief and approximately 100 other men on KwaMatiwane, hill of execution, within sight of Dingane's stronghold, Umgungundglovu, between Melmoth and Vryheid. Halstead was a descendant of the British Settlers.

He appears as a character in the H. Rider Haggard novel Marie.

== Halstead’s fate ==
Credo Mutwa puts all the blame for the murder of Retief and his men on the shoulders of the youthful Thomas Halstead, who accompanied the Voortrekkers as interpreter. According to Mutwa, Halstead was known by the Zulu as the “Curious Peeper”. On the evening before the murder Halstead is said to have peered over the fence of the royal harem. One of Dingane’s wives, who was pregnant, saw him and was so frightened that she suffered a miscarriage. According to Zulu law it was a crime punishable by death for any man to approach the vicinity of the royal harem. Mutwa writes that Dingane was beginning to harbour thoughts that his white visitors had vile intentions, as one could expect from wizards, and were targeting his wives. That was why he had them murdered and why he shouted "“Kill the wizards".

According to Wood, Halstead was sitting among the Voortrekkers when the dancing Zulu attacked. He called out: "We are done for!" He added in the Zulu language: "Let me talk to the King!" Dingane heard this but rejected his request with a wave of his hand. Halstead thereupon pulled out his knife, cut open one assailant and slit another’s throat before he was overpowered.

Mutwa's allegation regarding Halstead is probably untrue. The messenger that Dingane sent to Owen to inform him that he was going to kill Retief and his men specifically added that the interpreter of the Voortrekkers, an English-speaking man from Port Natal [Thomas Halstead], would not be killed.

Three days after the massacre Owen wrote in his diary that Dingane himself had told Hulley that Halstead, who was sitting with the Voortrekkers, was killed against the wishes of the Zulu king; that he was accidentally killed in the confusion. According to a remark that Owen made in his diary one day after the massacre, Dingane informed the missionary Venable that he gave orders that Halstead should not be murdered, but that his warriors did not recognise Halstead in the midst of the Voortrekkers. Owen also added that it was Dingane’s custom to blame his subjects when he did something of which he felt ashamed. Hulley also referred to the fate of Halstead in his report. He recorded that he asked Dingane a few days after the massacre about why Halstead had been killed. According to him the Zulu king replied: "He is dead. In the mayhem of the massacre he was killed with the others. I am sorry about it. I did not mean to take his life."
