= Biggar family =

South African settlers at Port Natal (1781-1838)

The Biggar family, Alexander Harvey Biggar (29 October 1781 – 27 December 1838) and his two sons Robert (12 September 1813 – 17 April 1838) and George (20 February 1820 – 17 February 1838), were pioneer traders at Port Natal, in what was to become the Colony of Natal. Subsequent to the massacre of Retief's delegation, they became involved in the exchange of attacks between Zulus and settlers. Although contributing to the overthrow of Dingane, all three lost their lives in the conflicts of 1838. Alexander's grandson John Dunn became a well-known Natal pioneer in his own right.

== Early life ==
Alexander was born in Kinsale, Ireland in 1781, to parents (Major) Harold Robert Biggar and Ann, née Harvey. On 3 March 1799, he married Mary Straton (1781–1855) in Brechin, Scotland. Alexander first worked as paymaster for the 85th regiment, before fighting in the Napoleonic Wars of 1803–1815, and the War of 1812 in North America. His highest rank was Captain, but he was found guilty of embezzling £1,300 from War Office Funds and was discharged from service after repaying the money.

== South Africa ==
He emigrated to the Cape Colony along with other 1820 Settlers. Alexander paid deposits for 13 other settler families who were indentured to him for three years and would receive 20 acres (81,000 m^{2}) of land which they could cultivate on weekends, and receive title after three years. Despite their signed Article of Agreement, by July 1820 all except George Pollard had deserted him or applied for release from their contracts.

Biggar's family, which now included nine daughters and a son, Robert, departed from Portsmouth on HMS Weymouth on 20 January 1820, arriving in Algoa Bay on 15 May 1820. His younger son George was born during the voyage. The family was allotted the Woodlands farm, near Bathurst on 6 September 1826. Ten years later, in May 1836, Alexander moved to the frontier trading centre of Port Natal, in the later Colony of Natal, initially with his younger son George. Once there, he founded the Port Natal Volunteers in 1837, the first white military group of the region, though they almost immediately disbanded. Alexander had 13 children in total. This included a son by a Zulu woman, as was the practice among Englishmen in the fledgling settler community.

== George dies in massacre ==
In February 1838 Alexander's youngest son of 18 years, George, was 120 miles (190 km) inland at the Blaauwekrans camp of the Voortrekkers. When news reached Port Natal that the Zulus had exterminated Piet Retief's delegation, Alexander sent Dick King to warn George and others at the Voortrekker camps. Dick King departed immediately on foot, accompanied by some natives. Despite covering the distance in four days by walking day and night, they arrived just after the Rensburg voortrekker camp was attacked. They reached the vicinity of the next camp, near present-day Estcourt, just as the attack on it started on 17 February 1838. Though cut off from Gerrit Maritz's laager, Dick King participated in its defence, but was unable to prevent the death of George, who was further inland.

== Robert's fateful retaliation ==
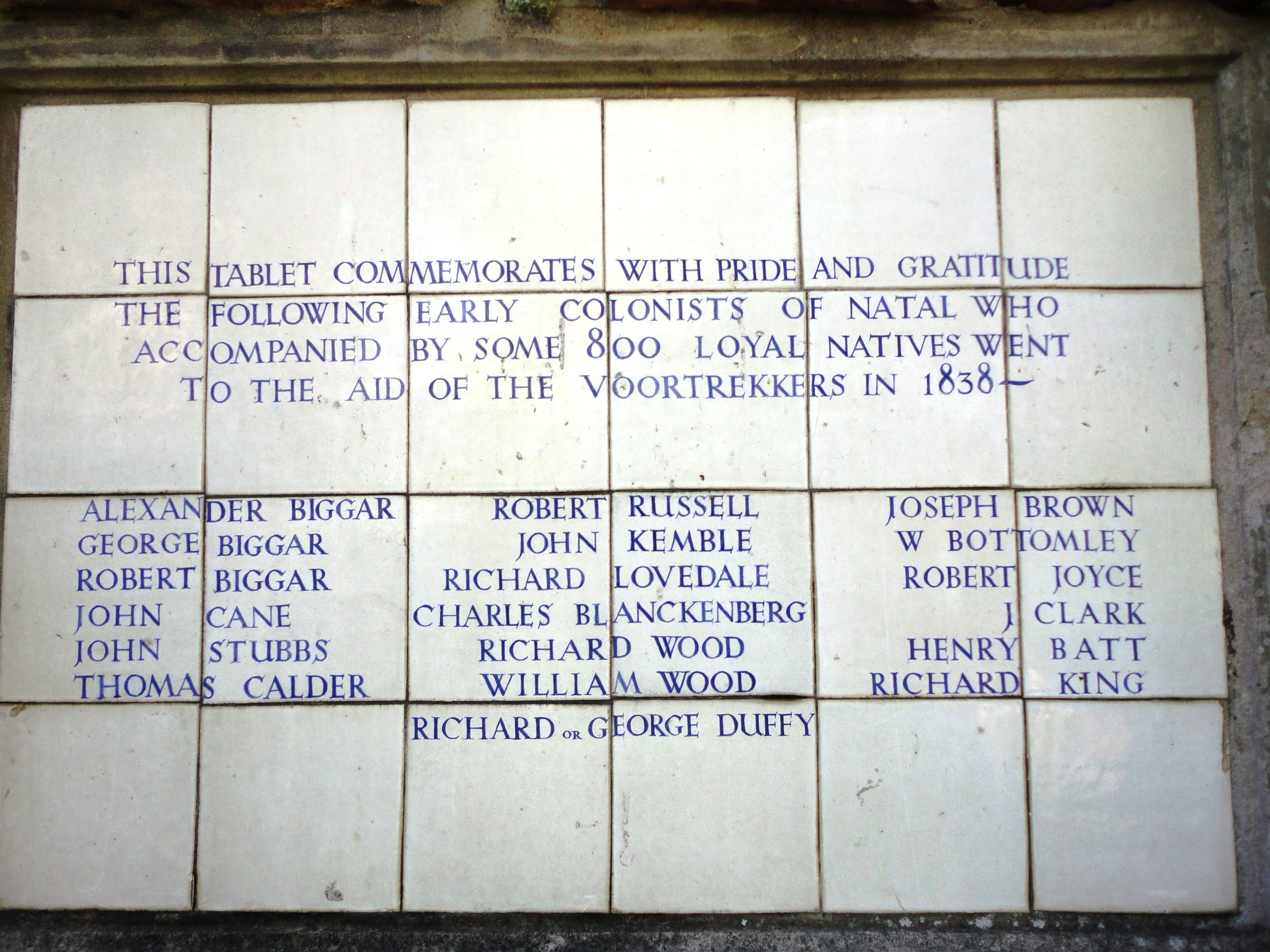
A sign commemorating the Biggar expeditions, at the Old Fort, Durban

The traders at Port Natal were determined to make a diversion in the victims' favor. Two Britons from Port Natal, George Biggar and Thomas Halstead, were among those already killed at Blaauwekrans and Dingane's kraal respectively.

Some 20 to 30 European men, including Dick King, were placed under Robert's command on 13 April 1838. With a following of 1,500 Zulus who deserted from Dingane, they crossed the Tugela river near its mouth and proceeded to uMgungundlovu. Four days later they were able to take 7,000 head of cattle from a group of Zulus who fled. The party returned with these cattle to the bay, and discovered that a spy of Dingane had been found and killed there in their absence.

Once again they set off to Dingane's kraal and reached Ndondakusuka village north of the Tugela on 17 April 1838. This kraal, built on high-lying ground, belonged to a captain of Dingane, named Zulu. Here, while questioning a captive, likely a decoy, they were closed in by a strong Zulu force under the command of Dingane's brother Mpande and his general Nongalaza. The British soon found that retreat was impossible, and blundered by dividing their force to oppose their encirclement. The Zulus made a successful dash to split the forces in two. The British force was overwhelmed in the desperate aftermath, and Robert died with his comrades. Only Dick King, Richard (or George) Duffy, Joseph Brown, Robert Joyce and about 500 Zulus escaped to the bay.

Pursued by the Zulu force, all European inhabitants of Port Natal took up refuge for nine days on the Comet, a British vessel which happened to lie on anchor in the bay. When the Zulus retired, only Alexander Biggar, Dick King and some six or seven others returned to live at the port. Alexander's daughter, Ann Dunn and her children departed with the Comet, joining the missionaries, hunters and other traders who returned to the Cape.

== Alexander assists the Wenkommando ==
The Voortrekker commando assembled to retaliate against Dingane was named the Wenkommando (Dutch: victory commando). Alexander, having lost both sons, joined this commando led by Andries Pretorius, assisted by a hundred (some say seventy) black servants. On 16 December 1838, Alexander participated in the Battle of Blood River where no life was lost on the Voortrekker side. Their Wenkommando proceeded to uMgungundlovu, where a roll call recorded Alexander as one of those present. The commando then laagered at Mthonjaneni to the south, from where, on 27 December, Alexander joined Hans de Lange in search of Dingane's hidden cattle. The party was led down the Opathe gorge 28°27′06″S 31°19′07″E by a Zulu decoy, and could hardly escape encirclement when they were ambushed. Alexander was on his horse and it is claimed that he could have escaped, but stayed with his amaCele. He died at age 57 alongside five Voortrekkers and some of his servants.

== Biggars Mountain ==
While travelling with the Voortrekkers, Alexander's servants overturned his cart. Due to the accident, the mountain where it happened, Heuningberg, was renamed Biggarsberg, or Biggars Mountain, as it is still known today.
