= Nongalaza KaNondela =

- Born: c. 1805
- Died: after 1856
- Allegiance: Zulu Kingdom
- Branch: Zulu army
- Rank: Military commander
- Commands: Forces of Mpande
- Known for: Principal military commander of King Mpande
- Conflicts: Battle of Maqongqo; Battle of Ndondakusuka

Nongalaza KaNondela (c. 1805 – after 1856) was a Zulu warrior who was the principal military commander of King Mpande of the Zulu Kingdom.

== History ==
When Mpande was chieftain of the Nyandwini clan, Nongalaza commanded his forces against the invasion by Robert Biggar and rebel Zulus, successfully destroying them at the Tugela River in 1838. In 1840, Mpande allied with the Boers and moved against his brother Dingane in a bid for the Zulu throne. Nongalaza led Mpande's main army, while Mpande took a separate route towards Dingane with a force of Boers under Andries Pretorius. Nongalaza encountered Dingane's army before the Boers arrived, and decided to attack immediately. At the Battle of Maqongqo Nongalaza crushed Dingane, and when Mpande arrived he was installed as king.

Under Mpande's rule, Nongalaza continued to enjoy the king's support, and was enriched with land and cattle. The trader and hunter William Clayton Humphreys reported that Nongalaza was "exceedingly kind" to him during his trip into Zululand in 1851.

In 1856, a civil war broke out between Cetshwayo and Mbuyazi, the king's two oldest sons. Cetshwayo was supported by most of the territorial sub-chiefs, but Mpande favoured his younger son Mbuyazi. Nongalaza joined Mbuyazi. At the Battle of Ndondakusuka Mbuyazi was defeated, and Cetshwayo massacred almost all his followers, including five of his brothers. Nongalaza barely escaped by diving into the Tugela River and swimming to safety.
