= Battle of Congella =

1842 British victory over Boers in the Great Trek

Coordinates: 29°51′04″S 31°01′34″E

- Part of the Great Trek
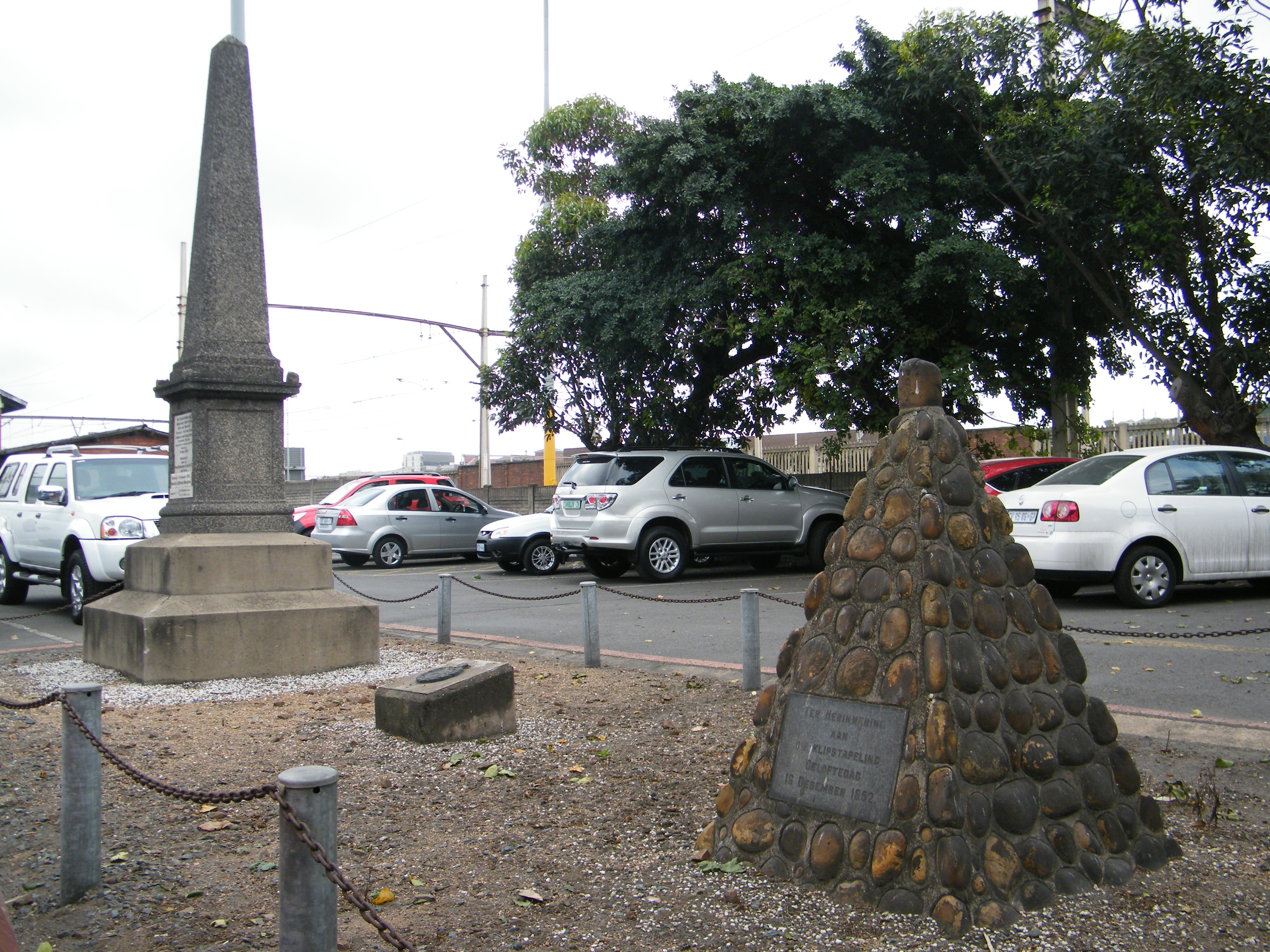
- Congella battlefield memorials
| Date | 23 May 1842 |
| Location | Port Natal later known as Durban, KwaZulu-Natal, South Africa |
| Result | British victory |

Belligerents
| Natalia Republic | (United Kingdom) British Empire |

Commanders and leaders
| Andries Pretorius | Captain Thomas Charlton Smith |

Strength
| Unknown | 134 |

Casualties and losses
| Unknown | 19 killed 29 wounded 1 missing |

The Battle of Congella, beginning 23 May 1842, was between the British of the Cape colony and Voortrekkers or the Boer forces of the Natalia Republic. The Republic of Natalia sought an independent port of entry, free from British control and thus sought to conquer the Port Natal trading settlement which had been settled by mostly British merchants in modern-day KwaZulu-Natal. The battle ended in a British victory due to the heroic ride of Dick King for reinforcements.

== Background ==
In the early 1820s, a small group of British traders and hunters established a settlement at Port Natal, in present-day Durban, on the southeastern coast of South Africa. These settlers, often referred to as the "Port Natal traders," sought to engage in commerce with the powerful Zulu Kingdom under Shaka Zulu. Despite their remote location, they requested formal recognition and protection from the British Cape Colony, but the Cape Government initially declined to annex the area. As a result, the settlers operated independently, developing cooperative—though sometimes tense—relations with the Zulu leadership and laying the foundation for future British colonial expansion in the region.

However, the Afrikaner Boers, who had recently left the Cape Colony in the mass exodus called the Great Trek, had ventured over the Drakensberg mountains, settled in the area they named the Natalia Republic and resumed their farming lifestyles. The Zulu people naturally had misgivings about the intentions of the newcomers and war followed soon afterward. Eventually the Cape Government heard news of the Boer republic and the subsequent attacks on white people in Port Natal, and how these attacks were approaching the Cape Colony. The Governor of the Cape, Benjamin d'Urban (the settlement of Port Natal was later named Durban in his honour), sent a regiment to take possession of Natal from the Boers and to settle the Zulu attacks. It was, however, D'Urban's successor, George Thomas Napier, who dispatched Captain Thomas Charlton Smith (who had served at the Battle of Waterloo).

== Clash between Dutch (Boer) and British forces ==
Captain Smith arrived and settled in Port Natal on 4 May 1842, contrary to the vehement demands from the Boers that the British should leave. Smith decided to attack the Boers before they could arrange the support they were expecting. At midnight on the evening of 23 and 24 May, the British forces, including the 1st Battalion, Royal Inniskilling Fusiliers, attacked the well-defended village of "Kongela". The attack failed dismally, and the official history of the Regiment relates the story effectively:

For a time all went well. Not a Boer was seen: not a shot [was] fired, until, half a mile from their objective, they had to skirt a dense thicket of mango-bush, which proved to be held by an advance party of burghers who opened a heavy fire upon them. This fire the Inniskillings returned, but with nothing to aim at except the flashes from the scrub, while, as they stood up in the bright moonlight to reload, they offered the Boers a target such as every marksman dreams of but very seldom sees. When the guns lumbered into action their projectiles checked the Boer musketry but only for a moment and, when the enemy's bullets began to find their billets among the oxen, the beasts broke loose, upset the limbers, dashed among the soldiers and threw them into confusion... The moment the Boers had silenced the light guns they turned their musketry again upon the infantry who fell so fast that Charlton Smith realised that the attack had failed and retired, pursued by the burghers who for two or three hours fired hotly into his camp . . . In the retreat he was forced to leave behind him the two light guns and sixteen dead, also thirty-one wounded men. Three more men were drowned in crossing a river: this disastrous night attack caused fifty casualties, or nearly thirty-six per cent of the one hundred and thirty-nine combatants who took part in it. Three officers fell: Lieutenant Wyatt, R.A., was shot dead, Captain J. F. Lonsdale and Lieut. B. Tunnard were severely wounded. The latter had an extraordinary escape. He was hard hit in the thigh and, in the retreat, collapsed into the river. In the confusion his fall was unnoticed and he was reported missing until next day, when he was brought up to the camp by some Good Samaritans who had found his apparently lifeless body stranded on the bank.

— History of the Royal Inniskilling Fusiliers 1928

== Siege of British camp ==
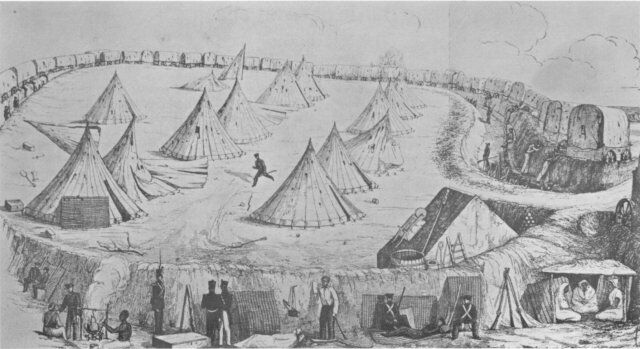
The camp under siege

The Boers had won a major battle, and Captain Smith had lost many of his men. Smith realised he needed to urgently request reinforcements from the Cape Colony, which was six hundred kilometers of untamed wilderness away. An English trader known as Dick King and colonist volunteered to alert the colony by riding on horseback to Grahamstown. Slipping through the Boers under the cover of night, King and his native assistant escaped and began their seemingly impossible mission. The history of the Regiment continues:

The Boers lost no time in following up their first success. A sergeant and twenty men of the Regiment were guarding an eighteen-pounder gun and a quantity of stores which had recently arrived in Cape Colony. Two of these guns had been landed but luckily one had been dragged safely into camp before dawn on 26 May when a hundred burghers stalked the party and from cover poured so heavy a fire upon them that the sergeant was forced to surrender, but not before five of his men were killed or wounded. By this fresh mishap twenty-one combatants, a valuable gun and an equally valuable supply of provisions were lost. To make good his deficiencies in food, Charlton Smith made forced requisitions among the non-combatant inhabitants of the settlement who, though they professed loyalty to the British flag, protested loudly at this procedure. Captain Smith now saw that it was time to call in [his] outposts and concentrated the remnant of his command in the camp which he had fortified as well as his limited resources would allow...

— History of the Royal Inniskilling Fusiliers 1928

The history continues, saying that the Boers extended a flag of truce proposing that the women and children should be removed from the rustic fort to safety aboard the schooner Mazeppa which was then in port. This chivalrous offer was accepted and 28 people were sent to safety aboard the vessel. Captain Lonsdale described the Boers attacks in a letter to his mother in England:

I was lying in my tent . . . down with fever. We were doing all we could to fortify the camp... Just before sunrise we were saluted by a six-pound shot which passed through the officer's mess tent, knocking their kettles and cooking apparatus in all directions. Everyone, of course, went to his station in the ditch, and the Boers then kept up an incessant fire from four pieces of artillery and small arms, never ceasing for a moment during the whole day till sunset. During the whole day Margaret and Janet [Capt Lonsdale's wife and daughter], were lying on the ground in the tent, close by me. James (Note: James, his son, eventually became Mayor of King Williamstown, in which his name is perpetuated in a national monument. Capt. Lonsdale settled in King Williamstown after buying himself out [of] the Army shortly after these events.) ... was lying in my other tent on the ground, with his legs on the legs of a table, when a six-pound shot cut off the table legs just above him, and the splinters struck him in the face. When the attack was over, the officers came to our tents, expecting to find us all dead. I said if they attacked us the next morning we should all have to go into the trench. Margaret then got up and put on a few things, and assisted me in putting on something. I had scarcely got on my trousers when we were again attacked. Margaret and the children ran immediately to the trench, and I was carried into it, and we all lay down or sat up. The fire continued all day, as on the day before. About the middle of the day the children were getting very hungry. Janet said there was a bone of beef in the tent, and she would go for it; but we did not wish her, as she might have been shot; but before I knew much about it she was back with the bone. We all slept in the trench this night. Next morning we were awakened by a shot from one of the great guns passing just over our heads. Shortly after a flag of truce came in, and Margaret and the children went on board the Mazeppa in such a hurry that they had not a change of clothes.

— History of the Royal Inniskilling Fusiliers 1928

== Lifting of siege ==
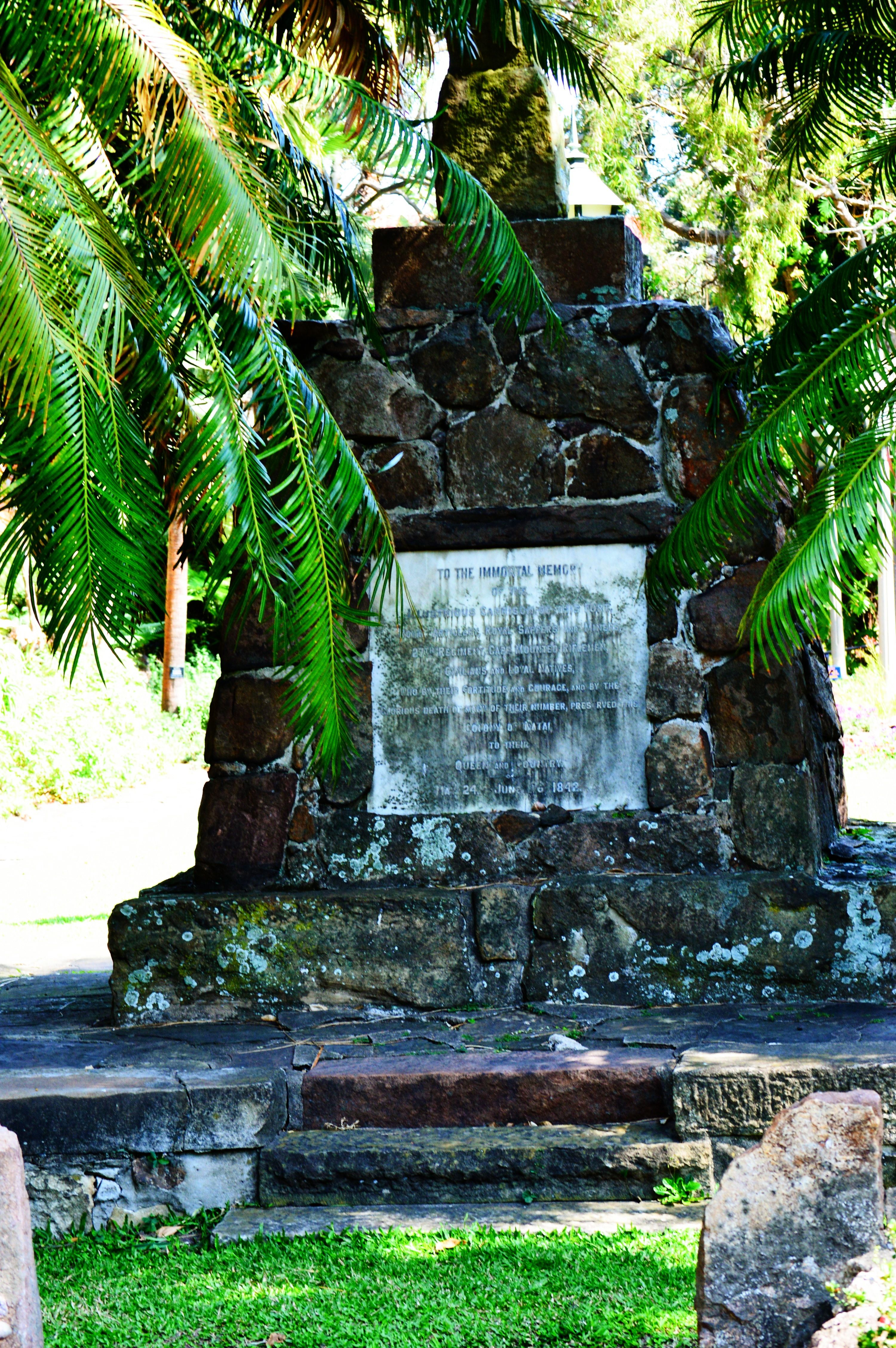
Memorial to the defenders of the British camp, Old Fort, Durban

Dick King made the famous horseback journey of 960 kilometers in fourteen days, ten days quicker than the normal journey's length and reinforcements were immediately sent. Thirty one days after Captain Smith recruited King, the reinforcements arrived at Port Natal by ship, aboard the Conch and the South Hampton. The reinforcements relieved Captain Smith and the surrounding Boers soon dispersed. The Mazeppa was brought back (it sailed to Delagoa Bay to escape the fighting) and the women and children safely returned.
