= Umkhosi =

Umkhosi is a Zulu word for "festival" and may refer to:

- Umkhosi Wokweshwama, first fruits festival
- Umkhosi woMhlanga, reed dance festival
