= Francis Owen =

Francis Owen may refer to:

- Francis Owen (missionary) (1802–1854), English missionary
- Francis Owen (politician) (1745–1774), British politician
- Francis Owen (philologist) (1886–1975), Canadian philologist and military officer
