= Umgungundlovu =

Umgungundlovu may refer to:

- uMgungundlovu, king Dingane's 19th century royal kraal in northern KwaZulu-Natal
- Umgungundlovu District Municipality, a district in southern KwaZulu-Natal
