= Biggarsberg =

Hills in South Africa

Coordinates: 28°15′22″S 29°58′09″E

Biggarsberg is a series of hills in KwaZulu-Natal, South Africa, stretching south of Glencoe and Dundee in a north western/south eastern direction. It is named for Alexander Biggar.
