= Hlathikhulu Forest Reserve =

Forest in South Africa

- Location: South Africa
- Coordinates: 27°20′29″S 32°0′1″E
- Hlathikhulu Forest Reserve (South Africa) Hlathikhulu Forest Reserve (KwaZulu-Natal)

Hlathikulu Forest is a coastal scarp forest in the Lebombo Mountains of South Africa, between Ingwavuma and the Pongola Gorge. The forest is also known as the Gwaliweni Forest. The forest is part of the IUCN's Maputaland Centre of Plant Endemism

== History ==
It is the site of the murder of the Zulu King Dingane by Zulu Nyawo, iNkosi Sambane of the Nyawo Royal House and Nondawana. After being stabbed to death, Dingane was buried beneath a large fig tree at his residence at eSankoleni. Three large stones were used to mark the grave.

In 1948, the forest was proclaimed as the Hlatikulu Forest Reserve. In 1987, while under the jurisdiction of the KwaZulu bantustan, it was renamed to Hlathikhulu Nature Reserve. On 7 March 2013, it was formally declared as a nature reserve: Hlathikhulu Forest Reserve Nature Reserve.

== Biodiversity ==
Bird species recorded here include the lemon dove (Aplopelia larvata), trumpeter hornbill (Bycanistes bucinator), olive woodpecker (Dendropicos griseocephalus), pink-throated twinspot (Hypargos margaritatus), Livingstone's turaco (Tauraco livingstonii) and African crowned eagle (Stephanoaetus coronatus).

Tree species found here include the Lebombo ironwood (Androstachys johnsonii) and Lebombo krantz ash (Atalaya alata).

== See also ==
- Forests of KwaZulu-Natal
