= Francis Owen (missionary) =

First English missionary to the Zulu kingdom

Francis Owen was the first English missionary to the Zulu kingdom, then ruled by King Dingane. He and his household were the only white witnesses to the massacre of Piet Retief and his approximate 80 followers in February 1838 in the Zulu capital of Umgungundlovu. He is also the only European to leave a detailed account of life in the Zulu court and travelling through Natal at that time.

== Background ==
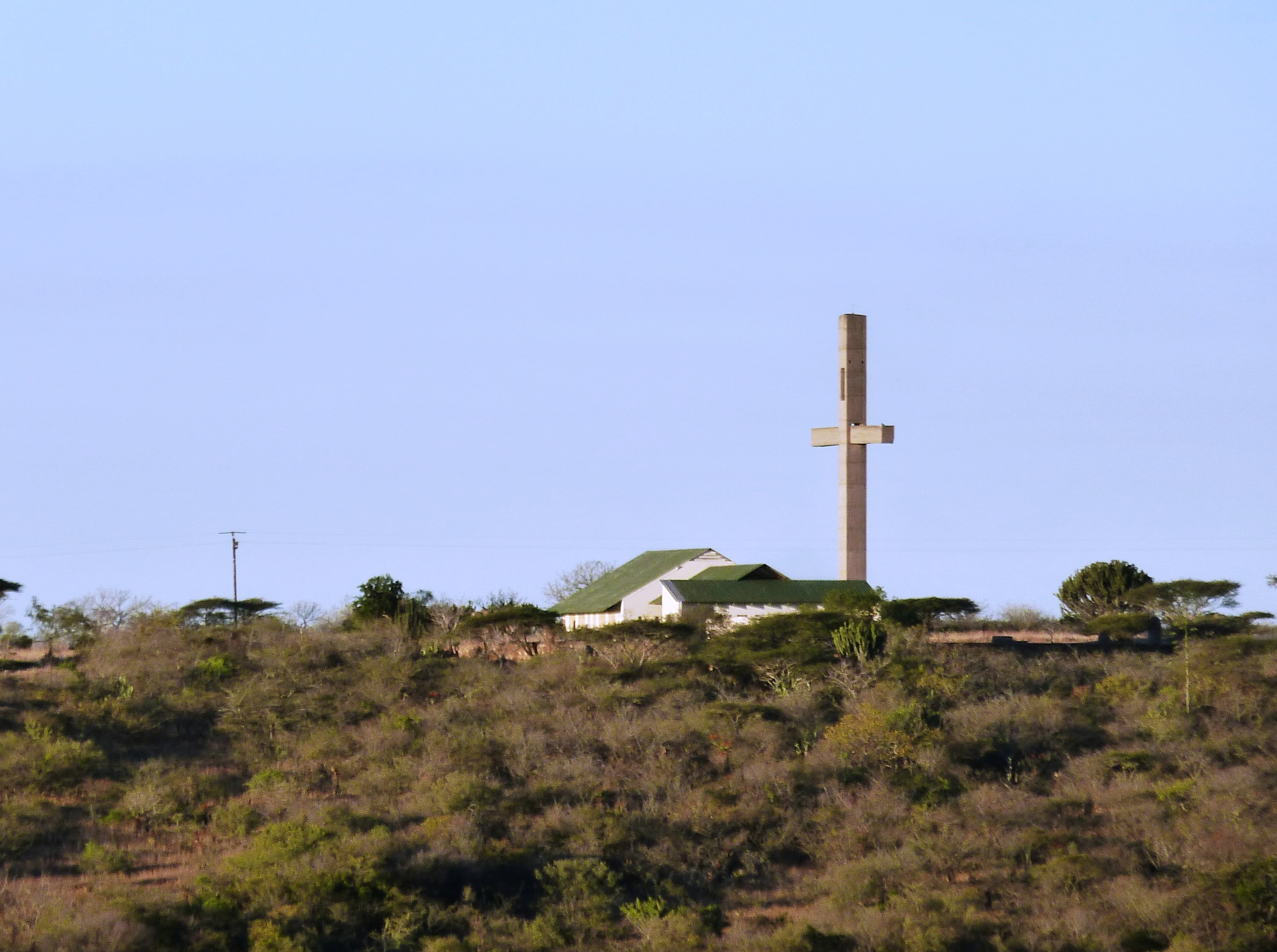
The Dutch Reformed mission station on Hlomo amabutho, the site of Owen's camp at Umgungundlovu. The concrete cross is a bell tower, all that remains of a 1969 church building that was torched during political unrest in the 1980s.

Owen was born in Chelsea, London, in 1802. In 1836 was a vicar in Normanton, West Yorkshire when he attended a lecture given by a retired naval captain, Allen Francis Gardiner, who was seeking a missionary to convert the Zulu people to Christianity. Owen agreed to help and travelled to South Africa in 1837 with his wife (Sarah Pennington Owen), daughter (name not known), sister Mary, (who later became a botanist in South Africa) and a maidservant called Jane Williams, later Jane Bird.

Owen's mission was not a success. Dingane was deeply suspicious of the Christian teaching and the journal includes accounts of his many interrogations of Christian beliefs. Owen found many local practices strange and brutal compared to life in Yorkshire and viewed the Zulu King as a barbarian and a tyrant. Owen's belief, expressed in his journal and common amongst missionaries at the time, was that anyone not baptised in the church was bound for eternal damnation. This attitude only changed in South Africa in the 1860's with the preachings of John Colenso.

When Retief's party arrived in the Zulu capital in February 1838, Owen was invited by the king to help draw up a written agreement for the allocation of some Zulu land for Retief and his Boer settlers. This was done with the help of a twelve-year-old boy called William Woods who could speak both Zulu and English. As the settlers prepared to leave, Dingane invited them to a farewell celebration where he had them all killed. The description of the massacre provided by Owen is largely aligned with that of Woods who wrote his account several years later and the oral record passed down by Zulu witnesses. The agreement drafted by Owen was later found in a leather satchel beside Retief's remains.

Dingane sent assurances to Owen that he and the British people staying in his mission would not be killed, but the king was not trusted. It is possible that they survived through a deliberate misinterpretation. In his journal, Owen records that when asked by Dingane's representative whether he approved of the killing of Retief's men, he replied that he could not condone such an action. However, in Woods later account of the meeting he confessed that he had reported Owen's response as agreeing that such killing was necessary. After several further tense interviews with the king, they were finally able to leave his capital for Port Natal (Durban).

In March and April 1838 approximately fifteen hundred rebel Zulu warriors and seventeen British settlers from Port Natal joined the Boers in attacking the forces of Dingane. Owen and Woods did not take part in the attacks although William Woods' father and uncle were among the thirteen British settlers and about five hundred rebel Zulus killed and are listed on a memorial in the old fort at Durban. The Owens, Woods junior and his mother were still in Port Natal when Dingane sent a retaliatory force to destroy the town. Fortunately, a ship called the Comet, had just anchored in the bay and they were able to take shelter aboard.

Owen left the Church Missionary Society and returned to England in 1841. In 1844 he became the second vicar of St Thomas' Crookes Church in Sheffield. He served there for nearly ten years before taking a tour of the Holy Land. As he embarked for home he caught ‘Syrian fever’ and died in Alexandria on 14 November 1854, aged 52. There is a memorial to him in this church.

In 1857, his wife remarried another clergyman, John Livesey. She died in 1863, aged 54.

== Literary references ==
Owen and his family appear as characters in the book Flashman and the Zulus by Robert Brightwell. Owen also appears in H. Rider Haggard's book "Marie".
