= United African Apostolic Church =

- Country: South Africa
- Denomination: Pentecostal
- Website: www.uaac.church

History
- Former name: Dzivha La Mudzimu
- Founded: 1912
- Founder: Bishop Matsea Paulos Mureri

The United African Apostolic Church is a South African church. Its headquarters is situated in Ha-Mavhunga, a village in the Nzhelele Valley in the province of Limpopo. It is a Pentecostal church that has developed from Pentecostal missionary origins with African beliefs to a synchretic African initiated church. With 1.5 million members it is considered to be the second largest of such churches in South Africa. The church was founded by Bishop Matsea Paulos Mureri in 1912. The late Bishop Matsea Paulos Mureri had traveled to South Africa as part of a Pentecostal mission called the Apostolic Faith Mission. Some of the other missionaries returned to their home countries, but Bishop Matsea Paulos Mureri remained and formed a church called DZIVHA LA MUDZIMU. The name of this church was changed to United African Apostolic Church in 1918. The slogan of the church is "Sea of the World".Archbishop IJ Mureri is the leader. He ascended the throne as the first born of the late Archbishop Dr EMM Mureri, who led the church for 40 years. This practice has a long history since the death of the founder, Bishop Matsea Paul Mureri in 1975 who was followed by his first born son, Bishop Jeremiah Mureri. Bishop Jeremiah Mureri was also followed by his first born son, Archbishop Dr EMM Mureri, who is now being followed by his first born son.

Archbishop IJ Mureri was officially appointed by the Matriach of the Mureri family, Vho-Makhadzi, on 20 January 2020. This was done in accordance with the church constitution which stipulates that a UAAC leader is appointed from the descendants of the Mureri family by virtue of consanguinity and also having been determined by the church Senate.

The above was cemented by the official robing ceremony held on 24 April 2021 at the Headquarters which was also presided over by Vho-Makhadzi, sisters to his father.

He is well revered by the general UAAC membership, both in South Africa and other countries such as Zimbabwe, Botswana and Zambia.

He is poised to propel the church to greater heights, having worked in the Youth structures since the 90s.

The church has no relation to the United Apostolic Church of Europe or the Apostolic Church of South Africa - Apostle Unity, which derived from other roots.

== Sources ==
- https://www.uaac.church - United African Apostolic Church website
- http://www.info.gov.za - South African government information
