= First Fruits (Southern Africa) =

Festivals of the Nguni peoples

The First Fruits festivals of the Nguni peoples in Southern Africa are a type of sacrificial ceremony of giving the first fruits in a harvest to God believed to be responsible for the abundance of food. It was performed by the high priests of the kingdom, and the king was always in attendance. Traditionally, it marked a time of prosperity in the good harvests experienced after the seasonal agricultural period.

It also brought the nation together, unifying it at a time of merrymaking and quashing fears of famine. The tradition is still practiced mainly in the kingdoms of KwaZulu-Natal and Eswatini. The ceremonies are headed by the kings of the tribes: Mswati III in Eswatini, celebrated as Incwala, and King Goodwill Zwelithini of the Zulu nation, celebrated as Umkhosi Wokweshwama.
