= Umkhosi Wokweshwama =

Zulu annual harvest festival

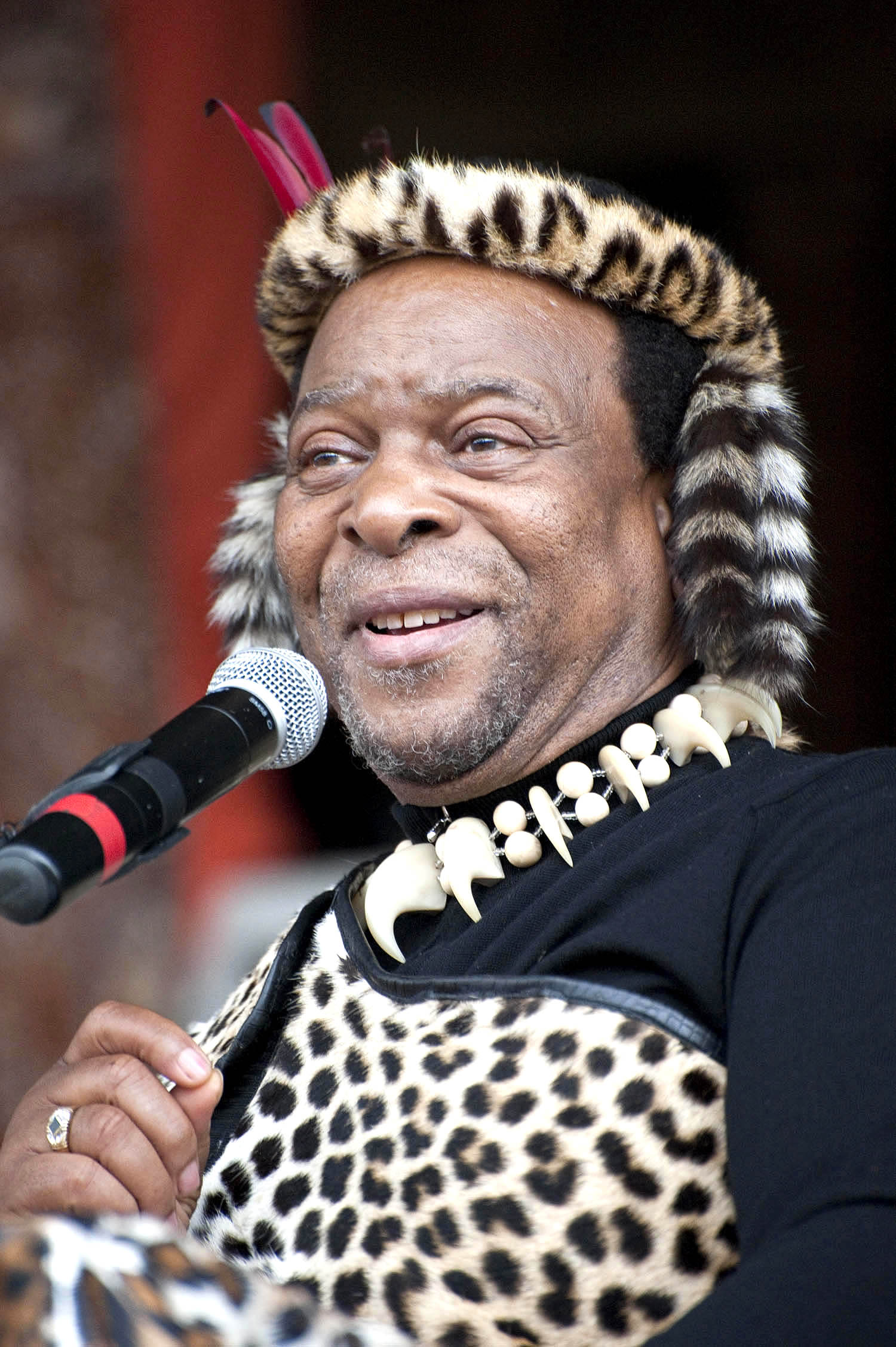
Goodwill Zwelithini kaBhekuzulu revived the festival in 1990.

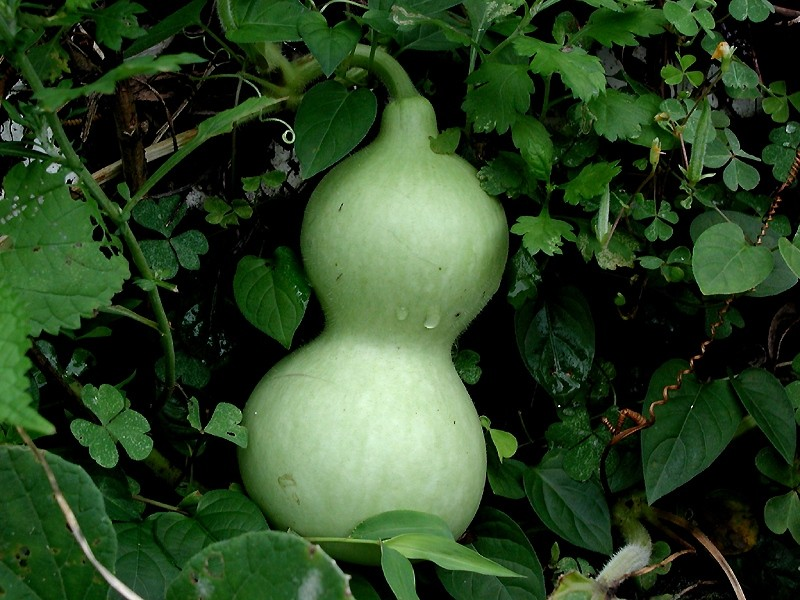
The dashing of a calabash by the Zulu King signifies that the people may now enjoy the fruits of the harvest.

Umkhosi Wokweshwama [um̩kʰoːsi woɠʷeʃʷaːma] ("first fruits festival"), recently also known as Umkhosi Woselwa [um̩kʰoːsi woseːlʷa] ("calabash festival"), is the annual harvest festival of the Zulu people, observed around the December solstice. It takes place at the Enyokeni Royal Palace in Nongoma, KwaZulu-Natal, and is presided over by the Zulu King, who conducts a tasting ceremony as sacred king, closed by the dashing of a calabash to signify that the people may now enjoy the fruits of the harvest; this role was historically expanded by Shaka to have more military significance with a muster and parade. It was revived by the current king's father, the late King Goodwill Zwelithini kaBhekuzulu in 1990, after a ban by British colonial authorities following the 1879 Battle of Isandlwana and Zulu defeat in the Anglo-Zulu War (the last was held in winter 1877–78, though some claim continuity as a less elaborate event).

== Participation And Controversy ==
The festival has mass participation by young men, as Umkhosi woMhlanga has by young women. There is a black bull sacrifice in the king's kraal as the young men work together to kill the animal without weapons, which was the subject of a failed lawsuit by South African animal rights activists in 2009.Activists cite animal cruelity as witnesses’ claims that the killing took 40 minutes, during which dozens of men trampled the bellowing, groaning bull, and wrenched its head around by the horns to tried to break its neck.

== Cultural Influence ==
The sacrifice of the bull is seen as transferring the bull's power to the king. The iNkatha was also renewed. The Scottish mythographer James George Frazer speculated that this reflected an ancient practice of sacrificing the king himself.

The Kingdom of Swaziland's counterpart event is Incwala, part of a larger family of Nguni First Fruit traditions. Aspects of the festival have been adapted by the Zulu-initiated Nazareth Baptist Church in its celebration of Christmas. The Zulu festival was a partial inspiration for the modern African-American holiday of Kwanzaa.
