= Dingane =

King of the Zulu Kingdom

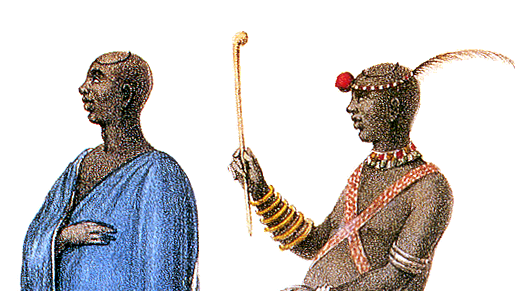
- Dingane in ordinary and dancing dress

King of the Zulu Kingdom
- Reign: 1828–1840
- Coronation: 1828
- Predecessor: Shaka
- Successor: Mpande
- Born: 1795
- Died: 1840 (aged 44–45); Hlatikhulu Forest, current KwaZulu-Natal
- Spouse: unknown
- Issue: unknown
Regnal name
- uVezi
- House: Zulu royal family
- Father: Senzangakhona kaJama
- Mother: Mpikase kaMlilela Ngobese

Dingane KaSenzangakhona Zulu (c. 1795–29 January 1840), commonly referred to as Dingane, Dingarn or Dingaan, was a Zulu prince who became king of the Zulu Kingdom in 1828, after assassinating his half-brother Shaka Zulu. He set up his royal capital, uMgungundlovu, translated to "Place of the Elephant" or "elephant swallower". He also constructed one of numerous military encampments, or kraals, in the eMakhosini Valley just south of the White Umfolozi River, on the slope of Lion Hill (Singonyama).

== Rise to power ==
Dingane came to power in 1828 after assassinating his half-brother Shaka with the help of another brother, Umhlangana, as well as Mbopa, Shaka's bodyguard. Following the death of Nandi, Shaka's behavior became increasingly erratic and many of his relatives accused Shaka of killing his mother. The true mastermind behind the murder of Shaka was his paternal aunt Mkabayi kaJama, who saw Dingane as the best of the choices for next King of the Zulu Nation. The assassination took place at KwaDukuza. Following Shaka's death, Dingane and Mkabayi conspired to kill Mbopa and Umhlangana, paving the way for Dingane to become sole ruler of the Zulu Empire.

== Governance and reverence ==
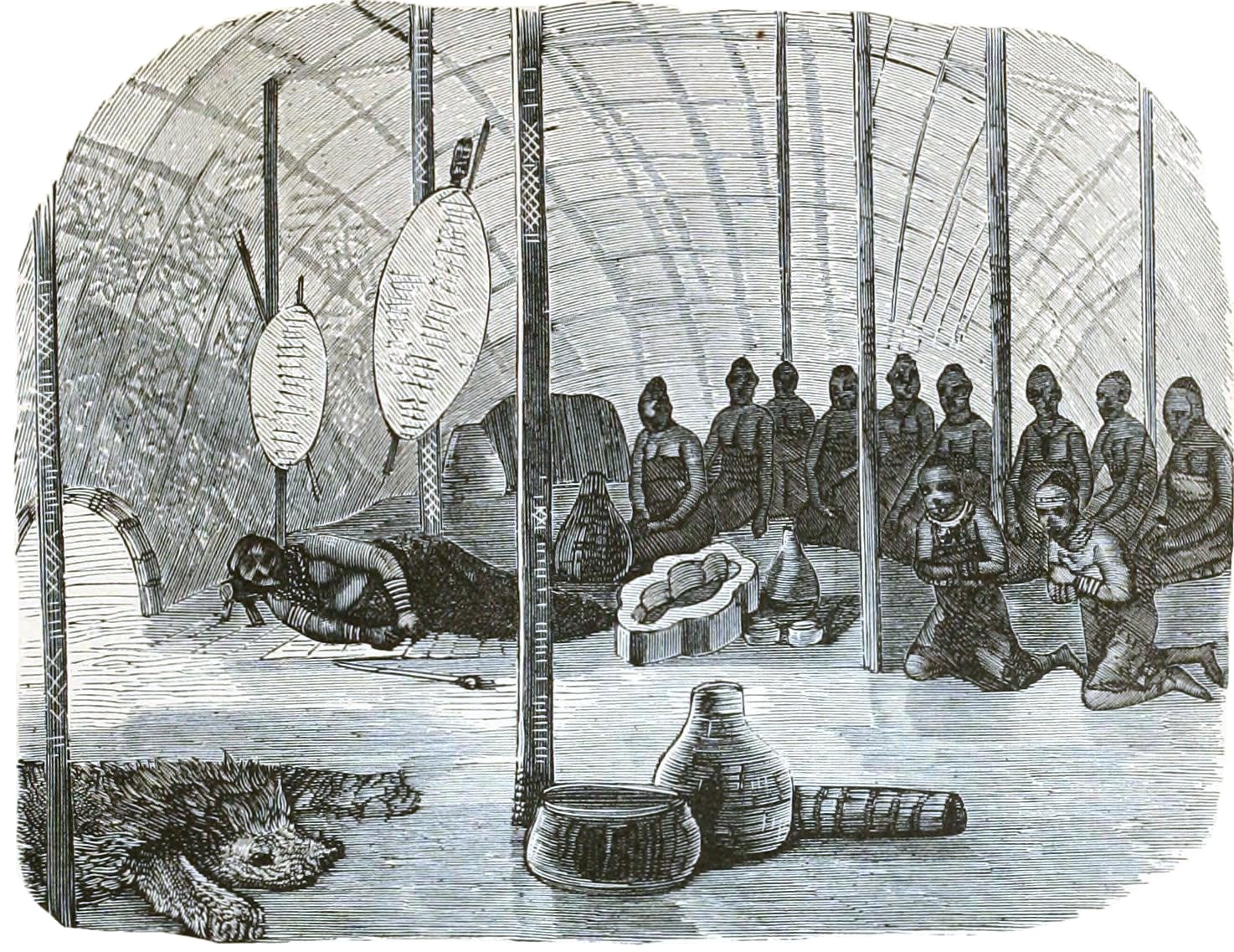
Dingane reclining in his hut with his wives shuffling about on their knees in his presence, as depicted by Captain Allen Gardiner. Gardiner visited Dingane in 1835 and 1837 and was instrumental in establishing Reverend Francis Owen's missionary station at the royal capital.

Captain Allen Gardiner related that Dingane was revered as the "great idol" of the Zulu nation, while a missionary, Rev. Francis Owen, who observed his rule at close quarters while stationed at Umgungundlovu, highlighted several aspects of his despotic governance.

Dingane's subjects applied god-like attributes to him, not admitting for instance that his reign might have had a beginning. He was deemed immortal, one who was neither born, nor would ever die. When asked when his reign started, his subjects replied "hundreds and hundreds of years ago." At their morning and evening meals, after receiving the distributed meat, they rose and exclaimed with raised hands: "Thou that art greater than the heavens."

The habit of Dingane's ministers, concubines and servants was not to think, act or speak, except at Dingane's suggestion or command. Owen observed that even Dingane's prime minister, Ndlela kaSompisi, refused to pay him a visit, when such a visit was not expressly ordered by the king. Nor would anyone grind Owen even a small amount of corn or sit down with him for prayer unless ordered to do so.

Dingane kept his 500 or so concubines in severe bondage. He referred to them as his sisters or children, and placed them in various ranks. They could leave the royal enclosure only with his permission, and when doing so were not allowed to cast an eye on any man or boy. Owen observed them a few times outside the palace, once when brought out to sing, and also when they were instructed to bring him thatch for his hut. Some would run away when the opportunity availed, only to be apprehended and executed.

Though Dingane allowed Owen to reside just outside his capital, he considered the Christian faith a fiction of the English, which was of no use to him or his subjects. On a particular Sunday, he did allow Owen to expound the main precepts of Christianity before an assembly of almost 1,000 Zulu men. These were assembled at the center of the Umgungundhlovu enclosure, supplied with beer and seated in a semi-circle, a few rows deep. Dingane reacted with some irritation to the message, proclaiming that it was old news to them, and incompatible with their views: "I and my people believe there is only one God – I am that God. ... I am the Great Chief – the God of the living; Umatiwane [whom I killed] is the Great Chief of the wicked."

== Royal enclosure (isigodlo) at UmGungundlovu ==
Location of Dingane’s kraal, umGungundlovu, within South Africa

Dingane built his capital city of umGungundlovu in 1829 and enlarged it five years later. UmGungundlovu was built according to the characteristic layout of a Zulu military settlement (singular: ikhanda, plural: amakhanda). The ikhanda consisted of a large, central circular parade ground (isibaya esikhulu), surrounded by warriors' barracks (uhlangoti) and storage huts for their shields. The isibaya was entered from the north.

The royal enclosure (isigodlo) was on the southern side of the complex, directly opposite the main entrance. The king, his mistresses and female attendants (Dingane never married officially), a total of at least 500 people, resided here. The women were divided into two groups: the black isigodlo and the white isigodlo. The black isigodlo comprised about 100 privileged women, and within that group was another elite, the bheje, a smaller number of girls favoured by the king as his mistresses. A small settlement was built for them behind the main complex, where they could enjoy some privacy. The remainder of the king's women were the white isigodlo. They were mainly girls presented to the king by his important subjects. He also selected other girls at the annual first fruit ceremony (umkhosi wokweshwama).

A huge half-moon shaped area was included in the black isigodlo; here the women and the king sang and danced. The huts in the black isigodlo were divided into compartments of about three huts each, enclosed by a two-metre-high hedge of intertwined withes, which created a network of passages.

The king's private hut (ilawu) was located in one such triangular compartment and had three or four entrances. His hut was very large and was kept very neat by attendants; it could easily accommodate 50 people. Modern archaeological excavations have revealed that the floor of this large hut was approximately 10 metres in diameter. Archaeologists found evidence inside the hut of 22 large supporting posts completely covered in glass beads. These had been noted in historical accounts by Piet Retief, leader of the Voortrekkers, and the British missionaries George Champion and Francis Owen.

On the south side, just behind the main complex, were three separate enclosed groups of huts. The centre group was used by the uBheje women of the black isigodlo. In this area, they initiated chosen young girls into the service of the king.

== Rebellion ==
Dingane lacked Shaka's military and leadership skills; rebel chiefs broke away from his rule. Chiefs who fell out of favour with Dingane fled the country, including Signabani.

The subjects of Signabani who were unable to flee with him were rounded up in their refuges and massacred. The dissension was exacerbated by armed conflict with the newly arrived Voortrekkers.

== Conflict with Voortrekkers ==
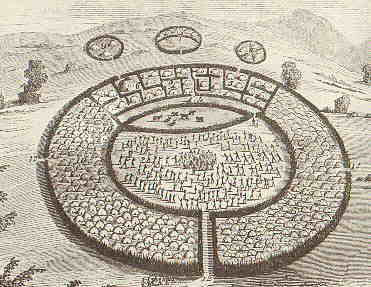
Dingane orders the capture of Piet Retief's party of Voortrekkers while they are spectators to a dancing routine of his soldiers.

In November 1837 Dingane met with Piet Retief, leader of the Voortrekkers. In return for their recovering some stolen cattle, Dingane signed a deed of cession of lands (written in English) to the Voortrekkers. It is generally believed that Dingane knew what he was signing although he could not have had any formal education, have read the contents of the document or have understood the concept of permanent land ownership since it was not a custom of the Zulus to assign land to individuals permanently. On 6 February 1838, after two days of feasting, the chief had Retief and his diplomatic party killed.

They had been told to leave their firearms outside the royal kraal. Suddenly, when the dancing had reached a frenzied climax, Dingane leapt to his feet and shouted Bulalani abathakathi!

The men were overpowered and dragged away to the hill kwaMatiwane, named after a chief, Matiwane, who had been killed there. Retief and his men were killed. It is alleged by some that they were killed because they withheld some of the cattle recovered from Chief Sekonyela. The general opinion is that Dingane did not wish to yield the land ceded to them in the treaty and mistrusted the presence of the Voortrekkers.

At the same time, Dingane's forces killed Retief's undefended trek party, about 500 Boers and native servants, including women and children. The Boers called it the Weenen massacre. The nearby present-day town of Weenen (Dutch for "weeping") was named by early settlers in memory of the massacre.

Then the Voortrekkers organised an attack on the Zulus led by Andries Potgieter (the veteran who defeated Mzilikazi and forced him to flee) and Piet Uys one of the Great trek leaders they matched into the Zulu territory and saw a herd of cattle at the mountains of italeni as they approached to get the cattles only to find out it was actually the Zulu shilds with the Zulu warriors who gave a chase on the Voortrekkers Andries Potgieter saw the trap and chose to save his live and Piet Uys was trapped and killed by Zulus who won the battle of Italeni.

Dingane ordered his army to seek and kill the group of Voortrekkers under Andries Pretorius. The Zulu impis attacked the Voortrekker encampment, but they were defeated in the ensuing Battle of Blood River. An estimated 3,000 Zulus were killed. Dingane's commander at the battle was Ndlela kaSompisi.

== Overthrow and death ==
In January 1840, Pretorius and a force of 400 Boers helped Mpande in his revolt against his half-brother Dingane, which resulted in the latter's overthrow and death. Mpande succeeded Dingane. At the Battle of Maqongqo, many of Dingane's own men deserted to Mpande's army. Dingane had his general, Ndlela kaSompisi, executed, and with a few followers, he sought refuge in Nayawo territory on the Lubombo mountains. A group of Nyawo and Swazi assassinated him in Hlatikhulu Forest.

Dingane's grave is near Ingwavuma in the Hlatikulu Forest, an hour's drive from Tembe elephant park.

King of the Zulu Nation
Preceded by: Shaka	Reign; 1828–1840	Succeeded by: Mpande

== Literary accounts ==
Sir Henry Rider Haggard's novels Nada the Lily and Marie include versions of some events in Dingane's life, as does Bertram Mitford's 1898 novel The Induna's Wife.

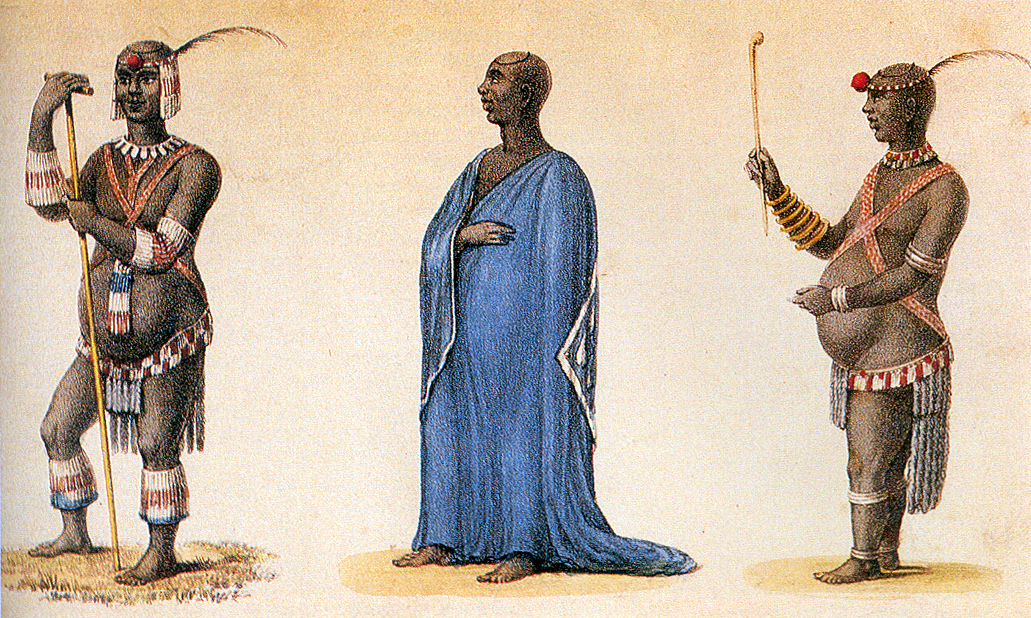
Dingane in ordinary and dancing dress, illustrated from life by Captain Gardiner

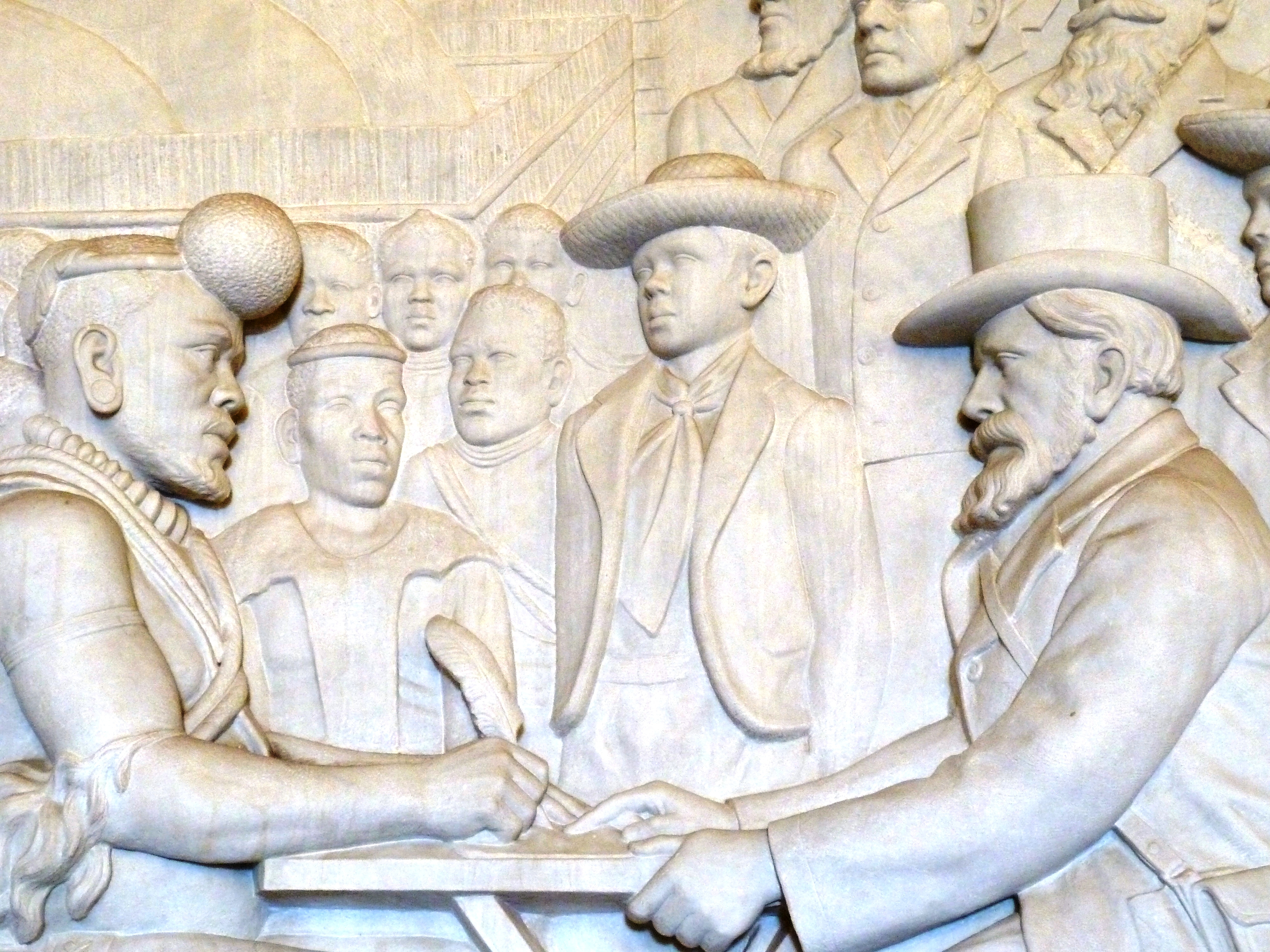
Dingane signing a treaty with Piet Retief, as depicted in the Voortrekker Monument

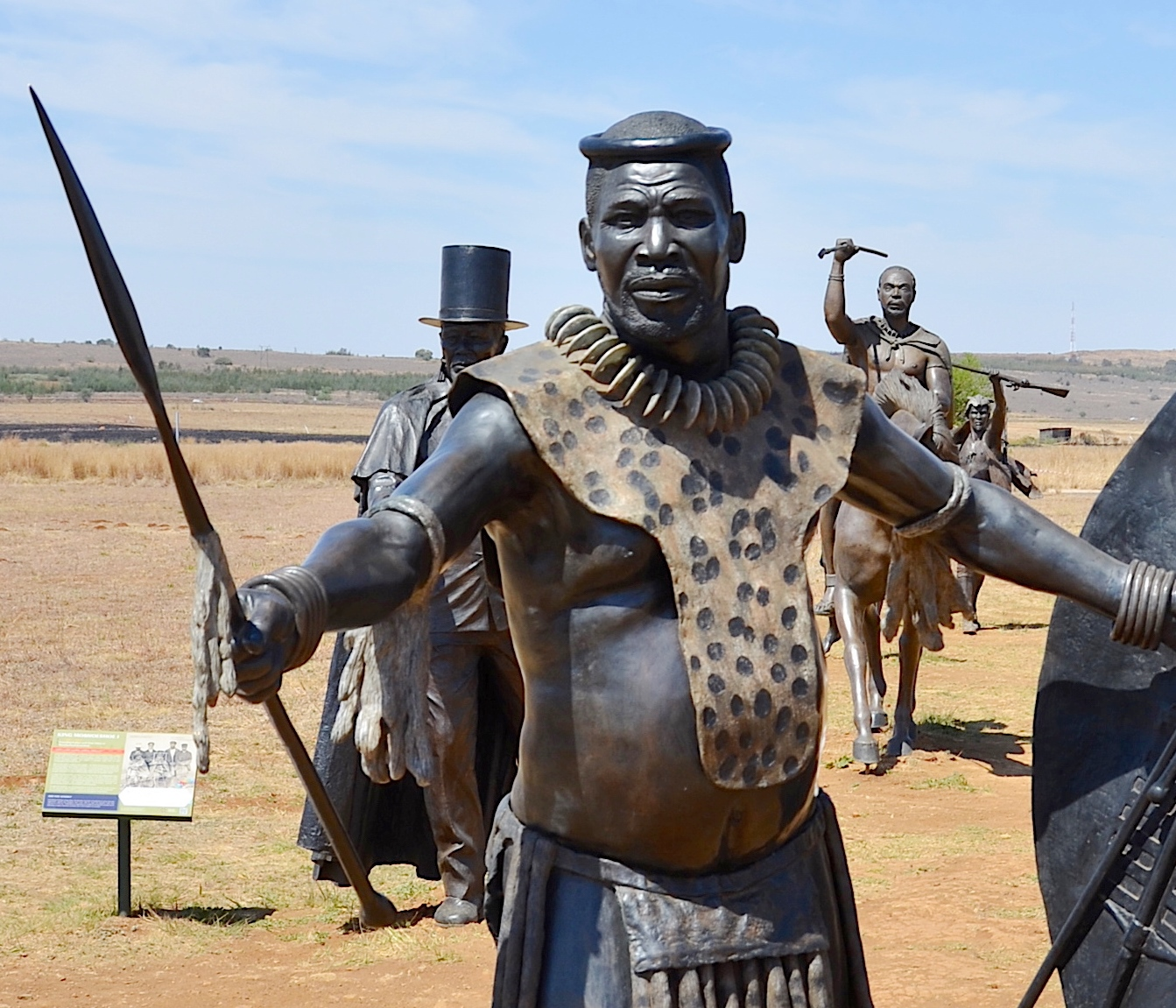
Bronze statue of Dingane at Maropeng, in the Long March to Freedom exhibition
