= Zulu people =

Nguni ethnic group

Zulu people AmaZulu
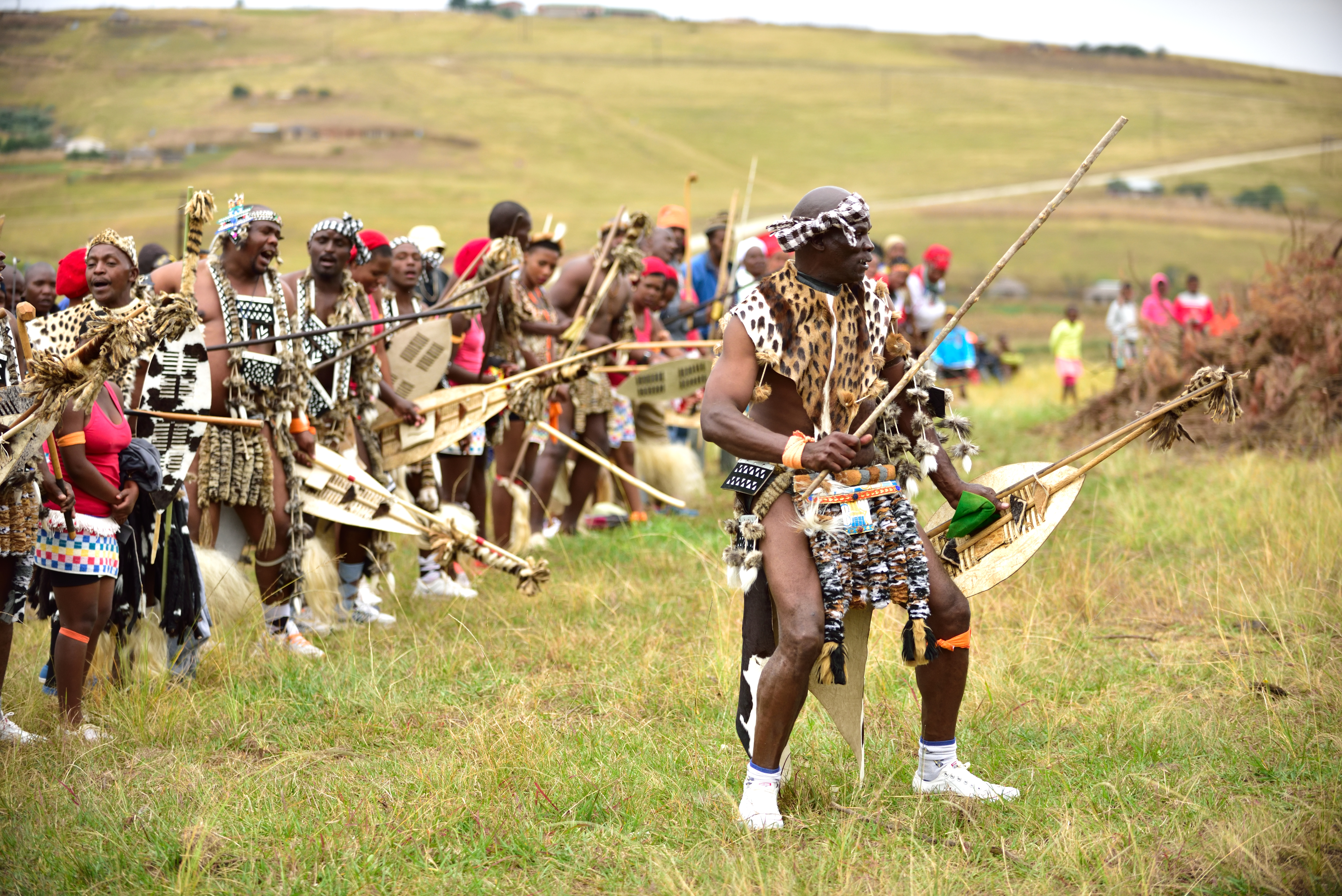

Total population
- 15,723,791

Regions with significant populations
- South Africa (KwaZulu-Natal)

Languages
- Zulu; Tsonga; Sotho; Xhosa; English

Religion
- Christianity, Zulu religion

Related ethnic groups
- Xhosa, Swazi, Hlubi, Thembu people, Southern Ndebele, Northern Ndebele and Ngoni, San people

Zulu
- Person: UmZulu
- People: AmaZulu
- Language: IsiZulu
- Country: KwaZulu

Zulu people (/ˈzuːluː/; Zulu: amaZulu) are a native people of Southern Africa of the Nguni. The Zulu people are the largest ethnic group and nation in South Africa, living mainly in the province of KwaZulu-Natal.

They originated from Nguni communities who took part in the Bantu migrations over millennia. As the clans integrated, the rulership of Shaka brought success to the Zulu nation due to his improved military tactics and organization.

Zulus take pride in their ceremonies such as the Umhlanga, or Reed Dance, and their various forms of beadwork.

The art and skill of beadwork take part in the identification of Zulu people and act as a form of communication and dedication to the nation and specific traditions. Today, the Zulu people are predominantly Christian, but have created a syncretic religion that is combined with the Zulu's prior belief systems.

== History of the Zulu people ==
=== Origins ===
The Zulu were originally a minor clan in what is today Northern KwaZulu-Natal, founded c. 1574 by Zulu kaMalandela. In the Nguni languages, iZulu means heaven or weather. At that time, the area was occupied by many large Nguni communities and clans (also called the isizwe people or nation, or called isibongo, referring to their clan or family name). Nguni communities had migrated down Africa's east coast over millennia, as part of the Bantu migrations. As the nation began to develop, the rulership of Shaka (about 250 years after it was founded) brought the clans together to build a cohesive identity for the Zulu.

=== Zulu military ===
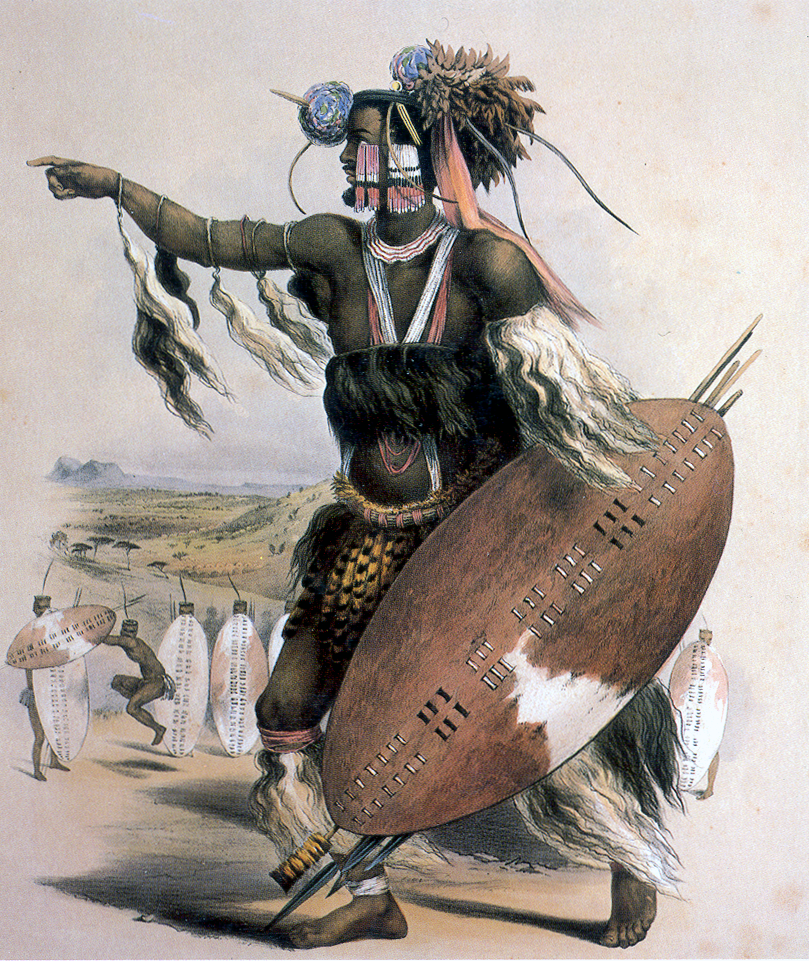
Utimuni, nephew of King Shaka, strikes a warrior's pose

The Zulu nation's growth and strength were based on its military organization and skills during Shaka's reign and those of his successors. The military was organized around the ukubuthwa ("to be enrolled") system, which did away with initiation ceremonies for the most part. Each age set, or group of young men of the same age, was assigned to the same regiment (ibutho, singular; amabutho, plural), according to the system. Girls were also subject to ukubuthwa, but they were usually assigned to an age group rather than to a regiment. The amabutho were housed in military barracks (singular, ikhanda; plural, amakhanda) located throughout the kingdom and under the command of a close relative to (or someone else appointed by) the king.

The barracks were designed and laid out similarly to an umuzi, but on a much larger scale. Aside from military duties, the izinsizwa ("young men") were also responsible for the repair and maintenance of their barracks.

=== Mvelase ===
The Mvelase people descend from the independent AbaThembu nation through King Mthembu for generations, they ruled themselves as a separate kingdom in the regions of Msinga and Qhudeni. During the early 19th-century expansion, King Shaka Zulu conquered the Mvelase people. His regiments launched military campaigns into their territories, forcing their prominent chief, Ngoza, to flee south. The Mvelase people who remained were absorbed into the Zulu empire, conscripted into Shaka's army, and integrated into Zulu culture. While they are proudly recognized as Zulu today, but historically not part of it their distinct royal lineage remains rooted in the AbaThembu nation.

=== Kingdom ===
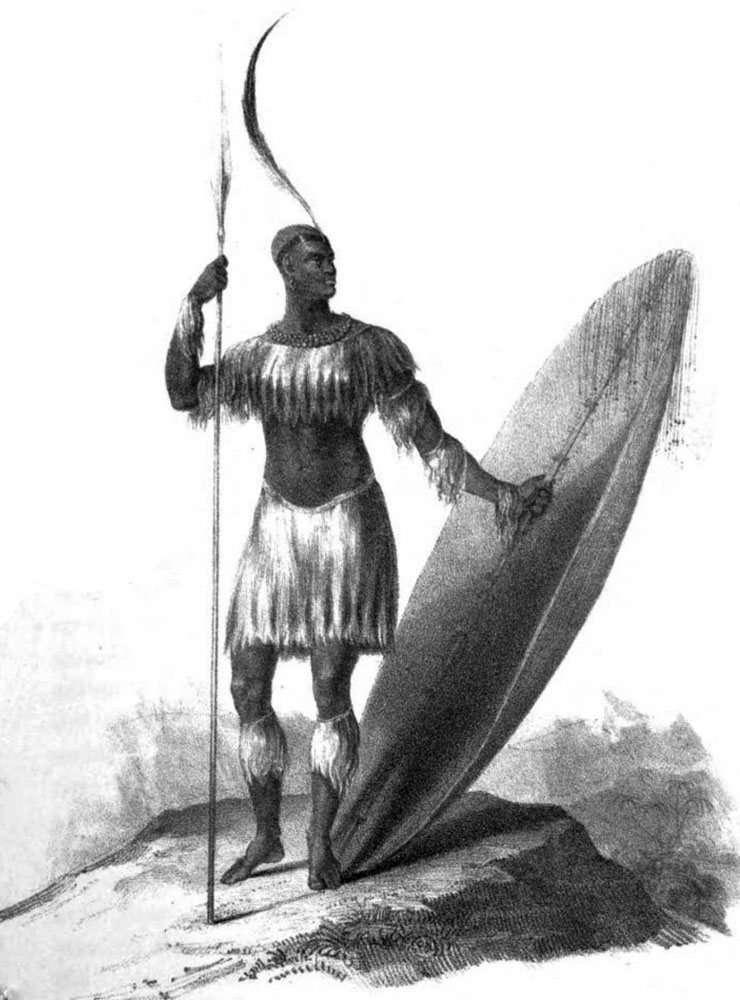
King Shaka

The Zulu formed a powerful state in 1816 under the leader Shaka. Shaka, as the Zulu commander of the Mthethwa Empire and successor to Dingiswayo, united what was once a confederation of lordships into an imposing empire under Zulu hegemony. Shaka built a militarized system known as Impi featuring conscription, a standing army, new weaponry, regimentation, and encirclement battle tactics. Zulu expansion was a major factor of the Mfecane ("Crushing") that depopulated large areas of southern Africa. It was during this period when Shaka deployed an army regiment for raiding nations in the North. The regiment which was under Mzilikazi disobeyed Shaka and crafted a plan to continue raiding up-North forming another dialect of Zulu language referred to as Northern Ndebele (now in Zimbabwe). Another group under Zwangendaba who was Shaka's relative from the Gumbi Clan from Pongola and military commander trekked northwards crossing the Zambezi River at Chirundu in 1835 into Zambia setting up the Ngoni nation that extended to Malawi, Mozambique and Southern Tanzania.

==== Conflict with the British ====
In mid-December 1878, envoys of the British crown delivered an ultimatum to 11 chiefs representing the then-current king of the Zulu empire, Cetshwayo. Under the British terms delivered to the Zulu, Cetshwayo would have been required to disband his army and accept British sovereignty. Cetshwayo refused, and war between the Zulus and African contingents of the British crown began on January 12, 1879. Despite an early victory for the Zulus at the Battle of Isandlwana on 22 January, the British fought back and won the Battle at Rorke's Drift, and decisively defeated the Zulu army by July at the Battle of Ulundi.

==== Absorption into Natal ====
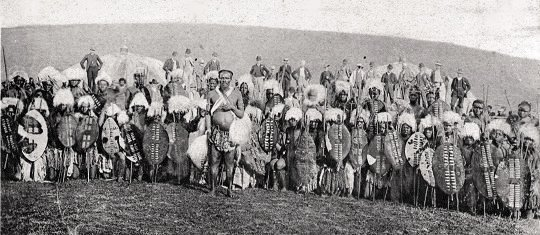
Zulu warriors in the late nineteenth century, with Europeans in the background

After Cetshwayo's capture a month following his defeat, the British divided the Zulu Empire into 13 "kinglets". The sub-kingdoms fought amongst each other until 1883 when Cetshwayo was reinstated as king over Zululand. This still did not stop the fighting and the Zulu monarch was forced to flee his realm by Zibhebhu, one of the 13 kinglets, supported by Boer mercenaries. Cetshwayo died of a heart attack in February 1884, leaving his son, the 15-year-old Dinuzulu, to inherit the throne. In-fighting between the Zulu continued for years until in 1897 Zululand was absorbed fully into the British colony of Natal.

=== Apartheid years ===
==== KwaZulu homeland ====
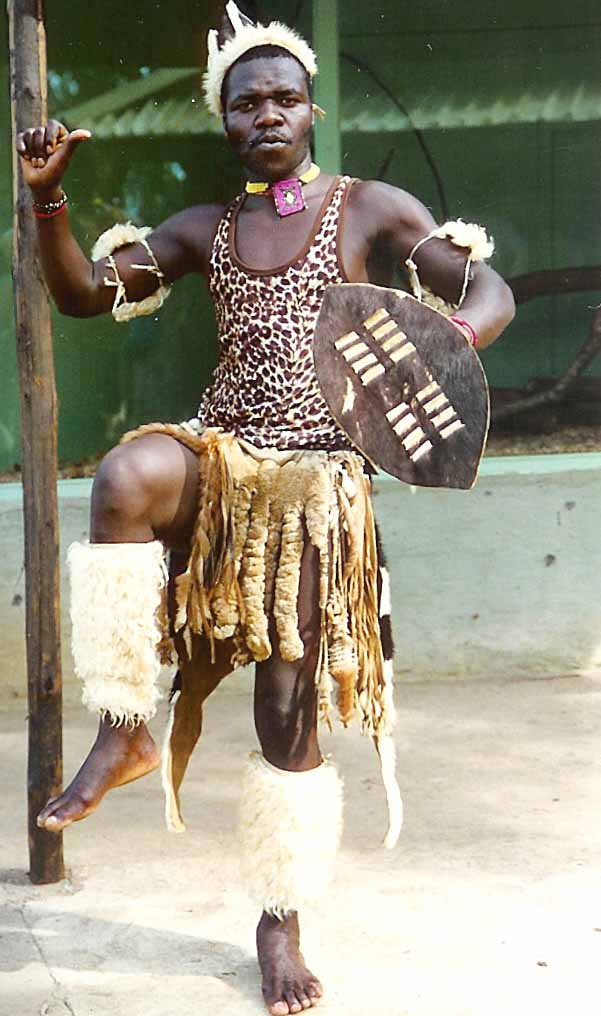
Zulu man performing traditional warrior dance

Under apartheid, the homeland of KwaZulu (Kwa meaning place of) was created for the Zulu people. In 1970, the Bantu Homeland Citizenship Act provided that all Zulus would become citizens of KwaZulu, losing their South African citizenship. KwaZulu consisted of many disconnected pieces of land, in what is now KwaZulu-Natal. Hundreds of thousands of Zulu people living on privately owned "black spots" outside of KwaZulu were dispossessed and forcibly moved to bantustans – worse land previously reserved for whites contiguous to existing areas of KwaZulu. By 1993, approximately 5.2 million Zulu people lived in KwaZulu, and approximately 2 million lived in the rest of South Africa. The Chief Minister of KwaZulu, from its creation in 1970 (as Zululand) was Chief Mangosuthu Buthelezi. In 1994, KwaZulu was joined with the province of Natal, to form the modern KwaZulu-Natal.

==== Inkatha YeSizwe ====
Inkatha YeSizwe means "the crown of the nation". In 1975, Buthelezi revived the Inkatha YaKwaZulu, the predecessor of the Inkatha Freedom Party. This organisation was nominally a protest movement against Apartheid but held more conservative views than the ANC. For example, Inkatha was opposed to the armed struggle, and sanctions against South Africa. Inkatha was initially on good terms with the ANC, but the two organisations came into increasing conflict beginning in 1976 in the aftermath of the Soweto Uprising.

== Language ==
Map of South Africa showing the primary Zulu language speech area in shades of darker green

The language of the Zulu people is "isiZulu", a Bantu language; more specifically, part of the Nguni subgroup. Zulu is the most widely spoken language in South Africa, where it is an official language. More than half of the South African population can understand it, with over 13.78 million first-language and over 15 million second-language speakers. Many Zulu people also speak Xitsonga, Sesotho and others from among South Africa's 12 official languages.

== Ceremony ==
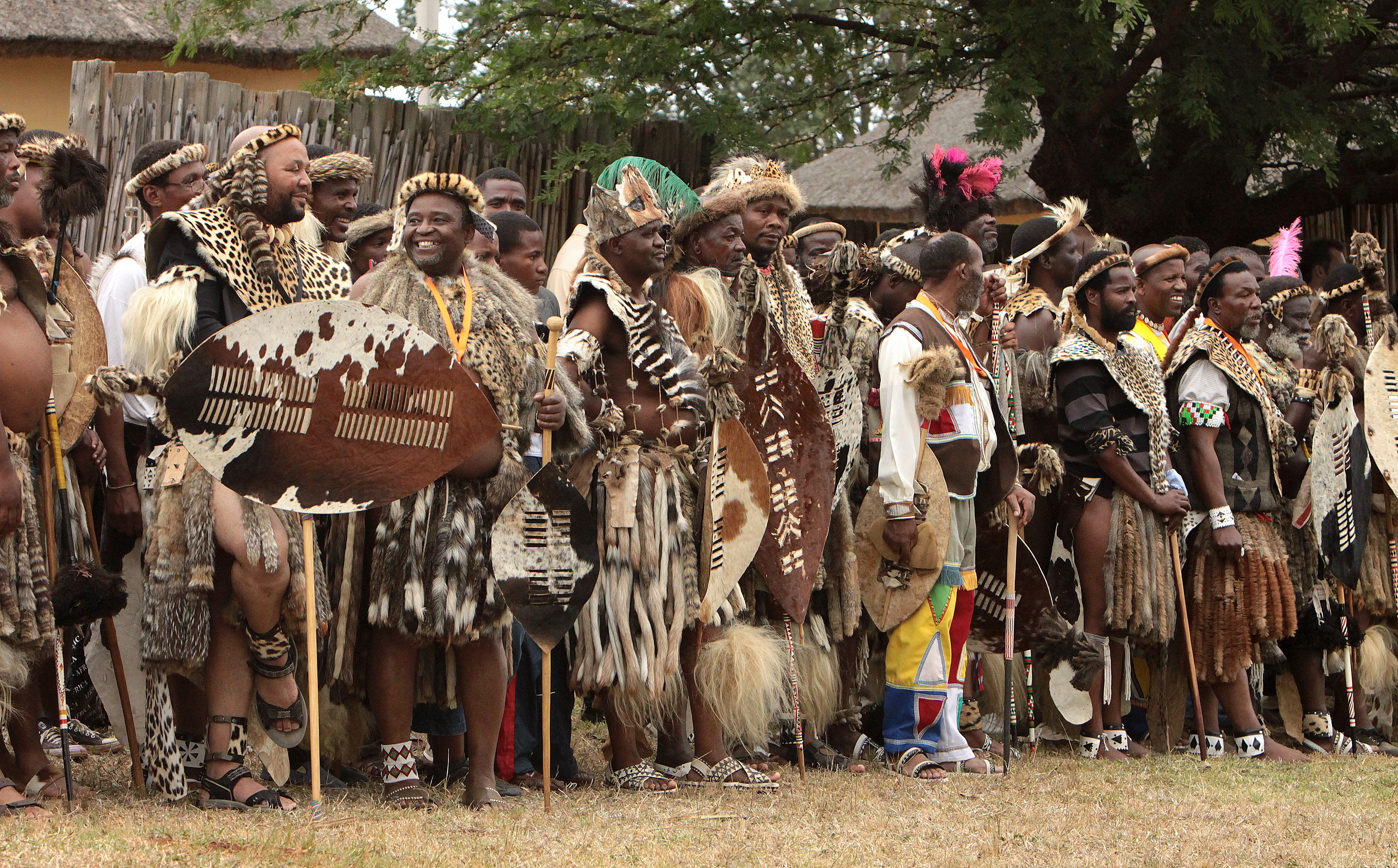
Zulu people gather at Reed Dance ceremony.

=== Umhlanga ===
The Zulu people celebrate an annual event that was established in 1984 called the Umhlanga or Reed Dance. This event takes place at the royal capital near Nongoma. This traditional ceremony is performed by young women from all parts of the kingdom to perform in front of the monarch and his guests. The purpose of this event is to promote pride in virginity and to restrain sexual relationships. Beadwork is a prominent attire that is worn at the Umhlanga. The beadwork is not only worn by the dancers but by the guests as well. The Umhlanga is not purely for a time of dance. The King also uses this time to speak to the young men and women of the nation. The King discusses current political issues.

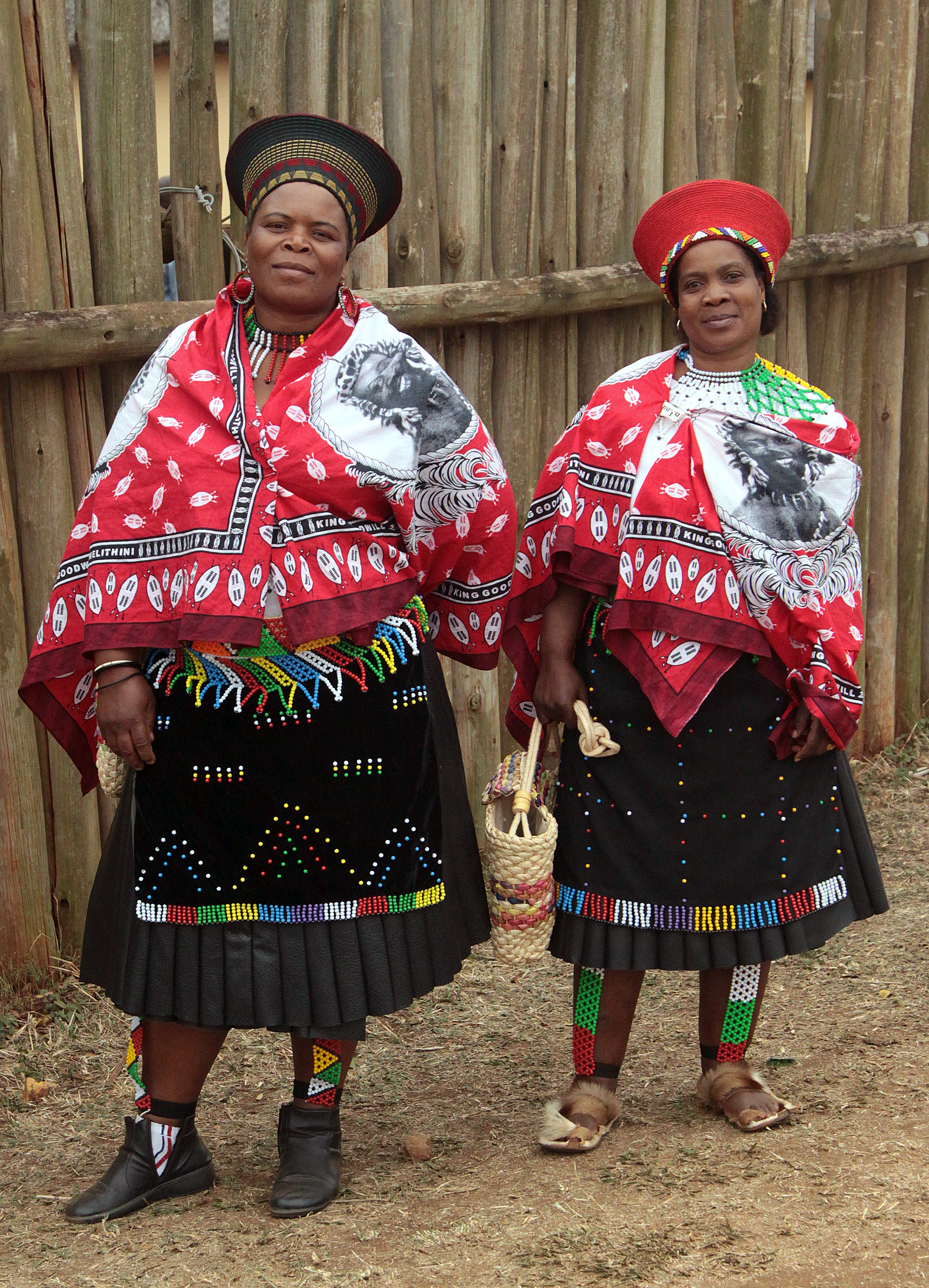
Married Zulu women wearing headdresses at annual Reed Dance ceremony.

== Beadwork ==
=== History of beadwork ===
The creation of beadwork dates back to the times of war for the Zulu people. This particular form of beadwork was known as iziqu, medallions of war. Often worn as a necklace, the beads were displayed in a criss-cross formation across the shoulders. This assemblage of beads by the warriors represented a symbol of bravery. Before the use of glass was apparent to the Zulu, beadwork was derived from wood, seeds and berries. It was not until the arrival of Europeans that glass became a trade material with the Portuguese, which soon became abundantly available to the Zulu.

=== Purpose of beadwork ===
Beadwork is a form of communication for the Zulu people. Typically when one is wearing multiple beads, it is a sign of wealth. The more beads one is wearing, the wealthier they are perceived. The beads have the potential to convey information about a person's age, gender and marital status. The design of the beads often conveys a particular message. However, one must know the context of their use to read the message correctly. Depending on the area in which the beadwork was made, some designs can depict different messages compared to other areas. A message could be embedded into the colours and structure of the beads or could be strictly for decorative purposes. Beadwork can be worn in everyday use but is often worn during important occasions such as weddings, or ceremonies. For example, beadwork is featured during the coming of age for a young girl or worn during dances. The beaded elements complement the costumes worn by the Zulu people to bring out a sense of finery or prestige.

=== Apparel ===
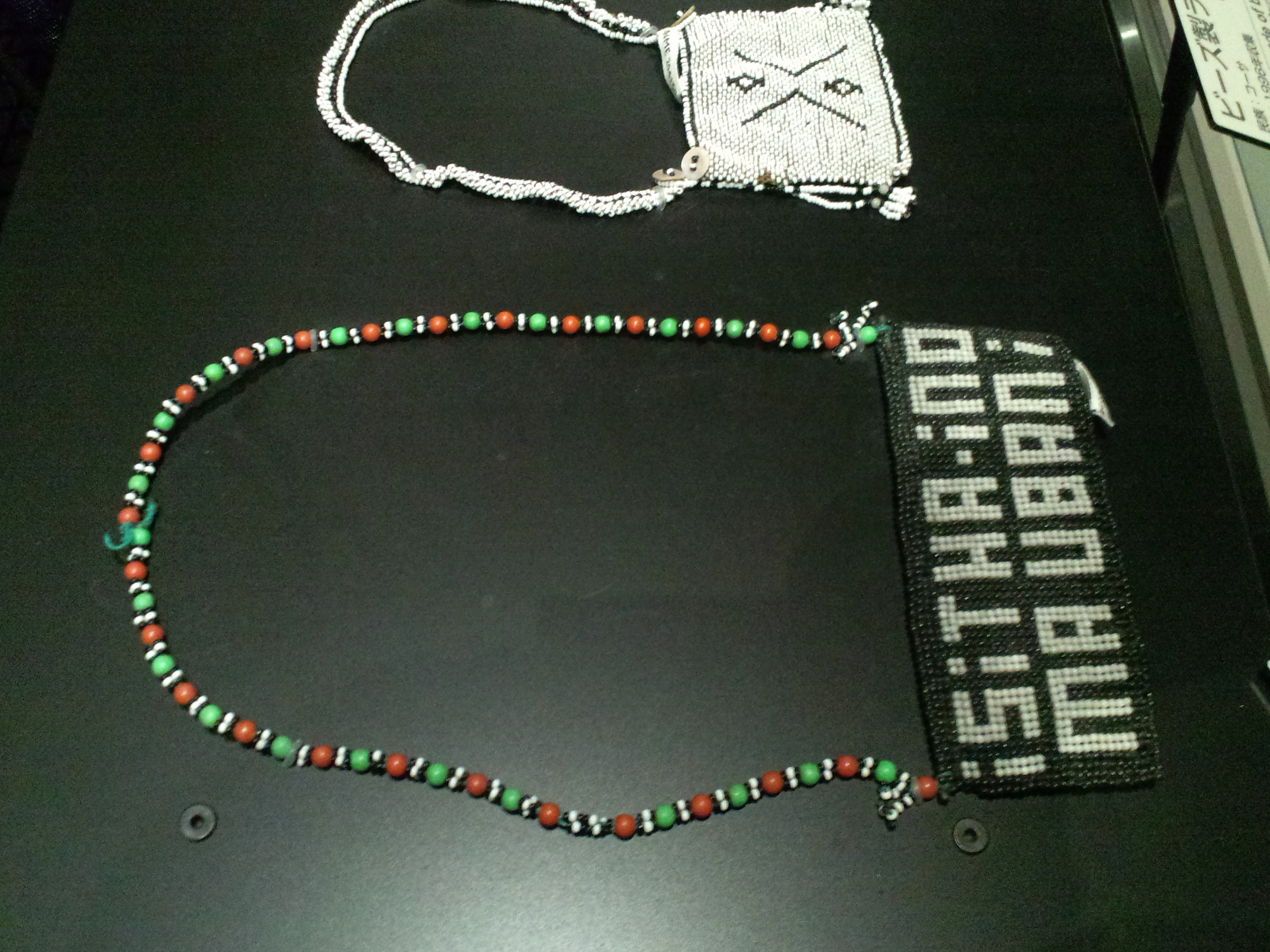
Zulu beadwork necklace

Beadwork is worn by all men, women, and children at any age. Depending on which stage of life an individual is in, the beadwork indicates different meanings. Beadwork is predominantly worn when young Zulu people are courting or in search of love affairs. The wearing of decorative beadwork can act as an attempt to grab the attention of someone of the opposite sex. Also, the gifting of beadwork is a way of communicating interest with lovers. During the transition from single to married women, beadwork is shown through a beaded cloth apron worn over a pleated leather skirt. As for older or mature women, beadwork is displayed in detailed headdresses and cowhide skirts that extend past the knee. These long skirts are also seen on unmarried women and young marriageable-age girls. Men are more conservative when wearing beadwork. However, when a young boy is seen wearing multiple necklaces, it is a sign that he is highly interested in these gifts from various girls. The more gifts he wears, the higher the prestige he obtains.

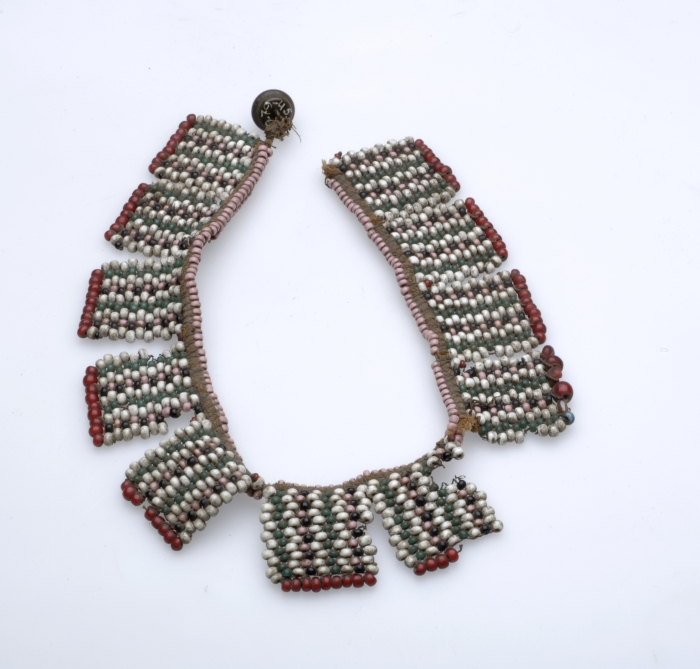
Zulu beadwork necklace.

=== Colours of beads ===
Various forms of beadwork are found in different colour schemes. Typically, there are four different types of colour schemes:

- Isisshunka – white, light blue, dark green, pale yellow, pink, red, black. This colour scheme is believed to have no specific meaning.
- Isithembu – light blue, grass green, bright yellow, red, black. This colour scheme derives from clans or clan areas.
- Umzansi – white, dark blue, grass green, red. This colour scheme also derives from clans or clan areas.
- Isinyolovane – a combination of any colours not consistent with other colour schemes. This colour scheme is often related to connotations of perfection and charm.

The colours of beads might hold different meanings based on the area that they originated from. It is often that this can lead to misrepresentation or confusion when attempting to understand what the beadwork is communicating. One cannot assume that the colour system is standard across South Africa. In some areas, the colour green symbolises jealousy in a certain area, but in other areas it symbolises grass. One must know the origin of the beadwork to interpret the message correctly.

== Clothing ==
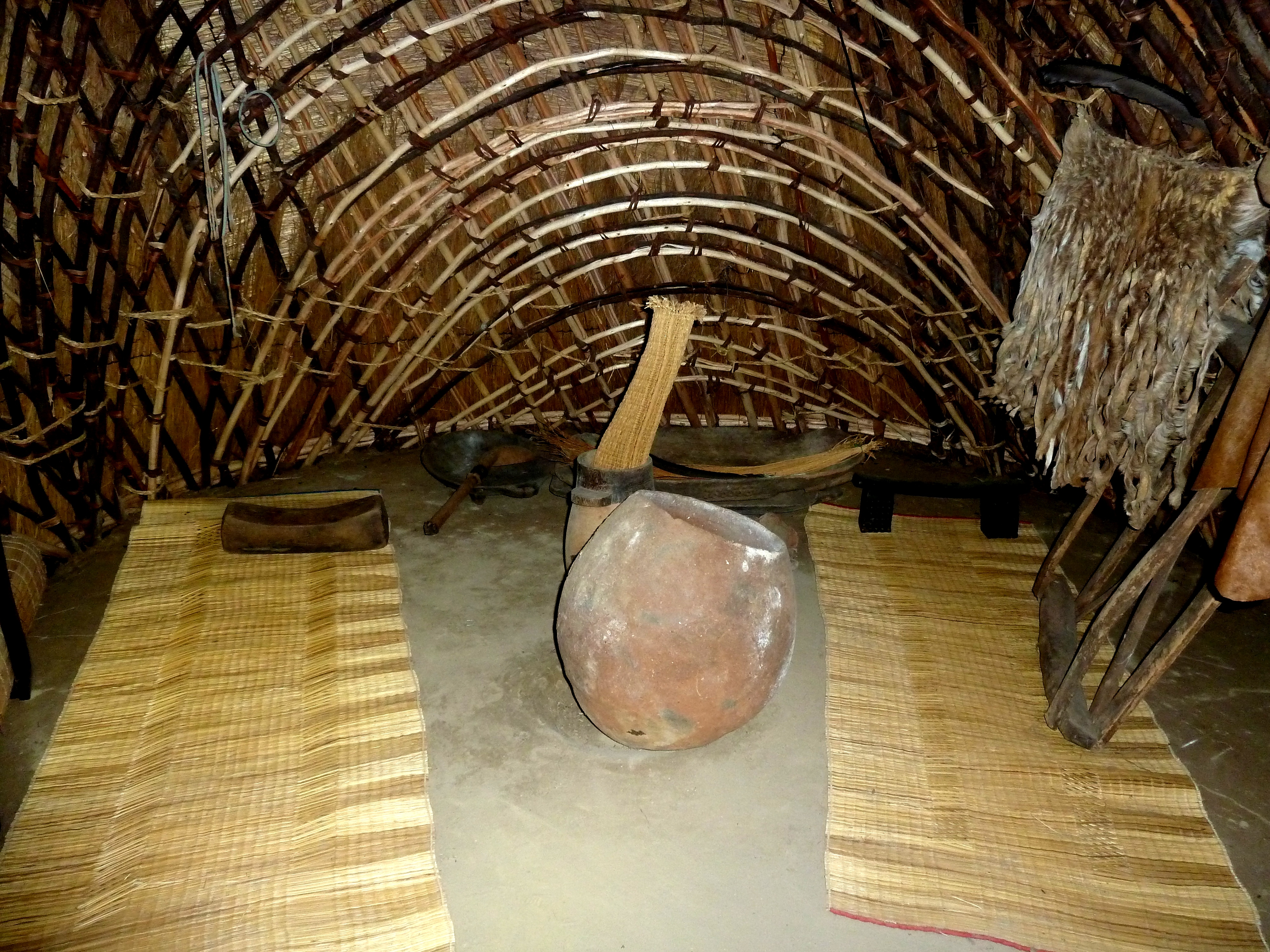
Interior space of a traditional beehive hut or iQhugwane

Zulus wear a variety of attire, both traditional for ceremonial or culturally celebratory occasions, and modern Westernised clothing for everyday use. The women dress differently depending on whether they are single, engaged, or married. The men wore a leather belt with two strips of hide hanging down front and back.

In South Africa, the miniskirt has existed since pre-colonial times. In some African cultures, such as the Basotho, the Batswana, the Bapedi, the Amaswati and the AmaZulu, women wore traditional miniskirts as cultural attire. These skirts are not seen as shameless, but are used to cover the women's genitals. The skirts are called isigcebhezana and are essential in Zulu ceremonies. For example, Umemulo is a ceremony for women who turn 21 years of age. It represents a huge transition in the woman's life because it is a symbol of her being ready to accept a boyfriend and even get married. Additionally, each stage of a Zulu's life is determined by a specific type of clothing. An unmarried woman wears a skirt and nothing on top, but as she grows up, the woman starts to cover up her body because a time will come when she will be a married woman and an old woman. Nonetheless, a special type of clothing is reserved for pregnant women. When a woman is pregnant she wears an "isibamba", a thick belt made from dried grass, covered with glass or plastic beadwork, to support her swelling stomach and its additional weight.

== Societal roles ==
=== Men ===
The Zulu people govern under a patriarchal society. Men are perceived as the head of the household and seen as authoritative figures. Zulu men identify themselves with great pride and dignity. They also compare themselves to qualities of powerful wild animals such as bulls, lions and elephants. The men contribute to society by acting as defenders, hunters, and lovers. The Zulu men are also in charge of herding the cattle, educating themselves on the lives of disciplined warriors, creating weapons, and learning the art of stick fighting.

In Zulu herding culture, adolescent boys have been known to practice hlobanga, or intercrural sex, to explore their sexuality.

==== Stick fighting ====
The art of stick fighting is a celebration of manhood for Zulu men. These men can begin to learn this art of fighting from as young as the age of five years old. There are multiple reasons why men learn how to stick fight. For example, men may want to learn so that they can set right any wrongs or insults made towards them. Other reasons some men choose to learn are for sporting purposes, proving skills or manliness, and self-defense. The goal of stick fighting is to injure the opponent and sometimes even kill. There are rules of etiquette that must be abided by when stick fighting. The men can only fight a man the same age as them. One cannot hit the opponent when they lose their stick. Only sticks are allowed when fighting.

=== Women ===
The women in Zulu society often perform domestic chores such as cleaning, raising children, collecting water and firewood, laundry, tending to crops, cooking, and making clothes. Women can be considered as the sole income earners of the household. A woman's stages of life lead up to the goal of marriage. As a woman approaches puberty, she is known as a tshitshi. A tshitshi reveals her singleness by wearing less clothing. Single women typically do not wear clothing to cover their head, breasts, legs and shoulders. Engaged women wear hairnets to show their marital status to society and married women cover themselves in clothing and headdresses. Also, women are taught to defer to men and treat them with great respect. The women are always bound by a male figure.

== Religion and beliefs ==
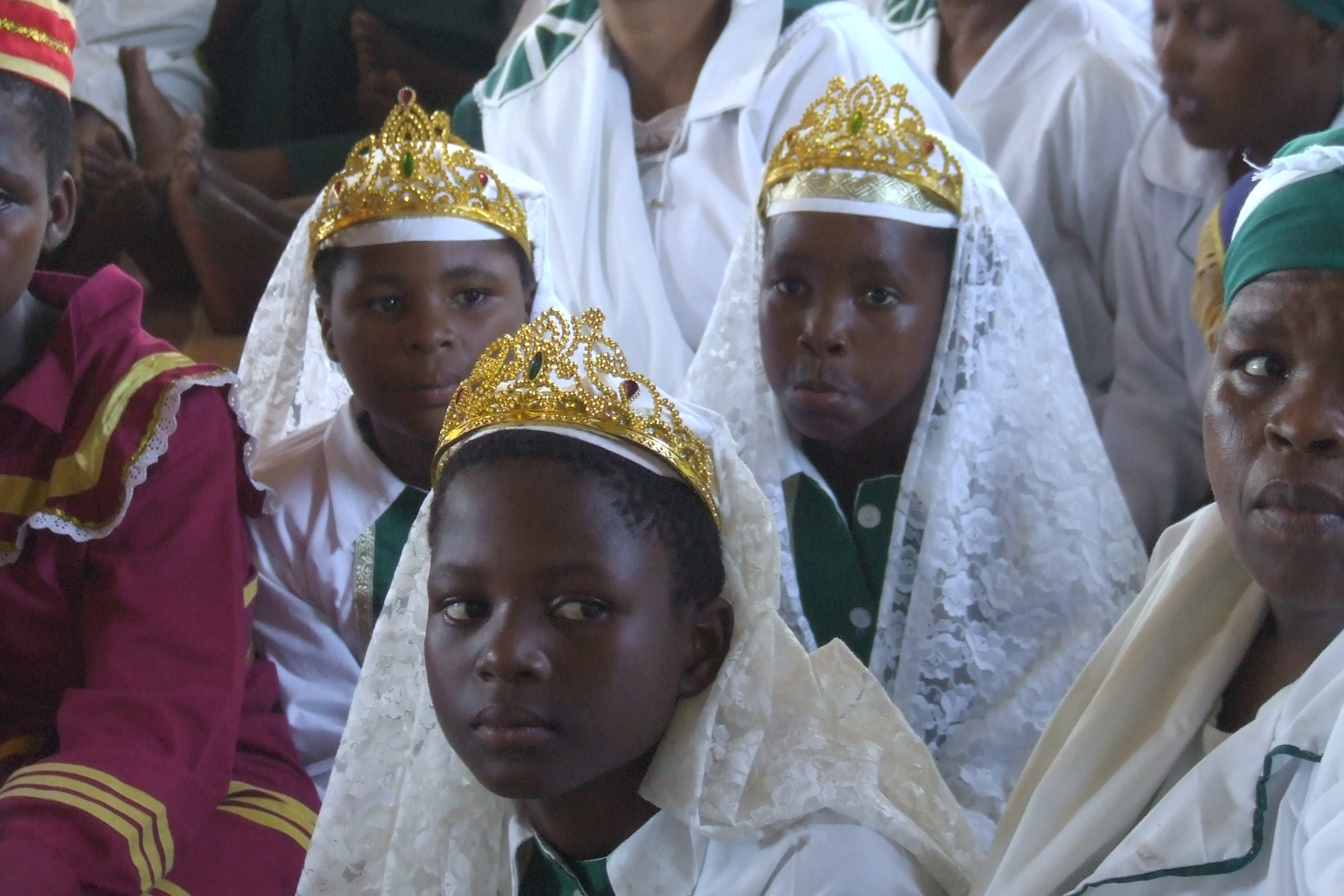
Zulu worshippers at a United African Apostolic Church, near Oribi Gorge

Most Zulu people state their beliefs to be Christian. Some of the most common churches to which they belong are African Initiated Churches, especially the Zion Christian Church, Nazareth Baptist Church and United African Apostolic Church, although membership of major European Churches, such as the Dutch Reformed, Anglican and Catholic Churches are also common. Nevertheless, many Zulus retain their traditional pre-Christian belief system of ancestor worship in parallel with their Christianity.

Traditional Zulu religion includes belief in a creator God (uNkulunkulu) who is above interacting in day-to-day human life, although this belief appears to have originated from efforts by early Christian missionaries to frame the idea of the Christian God in Zulu terms. Traditionally, the more strongly held Zulu belief was in ancestor spirits (amaThongo or amaDlozi), who had the power to intervene in people's lives, for good or ill. This belief continues to be widespread among the modern Zulu population.

Traditionally, the Zulu recognize several elements to be present in a human being: the physical body (inyama yomzimba or umzimba); the breath or life force (umoya womphefumulo or umoya); and the "shadow" prestige or personality (isithunzi). Once the umoya leaves the body, the isithunzi may live on as an ancestral spirit (idlozi) only if certain conditions were met in life. Behaving with ubuntu, or showing respect and generosity towards others, enhances one's moral standing or prestige in the community, one's isithunzi. By contrast, acting in a negative way towards others can reduce the isithunzi, and the isithunzi can fade away completely.

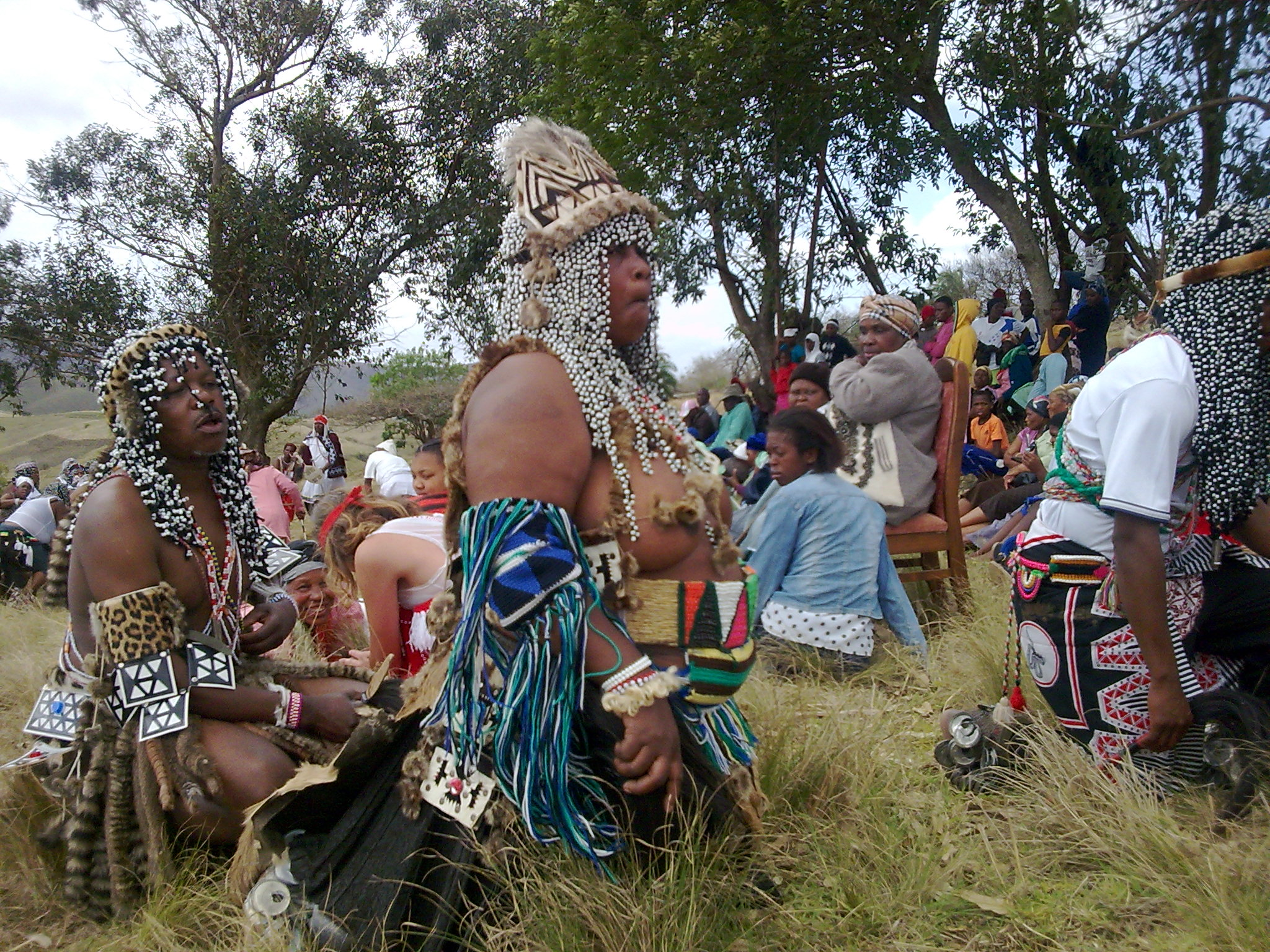
Zulu sangomas (diviners)

To appeal to the spirit world, a diviner (sangoma) must invoke the ancestors through divination processes to determine the problem. Then, a herbalist (inyanga) prepares a mixture (muthi) to be consumed to influence the ancestors. As such, diviners and herbalists play an important part in the daily lives of the Zulu people. However, a distinction is made between white muthi (umuthi omhlope), which has positive effects, such as healing or the prevention or reversal of misfortune, and black muthi (umuthi omnyama), which can bring illness or death to others, or ill-gotten wealth to the user. Users of black muthi are considered witches, and shunned by society.

Christianity had difficulty gaining a foothold among the Zulu people, and when it did it was in a syncretic fashion. Isaiah Shembe, considered the Zulu Messiah, presented a form of Christianity (the Nazareth Baptist Church) which incorporated traditional customs.

Furthermore, the Zulu people also practice a ceremony called Ukweshwama. The killing of the bull is part of Ukweshwama, an annual ceremony that celebrates a new harvest. It is a day of prayer when Zulus thank their creator and their ancestors. By tradition, a new regiment of young warriors is asked to confront a bull to prove its courage, inheriting the beast's strength as it expires. It is believed this power was then transferred to the Zulu king.

== Bride wealth ==
Zulu people have a system called ilobolo, dowry in English. This term is particularly used by Zulu people when it comes to bride wealth. Every African ethnic group has different requirements when it comes to bride wealth. In pre-capitalist Zulu society, ilobolo was inextricably linked to the ownership of cattle. During that time, there was not a fixed number of cattle required for the wedding to happen; it could be paid before the marriage or during the marriage. The groom takes the cattle from his father's herd to perpetuate the family heritage. Nonetheless, this ritual changed during colonisation because in 1869, Theophilus Shepstone, then Natal Secretary for Native Affairs, formalized the ilobolo payment to 10 cattle for commoners (plus the ingquthu cow for the mother), 15 for hereditary chief siblings and 20-plus for the daughters of a chief. They found it too lenient to let the groom give whatever amount he wanted, so they decided to establish a specific number of cattle that would be needed before or at the start of the marriage. This has been accepted by Zulu men who were educated in mission schools, but according to more ritual people this became "untraditional". Additionally, with the instauration of the Natal Code, some Zulu men decided to settle another way in which they could decrease the ilobo: offer a token payment or bring a present for the father of the prospective bride to decrease the ilobolo amount to be paid. The payment of ilobolo can be difficult for some families, but as it is often considered a symbol of pride and respect, many are willing to maintain this tradition as long as possible.

== See also ==
- King of the Zulu Nation
- Battle of Blood River
- Gumboot dance
- Inkatha Freedom Party
- List of Zulu kings
- Nguni
- Shaka Zulu
- Ukusoma
- Zulu language

== Novels ==
- Walton Golightly, The People of the Sky, Quercus, 2013
- (in French) Philippe Morvan, Les fils du ciel (The Sons of Heaven), Calmann-Lévy, 2021
- Nokuthula Mazibuko Msimang, The Daughters of Nandi, 2022
