= Afrikaners =

Ethnic group in Southern Africa

- Flag used to represent Afrikaners at the UNPO

Total population
- c. 2.8–3.5 million

Regions with significant populations
- South Africa: 2,710,461 (2011)
- Namibia: 92,400 (2003)
- Zambia: ≈41,000 (2006) (Note: Ethnologue)
- United Kingdom: ≈40,000 (2006)
- Botswana: ≈20,000 (2010)
- Eswatini: ≈13,000 (2006)
- Australia: 6,153 (2021)
- New Zealand: 1,197 (2013) (Note: The 2013 New Zealand census records 1,197 New Zealand residents who explicitly identify as Afrikaner (that is, excluding those who identified as "African" or "South African"), while 27,387 identified as Afrikaans speakers.)
- Argentina: 650 (2019)

Languages
- First language Afrikaans; Second or third language: South African English; Bantu languages; Dutch; German

Religion
- Predominantly Reformed Christianity (see Afrikaner Calvinism; specifically: Dutch Reformed • Dutch Reformed of Africa • Reformed • Afrikaans Protestant); Minority; Irreligion (Atheism, Agnosticism) and Roman Catholicism

Related ethnic groups
- British diaspora in Africa; White Namibians; Dutch; Huguenots; Frisians; Flemings; German Namibians; Anglo-Indians; Indos; Cape Coloureds; Basters; Griquas; Oorlams

Afrikaners (Afrikaans: [afriˈkɑːnərs]) are a Southern African ethnic group descended from predominantly Dutch settlers who first arrived at the Cape of Good Hope in 1652. Until 1994, they dominated South Africa's politics as well as the country's commercial and agricultural sector.

Afrikaans, a language which evolved from the Dutch dialect of South Holland, is the mother tongue of Afrikaners and most Cape Coloureds. According to the South African National Census of 2022, 10.6% of South Africans spoke Afrikaans as a first language at home, making it the country's third-largest home language after Zulu and Xhosa.

The arrival of Portuguese explorer Vasco da Gama at Calicut, India, in 1498 opened a gateway of free access to Asia from Western Europe around the Cape of Good Hope. This access necessitated the founding and safeguarding of trade stations along the African and Asian coasts. The Portuguese landed in Mossel Bay in 1488, explored Table Bay two years later, and by 1510 had started raiding inland. Shortly afterwards, the Dutch Republic sent merchant vessels to India and, in 1602, founded the Dutch East India Company (Vereenigde Oostindische Compagnie; VOC). As the volume of traffic rounding the Cape increased, the VOC recognised its natural harbour as an ideal watering point for the long voyage around Africa to East Asia and established a victualling station there in 1652. VOC officials did not favour the permanent settlement of Europeans in their trading empire, although during the 140 years of Dutch rule many VOC servants retired or were discharged and remained as private citizens. Furthermore, the exigencies of supplying local garrisons and passing fleets compelled the administration to confer free status on employees and oblige them to become independent farmers.

Encouraged by the success of this experiment, the company extended free passage from 1685 to 1707 for Dutch families wishing to settle at the Cape. In 1688, it sponsored the settlement of 200 French Huguenot refugees forced into exile by the Edict of Fontainebleau. The terms under which the Huguenots agreed to immigrate were the same as those offered to other VOC subjects, including free passage and the requisite farm equipment on credit. Prior attempts at cultivating vineyards or exploiting olive groves for fruit had been unsuccessful, and it was hoped that Huguenot colonists accustomed to Mediterranean agriculture could succeed where the Dutch had failed. They were augmented by VOC soldiers returning from Asia, predominantly Germans channelled into Amsterdam by the company's extensive recruitment network and thence overseas. Despite their diverse nationalities, the colonists used a common language and adopted similar attitudes towards politics. The attributes they shared served as a basis for the evolution of Afrikaner identity and consciousness.

In the 20th century, Afrikaner nationalism took the form of political parties and closed societies, such as the Broederbond. In 1914, the National Party (NP) was founded to promote Afrikaner interests. After winning the 1948 general election, the party implemented a harsh policy of racial segregation (apartheid) and declared South Africa a republic in 1961. Following decades of domestic unrest and international sanctions that resulted in bilateral and multi-party negotiations to end apartheid, South Africa held its first non-racial elections under a universal franchise in 1994. As a result of this election, the NP was ousted from power, and was eventually dissolved in 2005.

== Nomenclature ==
The term "Afrikaner" currently denotes the politically, culturally, and socially dominant and majority group among white South Africans, or the Afrikaans-speaking population of Dutch origin. Their original progenitors, especially in paternal lines, also included smaller numbers of Flemish, French Huguenot, German, Danish, Norwegian, Swiss, and Swedish immigrants. Historically, the terms "burgher" and "Boer" have both been used to describe white Afrikaans-speakers as a group; neither is particularly objectionable, but "Afrikaner" has been considered a more appropriate term.

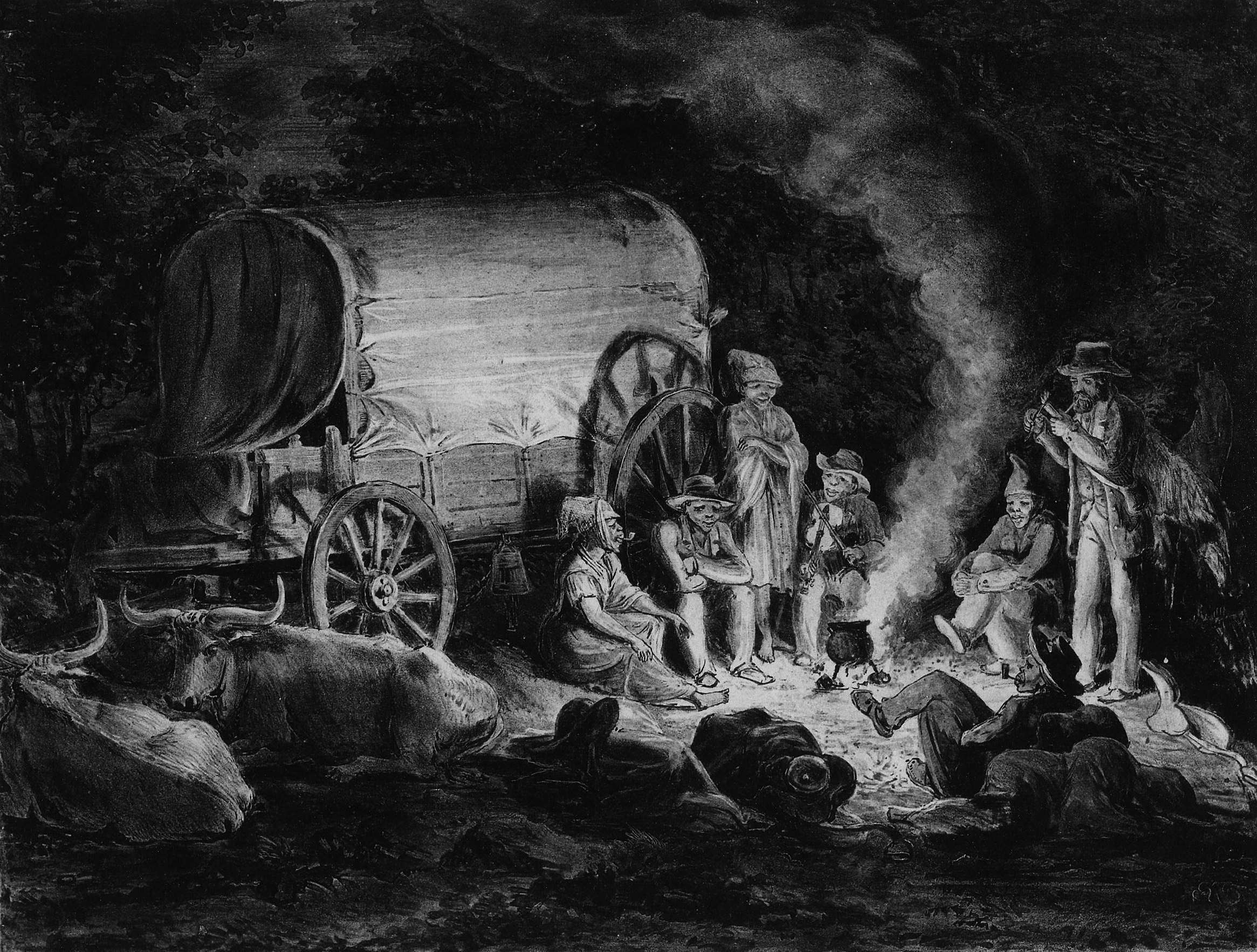
Mixed-race "Afrikander" Trekboer nomads in the Cape Colony, ancestral people to the Oorlam and Griqua migrations, produced in the 1890s

The term "Afrikaner" originally described mixed-race nomadic people in Southern Africa similar to Basters across Namibia and South Africa. Such groups include the Oorlam people under Oude Ram Afrikaner and Jager Afrikaner in the early 1700s, with the Oorlam continuing to use Afrikaner as a surname and subgroup of their people. The first recorded instance of a colonist identifying as an Afrikaner occurred in March 1707, during a disturbance in Stellenbosch. When the magistrate, Johannes Starrenburg, ordered an unruly crowd to desist, a young white man named Hendrik Biebouw retorted, "Ik wil niet loopen, ik ben een Afrikaander – al slaat de landdrost mij dood, of al zetten hij mij in de tronk, ik zal, nog wil niet zwijgen!" ("I will not leave, I am an African – even if the magistrate were to beat me to death or put me in jail, I shall not be, nor will I stay, silent!"). Biebouw was flogged for his insolence and later banished to Batavia (present-day Jakarta, Indonesia). The word Afrikaner is thought to have first been used to classify Cape Coloureds, or other groups of mixed-race ancestry. (Note: Such groups include the Oorlam people under Oude Ram Afrikaner and Jager Afrikaner, with many Oorlam continuing to use the term Afrikaner to describe themselves today.) Biebouw had numerous mixed-race siblings and may have identified with Coloureds socially. The growing use of the term appeared to express the rise of a new identity for white South Africans, suggesting for the first time a group identification with the Cape Colony rather than with an ancestral homeland in Europe.

By the late nineteenth century, the term was common language in both the Boer republics and the Cape Colony. At one time, burghers denoted Cape Dutch: those settlers who were influential in the administration, able to participate in urban affairs, and did so regularly. Boers often refer to settled ethnic European farmers or nomadic cattleherders. During the Batavian Republic of 1795–1806, burgher ('citizen') was popularised among Dutch communities both at home and abroad as a popular revolutionary form of address. In South Africa, it remained in use as late as the Second Boer War of 1899–1902. Afrikaner people are also commonly referred to as Afrikaans people.

== Population ==
=== 1691 estimates ===
Increase of European families in the Cape by year
Year	Number
1657–1675	46
1675–1700	154
1700–1725	263
1725–1750	272
1750–1775	400
1775–1795	391

Historical population
Year	Pop.	±% p.a.
1657	137	—
1754	6,000	+3.97%
1806	26,720	+2.91%
1936	1,120,770	+2.92%
1960	1,600,000	+1.49%
1985	2,581,080	+1.93%
1996	2,558,956	−0.08%
2001	2,576,184	+0.13%
2011	2,710,461	+0.51%
2022	2,512,096	−0.69%
Note: For the years 1985–2022, the census statistics show the number of Afrikaans-speaking whites. Considering that there is an increasingly significant number of English-speaking Afrikaners (especially after 2001), the numbers could be higher.

VOC initially had no intention of establishing a permanent Dutch settlement at the Cape of Good Hope; until 1657, it devoted as little attention as possible to the development or administration of the Dutch Cape Colony. From the VOC's perspective, there was little financial incentive to regard the region as anything more than the site of a strategic manufacturing centre. Furthermore, the Cape was unpopular among VOC employees, who regarded it as a barren and insignificant outpost with little opportunity for advancement.

A small number of longtime VOC employees who had been instrumental in the colony's founding and its first five years of existence, however, expressed interest in applying for grants of land with the objective of retiring at the Cape as farmers. In time, they came to form a class of former VOC employees, vrijlieden, also known as vrijburgers (free citizens, who stayed in Dutch territories overseas after serving their contracts). The vrijburgers were to be of Dutch birth (although exceptions were made for some Germans), married, "of good character", and had to undertake to spend at least twenty years in Southern Africa. In March 1657, when the first vrijburgers started receiving their farms, the white population of the Cape was only about 134. Although the soil and climate in Cape Town were suitable for farming, willing immigrants remained in short supply, including a number of orphans, refugees, and foreigners. From 1688 onward, the Cape attracted some French Huguenots, most of them refugees from the protracted conflict between Protestants and Catholics in France.

South Africa's white population in 1691 has been described as the Afrikaner "parent stock", as no significant effort was made to secure more colonist families after the dawn of the 18th century, and a majority of Afrikaners are descended from progenitors who arrived prior to 1700 in general and the late 1600s in particular. Although some two-thirds of this figure were Dutch-speaking Hollanders, there were at least 150 Huguenots and a nearly equal number of Low German speakers. Also represented in smaller numbers were Swedes, Danes, and Belgians.

White population in the Dutch Cape Colony, 1691
Ancestry	Percentage
Dutch	66.67%
French	16.67%
German	14.29%
Scandinavian, Belgian	2.37%
Note – Figures do not include expatriate soldiers, sailors, or servants of the company.

=== 1754 estimates ===
In 1754, Cape Governor Ryk Tulbagh conducted a census of his non-indigenous subjects. White vrijburgers - now outnumbered by slaves brought from West Africa, Mozambique, Madagascar and the Dutch East Indies - only totalled about 6,000.

=== 1806 estimates ===
Following the defeat and collapse of the Dutch Republic during Joseph Souham's Flanders Campaign, William V, Prince of Orange, escaped to the United Kingdom and appealed to the British to occupy his colonial possessions until he was restored. Holland's administration was never effectively reestablished; upon a new outbreak of hostilities with France, expeditionary forces led by Sir David Baird, 1st Baronet, finally permanently imposed British rule when they defeated Cape governor Jan Willem Janssens in 1806.

At the onset of Cape Town's annexation to the British Empire, the original Afrikaners numbered 26,720 – or 36% of the colony's population.

White population in the British Cape Colony, 1806
Ancestry	Percentage
Dutch	50.0%
German	27.0%
French	17.0%
Scandinavian, Belgian, other	5.5%
Note – Figures do not include expatriate soldiers or officials from other British possessions.

=== 1936 Census ===
The South African census of 1936 gave the following breakdown of language speakers of European origin.

Home language of people of European origin in 1936
Language	Cape of Good Hope	Natal	Transvaal	Orange Free State	Union of South Africa (total)	Percentage of total
Afrikaans	461,356	38,301	452,252	168,861	1,120,770	55.93%
English	297,077	141,550	318,090	26,354	783,071	39.08%
Afrikaans & English	19,698	3,727	23,192	3,794	50,411	2.52%
German	6,048	4,792	6,470	500	17,810	0.89%
Yiddish	4,745	299	11,528	1,112	17,684	0.88%
Dutch	826	175	2,740	167	3,908	0.19%
Greek	299	98	1,435	86	1,918	0.1%
Portuguese	158	67	1,510	8	1,743	0.09%
Italian	383	114	1,175	7	1,679	0.08%
French	189	815	423	18	1,445	0.07%
Other	578	548	1600	47	2,773	0.14%
Unspecified	217	63	341	24	645	0.03%

=== 1960 Census ===
The South African census of 1960 was the final census undertaken in the Union of South Africa. The ethno-linguistic status of some 15,994,181 South African citizens was projected by various sources through sampling language, religion, and race. At least 1.6 million South Africans were white Afrikaans speakers, or 10% of the total population. They also constituted 9.3% of the population in neighbouring South West Africa.

=== 1985 Census ===
According to the 1985 South African census, there were 2,581,080 white Afrikaans speakers then residing in the country, or about 9.4% of the total population.

=== 1996 Census ===
The South African National Census of 1996 was the first census conducted in post-apartheid South Africa. It was calculated on Census Day and reported a population of 2,558,956 white Afrikaans speakers. The census noted that Afrikaners represented the eighth largest ethnic group in the country, or 6.3% of the total population. Even after the end of apartheid, the ethnic group only fell by 25,000 people.

=== 2001 Census ===
The South African National Census of 2001 was the second census conducted in post-apartheid South Africa. It was calculated on 9 October and reported a population of 2,576,184 white Afrikaans speakers. The census noted that Afrikaners represented the eighth largest ethnic group in the country, or 5.7% of the total population.

==== Distribution ====
Distribution of Afrikaans versus English as home language of white South Africans. 87.5–100% Afrikaans 75–87.5% Afrikaans 62.5–75% Afrikaans 50–62.5% Afrikaans 50–62.5% English 62.5–75% English 75–87.5% English 87.5–100% English

Afrikaners make up approximately 58% of South Africa's white population, based on language used in the home. English speakers account for closer to 37%. As in Canada or the United States, most modern European immigrants elect to learn English and are more likely to identify with those descended from British colonials of the nineteenth century. Aside from coastal pockets in the Eastern Cape and KwaZulu-Natal they remain heavily outnumbered by those of Afrikaans origin.

Percentage of Afrikaners among white South Africans by province
Province	Afrikaners	% Afrikaners	All whites
Eastern Cape	149,395	48.8%	305,839
Free State	214,020	89.6%	238,789
Gauteng	984,472	56.7%	1,735,094
KwaZulu-Natal	115,721	24.0%	482,114
Limpopo	115,921	87.5%	132,421
Mpumalanga	164,620	83.5%	197,078
North West	237,598	89.0%	266,884
Northern Cape	93,637	91.3%	102,518
Western Cape	461,522	55.4%	832,899
Total	2,536,906	59.1%	4,293,636

=== 2011 Census ===
The South African National Census of 2011 counted 2,710,461 white South Africans who speak Afrikaans as a first language, or approximately 5.23% of the total South African population. The census also showed an increase of 5.21% in Afrikaner population compared to the previous, 2001 census.

== History ==
=== Early Dutch settlement ===
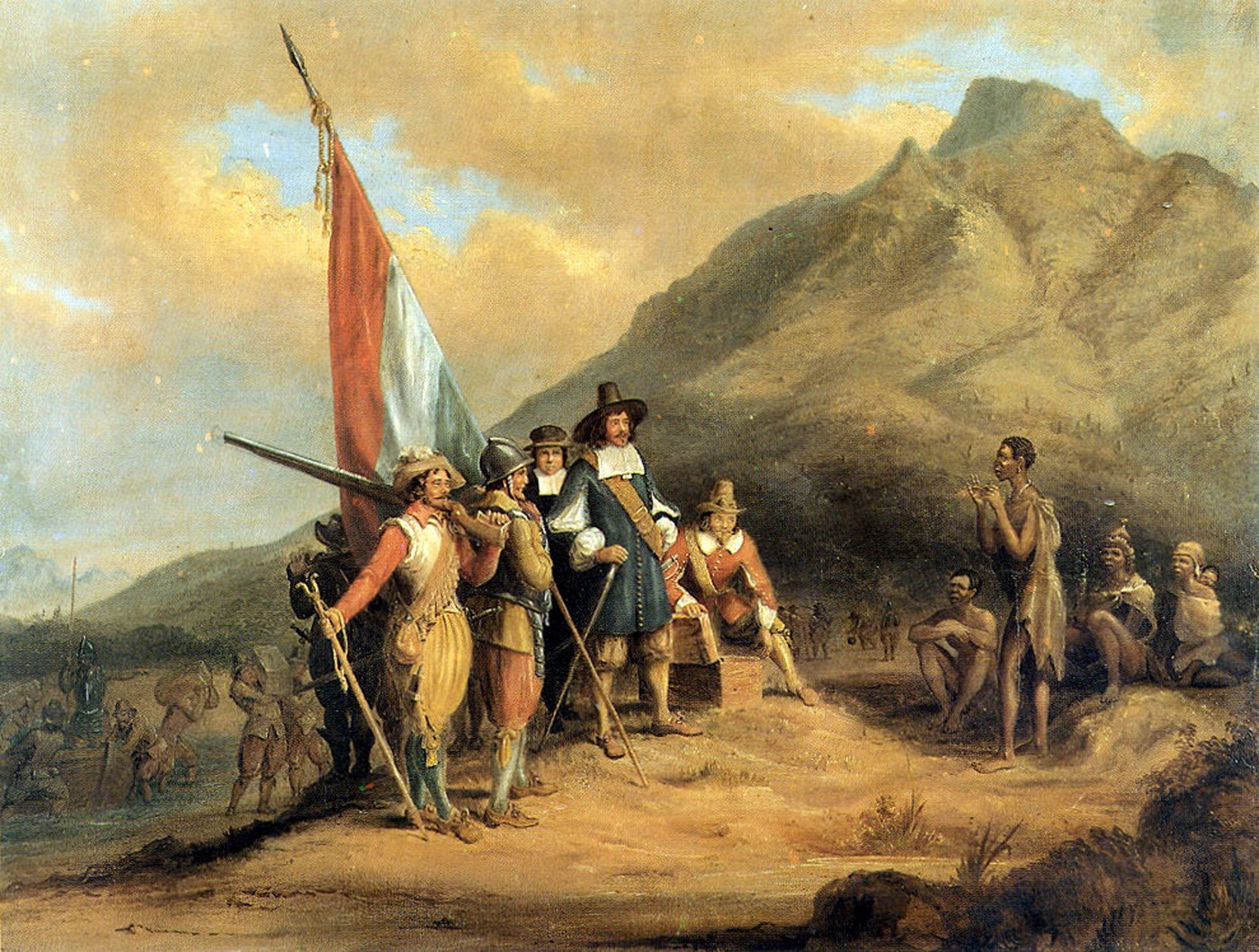
Painting of the arrival of Jan van Riebeeck

The earliest Afrikaner communities in South Africa were formed at the Cape of Good Hope, mainly through the introduction of Dutch colonists, French Huguenot refugees and erstwhile servants of the Dutch East India Company. During the early colonial period, Afrikaners were generally known as "Christians", "colonists", "emigrants", or ingezeetenen ("inhabitants"). Their concept of being rooted in Africa—as opposed to the company's expatriate officialdom—did not find widespread expression until the late eighteenth century.

It is to the ambitions of Prince Henry the Navigator that historians attribute the discovery of the Cape as a settling ground for Europeans. In 1424 Henry and Fernando de Castro besieged the Canary Islands, under the impression that they might be of use to further Portuguese expeditions around Africa's coast. Although this attempt was unsuccessful, Portugal's continued interest in the continent made possible the later voyages of Bartholomew Dias in 1487 and Vasco de Gama ten years later. Dias made known to the world a "Cape of Storms", rechristened "Good Hope" by John II. As it was desirable to take formal possession of this territory the Portuguese erected a stone cross in Algoa Bay. Da Gama and his successors, however, did not take kindly to the notion, especially following a skirmish with the Khoikhoi in 1497, when one of his admirals was wounded.

After the British East India Company was founded in 1599, London merchants began to take advantage of the route to India by the Cape. James Lancaster, who had visited Robben Island some years earlier, anchored in Table Bay during the company's first voyage in 1601. By 1614 the British had planted a penal colony on the site, and in 1621 two Englishmen claimed Table Bay on behalf of King James I, but this action was not ratified. They eventually settled on Saint Helena as an alternative port of refuge.

Due to the value of the spice trade between Europe and their outposts in the East Indies, Dutch ships began to call sporadically at the Cape in search of provisions after 1598. In 1601 a Captain Paul van Corniden came ashore at St. Sebastion's Bay near Overberg. He discovered a small inlet which he named Vleesch Bay, after the cattle trade, and another Visch Bay after the abundance of fish. Not long afterwards, Admiral Joris van Spilbergen reported catching penguins and sheep on Robben Island.

In 1648, Dutch sailors Leendert Jansz and Nicholas Proot had been shipwrecked in Table Bay and marooned for five months until picked up by a returning ship. During this period they established friendly relations with the locals, who sold them sheep, cattle, and vegetables. Both men presented a report advocating the Table valley as a fort and garden for the East India fleets.

We say, therefore, that the Honourable Company, by the formation of a fort or redoubt, and also of a garden of such size as may be practicable or necessary at the above-mentioned Cabo de Boa Esperanza, upon a suitable spot in Table Valley, stationing there according to your pleasure sixty to seventy as well soldiers as sailors, and a few persons acquainted with gardening and horticulture, could raise, as well for the ships and people bound to India as for those returning thence, many kinds of fruit, as will hereafter be more particularly demonstrated.

— Excerpt from Jansz and Proot's report.

Under recommendation from Jan van Riebeeck, the Heeren XVII authorised the establishment of a fort at the Cape, and this the more hurriedly to preempt any further imperial manoeuvres by Britain, France or Portugal. Van Riebeeck, his family and seventy to eighty VOC personnel arrived there on 6 April 1652 after a journey of three and a half months. Their immediate task was the establishment of some gardens, "taking for this purpose all the best and richest ground"; following this they were instructed to conduct a survey to determine the best pastureland for the grazing of cattle. By 15 May they had nearly completed construction on the Castle of Good Hope, which was to be an easily defensible victualing station serving Dutch ships plying the Indian Ocean. Dutch sailors appreciated the mild climate at the Cape, which allowed them to recuperate from their protracted periods of service in the tropical humidity of Southeast Asia. VOC fleets bearing cargo from the Orient anchored in the Cape for a month, usually from March or April, when they were resupplied with water and provisions prior to completing their return voyage to the Netherlands.

In extent the new refreshment post was to be kept as confined as possible to reduce administrative expense. Residents would associate amiably with the natives for the sake of livestock trade, but otherwise keep to themselves and their task of becoming self-sufficient. As the VOC's primary goal was merchant enterprise, particularly its shipping network traversing the Atlantic and Indian Oceans between the Netherlands and various ports in Asia, most of its territories consisted of coastal forts, factories, and isolated trading posts dependent entirely on indigenous host states. The exercise of Dutch sovereignty, as well the large scale settlement of Dutch colonists, was therefore extremely limited at these sites. During the VOC's history only two primary exceptions to the rule emerged: the Dutch East Indies and the Cape of Good Hope, through the formation of a large class of "vrijlieden", or "vrijburgers" (free citizens).

The VOC operated under a strict corporate hierarchy which allowed it to formally assign classifications to those whom it determined fell within its legal purview. Most Europeans within the VOC's registration and identification system were denoted either as Company employees or vrijburgers. The legal classifications imposed upon every individual in the Company possessions determined their position in society and conferred restraints upon their actions. VOC ordinances made a clear distinction between the "bonded" period of service, and the period of "freedom" that began once an employment contract ended. In order to ensure former employees could be distinguished from workers still in the service of the company, it was decided to provide them a "letter of freedom", a licence known as a vrijbrief. European employees were repatriated to the Netherlands upon the termination of their contract, unless they successfully applied for a vrijbrief, in which they were charged a small fee and registered as vrijburgers in a Company record known collectively as the vrijboeken. Fairly strict conditions were levied on those who aspired to become vrijburgers at the Cape of Good Hope. They had to be married Dutch citizens who were regarded as being "of good character" by the VOC and committed to at least twenty years' residence in South Africa. Reflecting the multi-national nature of the workforce of the early modern trading companies, some foreigners, particularly Germans, were open to consideration as well. If their application for vrijburger status was successful, the Company granted them plots of farmland of thirteen and a half morgen, which were tax exempt for twelve years. They were also loaned tools and seeds. The extent of their farming activities, however, remained heavily regulated: for example, the vrijburgers were ordered to focus on the cultivation of grain. Each year their harvest was to be sold exclusively to the VOC at fixed prices. They were forbidden from growing tobacco, producing vegetables for any purpose other than personal consumption, or purchasing cattle from the native Khoikhoi at rates which differed from those set by the VOC. With time, these restrictions and other attempts by the VOC to control the settlers resulted in successive generations of vrijburgers and their descendants becoming increasingly localised in their loyalties and national identity and hostile towards the colonial government.

Around March 1657, Rijcklof van Goens, a senior VOC officer appointed as commissioner to the fledgling Dutch Cape Colony, ordered Jan van Riebeeck to help more employees succeed as vrijburgers so the company could save on their wages. Although an overwhelming majority of the vrijburgers were farmers, some also stated their intention to seek employment as farm managers, fishermen, wagon-makers, tailors, or hunters. A ship's carpenter was granted a tract of forest, from which he was permitted to sell timber, and one miller from Holland opened his own water-operated corn mill, the first of its kind in Southern Africa. The colony initially did not do well, and many of the discouraged vrijburgers returned to VOC service or sought passage back to the Netherlands to pursue other opportunities. Vegetable gardens were frequently destroyed by storms, and cattle lost in raids by the Khoikhoi, who were known to the Dutch as Hottentots. There was also an unskilled labour shortage, which the VOC later resolved by importing slaves from Angola, Madagascar, and the East Indies.

In 1662 van Riebeeck was succeeded by Zacharias Wagenaer as governor of the Cape. Wagenaer was somewhat aloof towards the vrijburgers, whom he dismissed as "sodden, lazy, clumsy louts...since they do not pay proper attention to the [slaves] lent to them, or to their work in the fields, nor to their animals, for that reason seem wedded to the low level and cannot rid themselves of their debts". When Wagenaer arrived, he observed that many of the unmarried vrijburgers were beginning to cohabit with their slaves, with the result that 75% of children born to Cape slaves at the time had a Dutch father. Wagenaer's response was to sponsor the immigration of Dutch women to the colony as potential wives for the settlers. Upon the outbreak of the Second Anglo-Dutch War, Wagenaer was perturbed by the British capture of New Amsterdam and attacks on other Dutch outposts in the Americas and on the west African coast. He increased the Cape garrison by about 300 troops and replaced the original earthen fortifications of the Castle of Good Hope with new ones of stone.

In 1672 there were 300 VOC officials, employees, soldiers and sailors at the Cape, compared to only about 64 vrijburgers, 39 of whom were married, with 65 children. By 1687 the number had increased to about 254 vrijburgers, of whom 77 were married, with 231 children. Simon van der Stel, who was appointed governor of the Cape in 1679, reversed the VOC's earlier policy of keeping the colony limited to the confines of the Cape peninsula itself and encouraged Dutch settlement further into the interior, resulting in the founding of Stellenbosch. Van der Stel persuaded 30 vrijburgers to settle in Stellenbosch and a few years afterwards the town received its own municipal administration and school. The VOC was persuaded to seek more prospective European immigrants for the Cape after local officials noted that the cost of maintaining gardens to provision passing ships could be eliminated by outsourcing to a greater number of vrijburgers. Furthermore, the size of the Cape garrison could be reduced if there were many colonists capable of being called up for militia service as needed.

Following the passage of the Edict of Fontainebleau, the Netherlands served as a major destination for French Huguenot refugees fleeing persecution at home. In April 1688, the VOC agreed to sponsor the resettlement of over 100 Huguenots at the Cape. Smaller numbers of Huguenots gradually arrived over the next decade, and by 1702 the community numbered close to 200. Between 1689 and 1707 they were augmented by additional numbers of Dutch settlers sponsored by the VOC with grants of land and free passage to Africa. Additionally, there were calls from the VOC administration to sponsor the immigration of more German settlers to the Cape, as long as they were Protestant. VOC pamphlets began circulating in German cities exhorting the urban poor to seek their fortune in southern Africa. Despite the increasing diversity of the colonial population, there was a degree of cultural assimilation due to intermarriage, and the almost universal adoption of the Dutch language. The use of other European languages was discouraged by a VOC edict declaring that Dutch should be the exclusive language of education, administrative record, and religious services. In 1752 the French astronomer Nicolas-Louis de Lacaille visited the Cape and observed that nearly all the third generation descendants of the original Huguenot and German settlers spoke Dutch as a first language.

=== Impact of the British occupation of the Cape ===
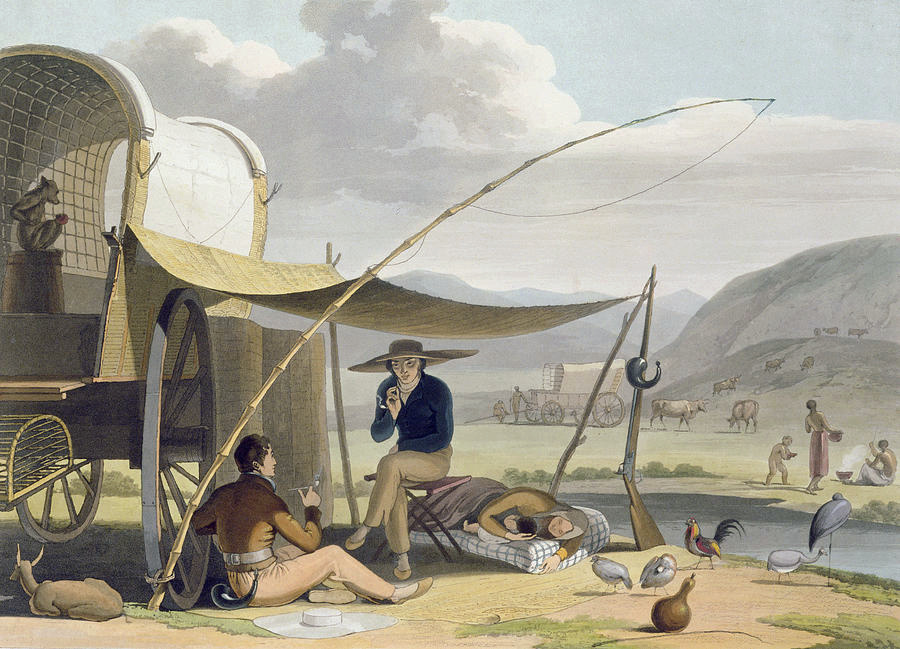
Trekboers making camp, an 1804 painting by Samuel Daniell.

Long before the British annexed the Cape Colony, there were already large Dutch-speaking European settlements in the Cape Peninsula and beyond; by the time British rule became permanent in 1806, these had a population of over 26,000. There were, however, two distinct subgroups in the vrijburger population settled under the VOC. The first were itinerant farmers who began to progressively settle further and further inland, seeking better pastures for their livestock and freedom from the VOC's regulations. This community of settlers collectively identified themselves as Boers to describe their agricultural way of life. Their farms were enormous by European standards, as the land was free and relatively underpopulated; they merely had to register them with the VOC, a process that was little more than a formality and became more irrelevant the further the Boers moved inland. A few Boers adopted a semi-nomadic lifestyle permanently and became known as trekboers. The Boers were deeply suspicious of the centralised government and increasing complexities of administration at the Cape; they constantly migrated further from the reaches of the colonial officialdom whenever it attempted to regulate their activities. By the mid-eighteenth century the Boers had penetrated almost a thousand kilometres into South Africa's interior beyond the Cape of Good Hope, at which point they encountered the Xhosa people, who were migrating southwards from the opposite direction. Competition between the two communities over resources on the frontier sparked the Xhosa Wars. Harsh Boer attitudes towards black Africans were permanently shaped by their contact with the Xhosa, which bred insecurity and fear on the frontier.

The second subgroup of the vrijburger population became known as the Cape Dutch and remained concentrated in the southwestern Cape and especially the areas closer to Cape Town. They were likelier to be urban dwellers, more educated, and typically maintained greater cultural ties to the Netherlands than the Boers. The Cape Dutch formed the backbone of the colony's market economy and included the small entrepreneurial class. These colonists had vested economic interests in the Cape peninsula and were not inclined to venture inland because of the great difficulties in maintaining contact with a viable market. This was in sharp contrast with the Boers on the frontier, who lived on the margins of the market economy. For this reason the Cape Dutch could not easily participate in migrations to escape the colonial system, and the Boer strategy of social and economic withdrawal was not viable for them. Their response to grievances with the Cape government was to demand political reform and greater representation, a practice that became commonplace under Dutch and subsequently British rule. In 1779, for example, hundreds of Cape burghers smuggled a petition to Amsterdam demanding an end to VOC corruption and contradictory laws. Unlike the Boers, the contact most Cape Dutch had with black Africans were predominantly peaceful, and their racial attitudes were more paternal than outright hostile.

Meanwhile, the VOC underwent a period of commercial decline beginning in the late eighteenth century which ultimately resulted in its bankruptcy. The company had suffered immense losses to its trade profits as a result of the Fourth Anglo-Dutch War and was heavily in debt with European creditors. In 1794, the Dutch government intervened and assumed formal administration of the Cape Colony. However, events at the Cape were overtaken by turmoil in the Netherlands, which was occupied by Napoleon during the Flanders Campaign. This opened the Cape to French naval fleets. To protect her own prosperous maritime shipping routes, Great Britain occupied the fledgling colony by force until 1803. From 1806 to 1814 the Cape was again governed as a British military dependency, whose sole importance to the Royal Navy was its strategic relation to Indian maritime traffic. The British formally assumed permanent administrative control around 1815, as a result of the Treaty of Paris.

Relations between some of the colonists and the new British administration quickly soured. The British brought more liberal attitudes towards slavery and treatment of the indigenous peoples to the Cape, which were utterly alien to the colonists. Furthermore, they insisted that the Cape Colony finance its own affairs by taxes levied on the white population, an unpopular measure which bred resentment. By 1812, new attorneys-general and judges had been imported from England and many of the preexisting VOC-era institutions abolished, namely the Dutch magistrate system and the only vestige of representative government at the Cape, the burgher senate. The new judiciary then established circuit courts, which brought colonial authority directly to the frontier. These circuit courts were permitted to try colonists for allegations of abuse of slaves or indentured servants. Most of those tried for these offences were frontier Boers; the charges were usually brought by British missionaries and the courts themselves staffed by unsympathetic and liberal Cape Dutch. The Boers, who perceived most of the charges levelled against them to be flimsy or exaggerated, often refused to answer their court summons.

In 1815, a Cape police unit was dispatched to arrest a Boer for failure to appear in court on charges of cruelty towards indentured Khoisan servants; the colonist fired on the troopers when they entered his property and was killed. The controversy which surrounded the incident led to the abortive Slachter's Nek Rebellion, in which a number of Boers took up arms against the British. British officials retaliated by hanging five Boers for insurrection. In 1828, the Cape governor declared that all native inhabitants but slaves were to have the rights of citizens, in respect of security and property ownership, on parity with whites. This had the effect of further alienating the Boers. Boer resentment of successive British administrators continued to grow throughout the late 1820s and early 1830s, especially with the official imposition of the English language. This replaced Dutch with English as the language used in the Cape's judicial system, putting the Boers at a disadvantage, as most spoke little or no English at all.

Bridling at what they considered an unwarranted intrusion into their way of life, some in the Boer community began to consider selling their farms and venturing deep into South Africa's unmapped interior to preempt further disputes and live completely independent from British rule. From their perspective, the Slachter's Nek Rebellion had demonstrated the futility of an armed uprising against the new order the British had entrenched at the Cape; one result was that the Boers who might have otherwise been inclined to take up arms began preparing for a mass emigration from the colony instead.

=== The Great Trek ===
In the 1830s and 1840s, an organised migration of an estimated 14,000 Boers, known as voortrekkers, across the Cape Colony's frontier began. The voortrekkers departed the colony in a series of parties, taking with them all their livestock and portable property, as well as slaves, and their dependents. They had the skills to maintain their own wagons and firearms, but remained dependent on equally mobile traders for vital commodities such as gunpowder and sugar. Nevertheless, one of their goals was to sever their ties with the Cape's commercial network by gaining access to foreign traders and ports in east Africa, well beyond the British sphere of influence.

Many of the Boers who participated in the Great Trek had varying motives. While most were driven by some form of disenchantment with British policies, their secondary objectives ranged from seeking more desirable grazing land for their cattle to a desire to retain slaves after the abolition of slavery at the Cape. The Great Trek also split the Afrikaner community along social and geographical lines, driving a wedge between the voortrekkers and those who remained in the Cape Colony. Only about a fifth of the colony's Dutch-speaking white population at the time participated in the Great Trek. The Dutch Reformed Church, to which most of the Boers belonged, condemned the migration. Despite their hostility towards the British, there were also some Boers who chose to remain in the Cape of their own accord. For its part, the distinct Cape Dutch community remained loyal to the British Crown and focused its efforts on building political organisations seeking representative government; its lobbying efforts were partly responsible for the establishment of the Cape Qualified Franchise in 1853.

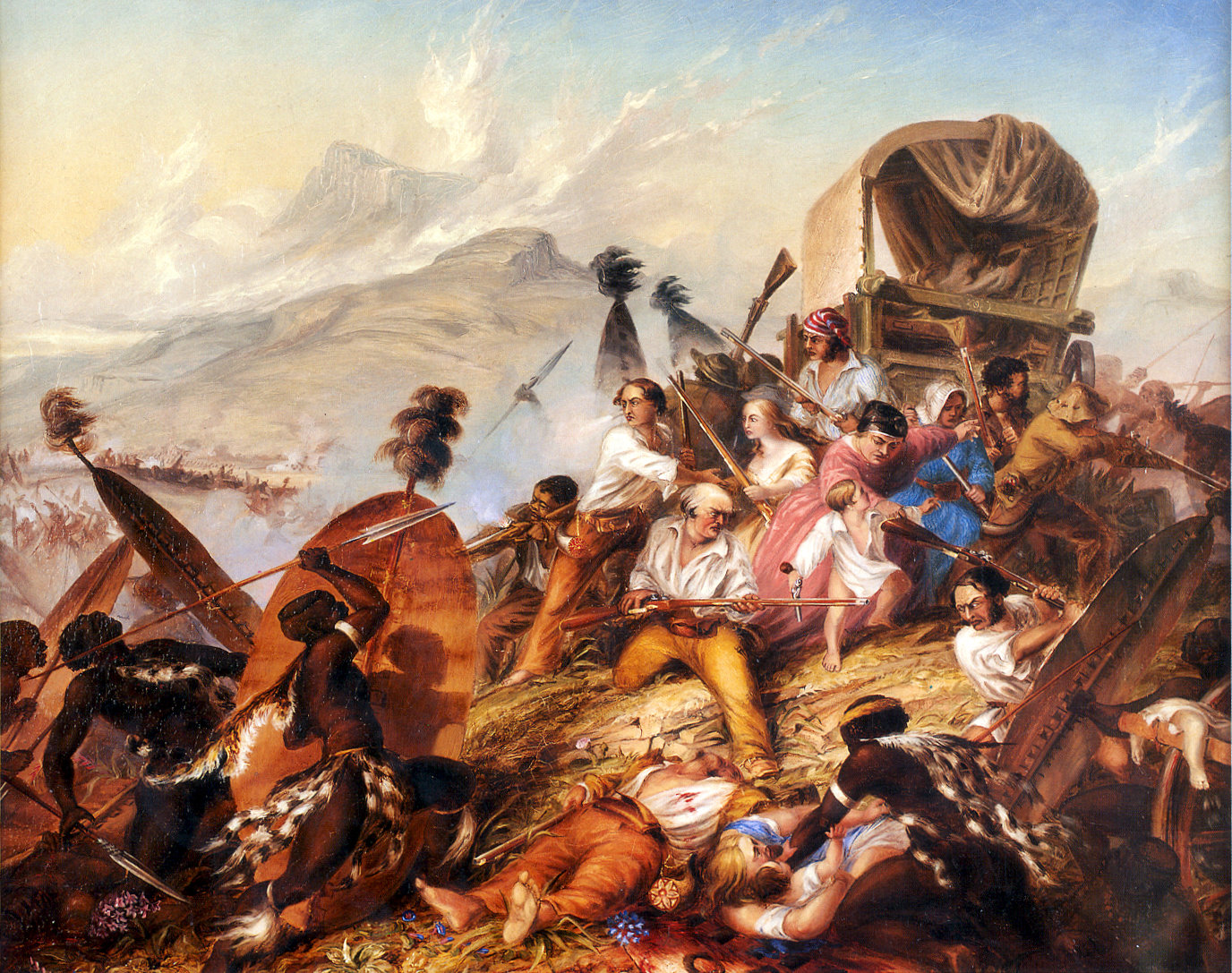
Weenen massacre: Zulus killed hundreds of Boer colonists (1838)

As important as the Trek was to the formation of Boer ethnic identity, so were the running conflicts with various indigenous groups along the way. One conflict central to the construction of Boer identity occurred with the Zulu in the area of present-day KwaZulu-Natal.

The Boers who entered Natal discovered that the land they wanted came under the authority of the Zulu King Dingane kaSenzangakhona, who ruled that part of what subsequently became KwaZulu-Natal. The British had a small port colony (the future Durban) there but were unable to seize the whole area from the war-ready Zulus and only kept to the Port of Natal. The Boers found the land safe from the British and sent an unarmed Boer land treaty delegation under Piet Retief on 6 February 1838, to negotiate with the Zulu King. The negotiations went well, and a contract between Retief and Dingane was signed.

However, the agreement between Retief's and Dingane's people was that no weapons would be present during their negotiation time. Dingane and his people did not keep to this treaty, kicked their assegaai's from their buried hiding places, and killed the members of the delegation while they were still in the kraal; a large-scale massacre of the Boers followed: see Weenen massacre. Zulu izibutho ('regiments') attacked Boer encampments in the Drakensberg foothills at what was later called Blaauwkrans and Weenen, killing women and children along with men. (By contrast, in earlier conflicts the trekkers had experienced along the eastern Cape frontier, the Xhosa had refrained from harming women and children.)

A commando of 470 men arrived to help the settlers. On 16 December 1838, the Voortrekkers under the command of Andries Pretorius confronted about 10,000 Zulus at the prepared positions. The Boers had three injuries without any fatalities. Due to the blood of 3,000 slain Zulus that stained the Ncome River, the conflict afterwards became known as the Battle of Blood River.

In present-day South Africa, 16 December remains a celebrated public holiday, initially called "Dingane's Day". After 1952, the holiday was officially recognised and named the Day of the Covenant, changed to Day of the Vow "Geloftedag" in 1980 (Mackenzie 1999:69) and, after the abolition of apartheid, to Day of Reconciliation in 1994. The Boers saw their victory at the Battle of Blood River as evidence that they had found divine favour from The Lord for their exodus from British rule.

=== Boer republics ===
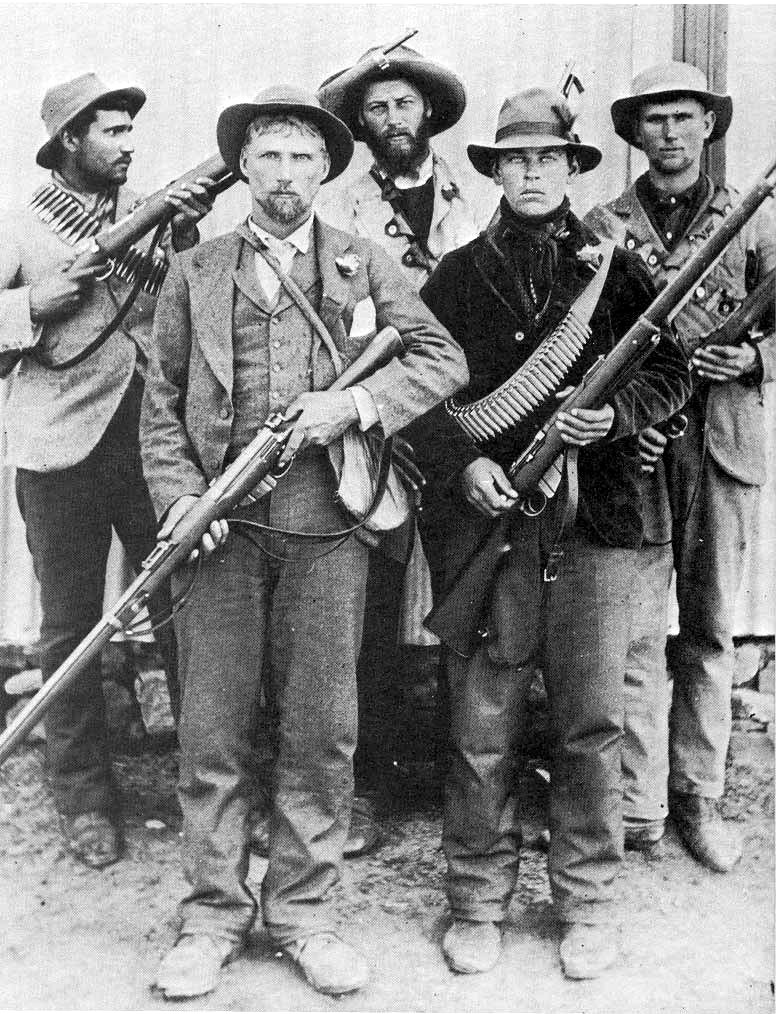
Boer guerrillas during the Second Boer War

After defeating the Zulu and the recovery of the treaty between Dingane and Retief, the Voortrekkers proclaimed the Natalia Republic. In 1843, Britain annexed Natal and many Boers trekked inwards again.

Due to the return of British rule, Boers fled to the frontiers to the north-west of the Drakensberg mountains, and onto the highveld of the Transvaal and Transoranje. These areas were mostly unoccupied due to conflicts in the course of the genocidal Mfecane wars of the Zulus on the local Basuthu population who used it as summer grazing for their cattle. Some Boers ventured beyond the present-day borders of South Africa, north as far as present-day Zambia and Angola. Others reached the Portuguese colony of Delagoa Bay, later called Lourenço Marques and subsequently Maputo – the capital of Mozambique.

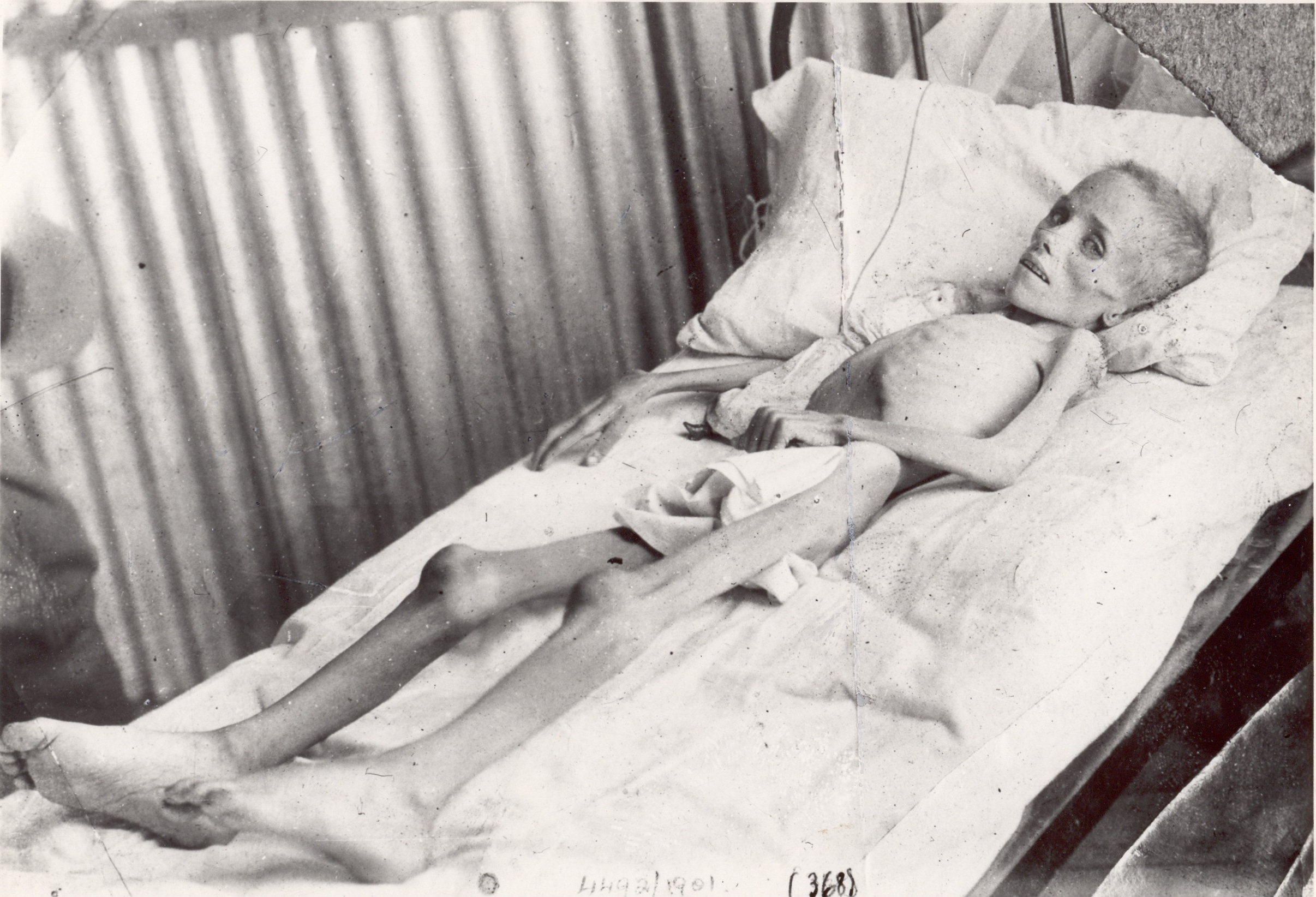
Lizzie van Zyl, visited by Emily Hobhouse in a British concentration camp

A significant number of Afrikaners also went as Dorsland Trekkers to Angola, where a large group settled on the Huíla Plateau, in Humpata, and smaller communities on the Central Highlands. They constituted a closed community which rejected integration as well as innovation, became impoverished in the course of several decades, and returned to South West Africa and South Africa in waves.

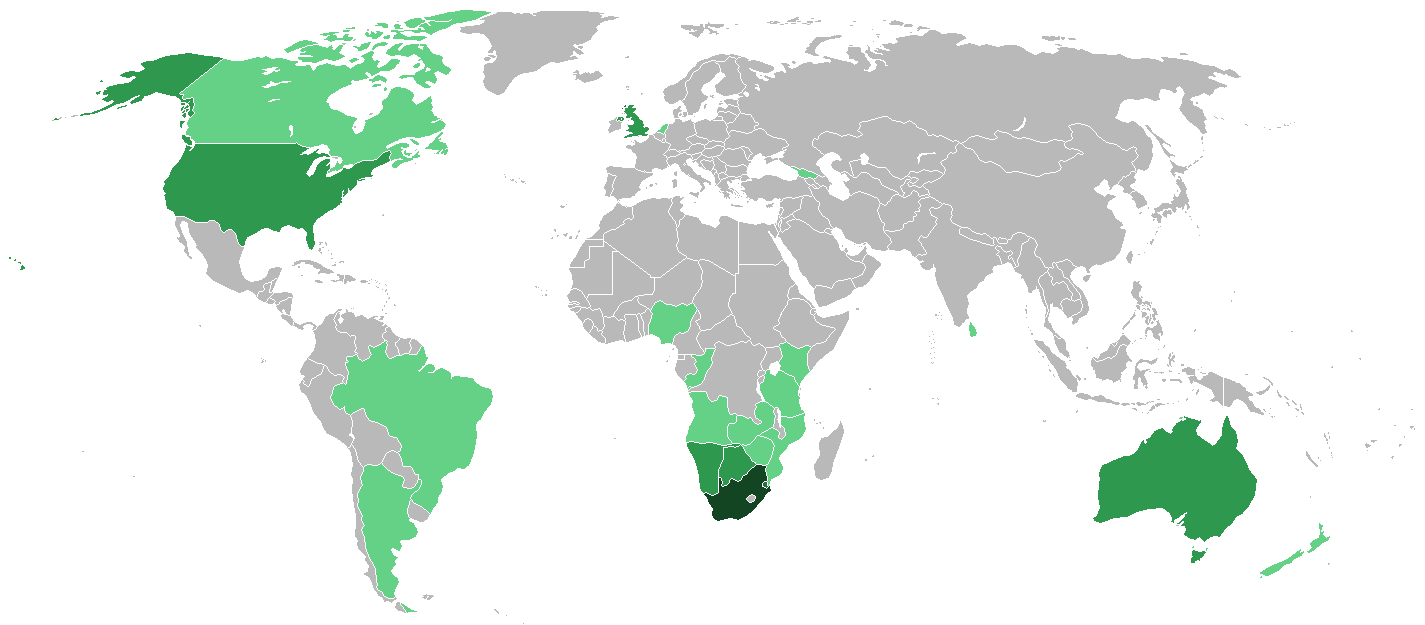
Afrikaner diaspora in Africa and the world. unavailable < 10,000 10,000+ 1,000,000+

The Boers created sovereign states in what is now South Africa: de Zuid-Afrikaansche Republiek (the South African Republic) and the Orange Free State were the most prominent and lasted the longest.

The discovery of goldfields awakened British interest in the Boer republics, and the two Boer Wars resulted: The First Boer War (1880–1881) and the Second Boer War (1899–1902). The Boers won the first war and retained their independence. The second ended with British victory and annexation of the Boer areas into the British colonies. The British employed scorched earth tactics and held many Boers in concentration camps as a means to separate commandos from their source of shelter, food and supply. The strategy had its intended effect, but an estimated 27,000 Boers (mainly women and children under sixteen), about 50% of the Boer population died in these camps from hunger and disease.

=== Post Boer War diaspora ===
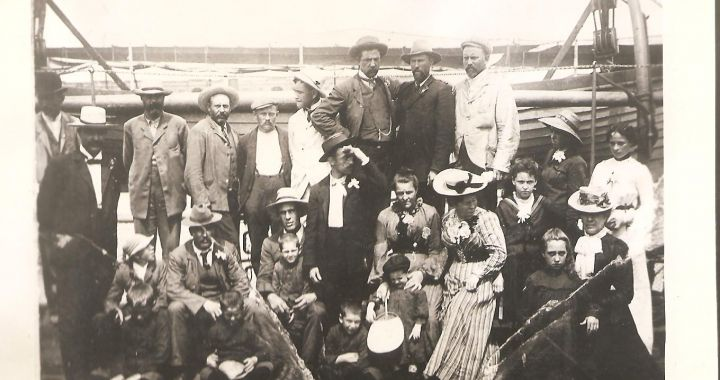
Landing of Boer settlers in Chubut, Argentina.

In the 1890s, some Boers trekked into Mashonaland, where they were concentrated at the town of Enkeldoorn, now Chivhu. After the second Boer War, more Boers left South Africa. Starting in 1902 to 1908 a large group of around 650 Afrikaners emigrated to the Patagonia region of Argentina, under the leadership Louis Baumann and the Italian Camillo Ricchiardi (most notably to the towns of Comodoro Rivadavia and Sarmiento), choosing to settle there due to its similarity to the Karoo region of South Africa.

Another group emigrated to British-ruled Kenya, from where most returned to South Africa during the 1930s as a result of warfare there amongst indigenous people. A third group, under the leadership of General Ben Viljoen, emigrated to Chihuahua in northern Mexico and to the states of Arizona, California, New Mexico and Texas in the south-western US. Others migrated to other parts of Africa, including German East Africa (present day Tanzania, mostly near Arusha).

Brazil is the country in Latin America with the largest community of Afrikaners, they mostly live in Southeastern Brazil, the most populous area of the country. In 2020, they numbered 2,895 people.

A relatively large group of Boers settled in Kenya. The first wave of migrants consisted of individual families, followed by larger multiple-family treks. Some had arrived by 1904, as documented by the caption of a newspaper photograph noting a tent town for "some of the early settlers from South Africa" on what became the campus of the University of Nairobi. Probably the first to arrive was W.J. van Breda (1903), followed by John de Waal and Frans Arnoldi at Nakuru (1906). Jannie De Beer's family resided at Athi River, while Ignatius Gouws resided at Solai.

The second wave of migrants is exemplified by Jan Janse van Rensburg's trek. Janse van Rensburg left the Transvaal on an exploratory trip to British East Africa in 1906 from Lourenço Marques (then Portuguese), Mozambique. Van Rensburg was inspired by an earlier Boer migrant, Abraham Joubert, who had moved to Nairobi from Arusha in 1906, along with others. When Joubert visited the Transvaal that year, van Rensburg met with him. Sources disagree about whether van Rensburg received guarantees for land from the Governor of the East Africa Protectorate, Sir James Hayes Sadler.

On his return to the Transvaal, van Rensburg recruited about 280 Afrikaners (comprising either 47 or 60 families) to accompany him to British East Africa. On 9 July 1908 his party sailed in the chartered ship SS Windhuk from Lourenço Marques to Mombasa, from where they boarded a train for Nairobi. The party travelled by five trains to Nakuru.

In 1911, the last of the large trek groups departed for Kenya, when some 60 families from the Orange Free State boarded the SS Skramstad in Durban under leadership of C.J. Cloete. But migration dwindled, partly due to the British secretary of state's (then Lord Crewe) cash requirements for immigrants. When the British granted self-government to the former Boer republics of the Transvaal and the Orange Free State in 1906 and 1907, respectively, the pressure for emigration decreased. A trickle of individual trekker families continued to migrate into the 1950s.

A combination of factors spurred on Boer migration. Some, like van Rensburg and Cloete, had collaborated with the British, or had surrendered during the Boer War. These joiners and hensoppers ("hands-uppers") subsequently experienced hostility from other Afrikaners. Many migrants were extremely poor and had subsisted on others' property. Collaborators tended to move to British East Africa, while those who had fought to the end (called bittereinders, "bitter-enders") initially preferred German South West Africa.

One of the best known Boer settlements in the British East Africa Protectorate became established at Eldoret, in the south west of what became known as Kenya in 1920. By 1934, some 700 Boers lived here, near the Ugandan border.

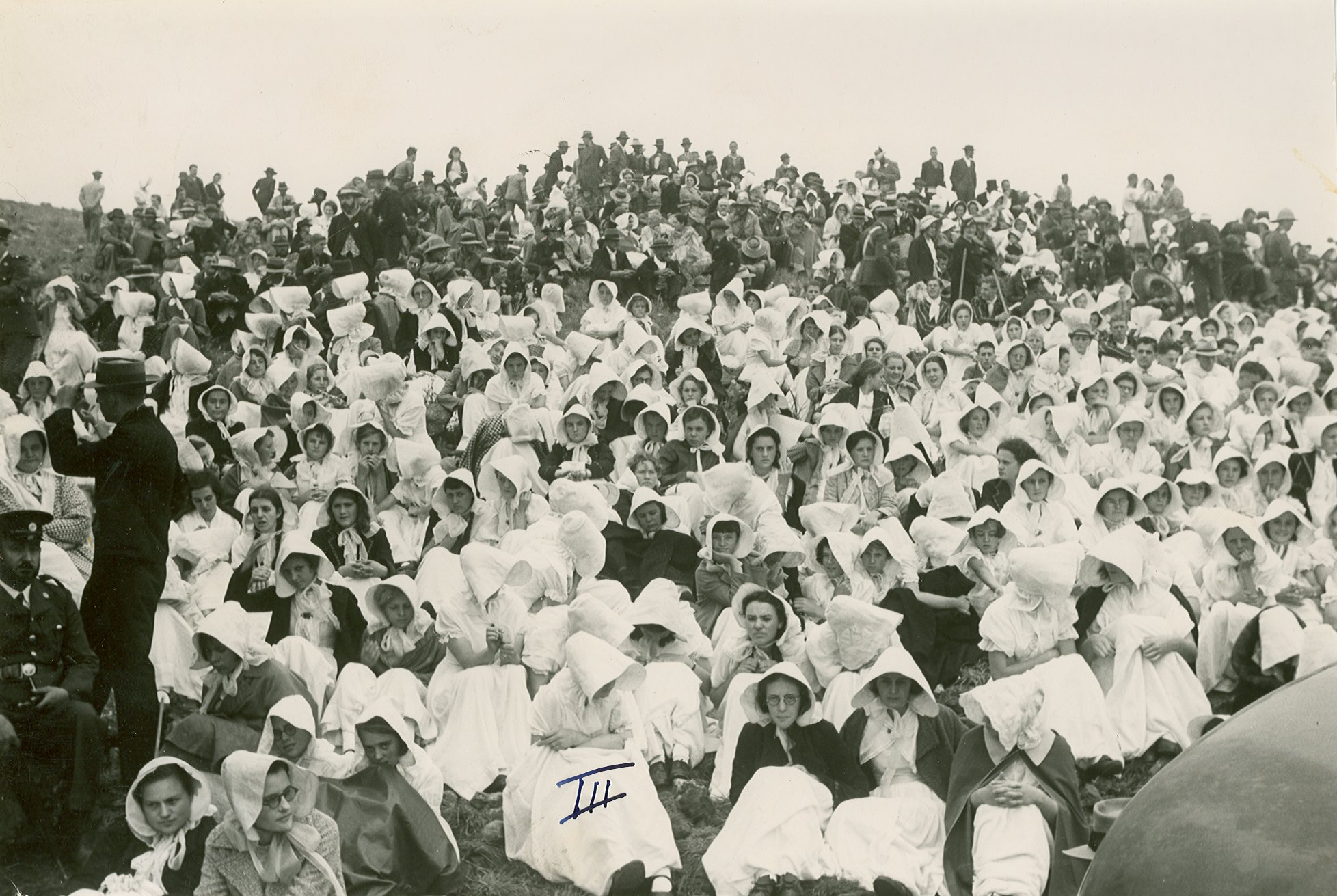
Afrikaners in Voortrekker attire in 1938.

=== South West Africa ===
With the onset of the First World War in 1914, the Allies asked the Union of South Africa to attack the German territory of South West Africa, resulting in the South West Africa Campaign (1914–1915). Armed forces under the leadership of General Louis Botha defeated the German forces, who were unable to put up much resistance to the overwhelming South African forces.

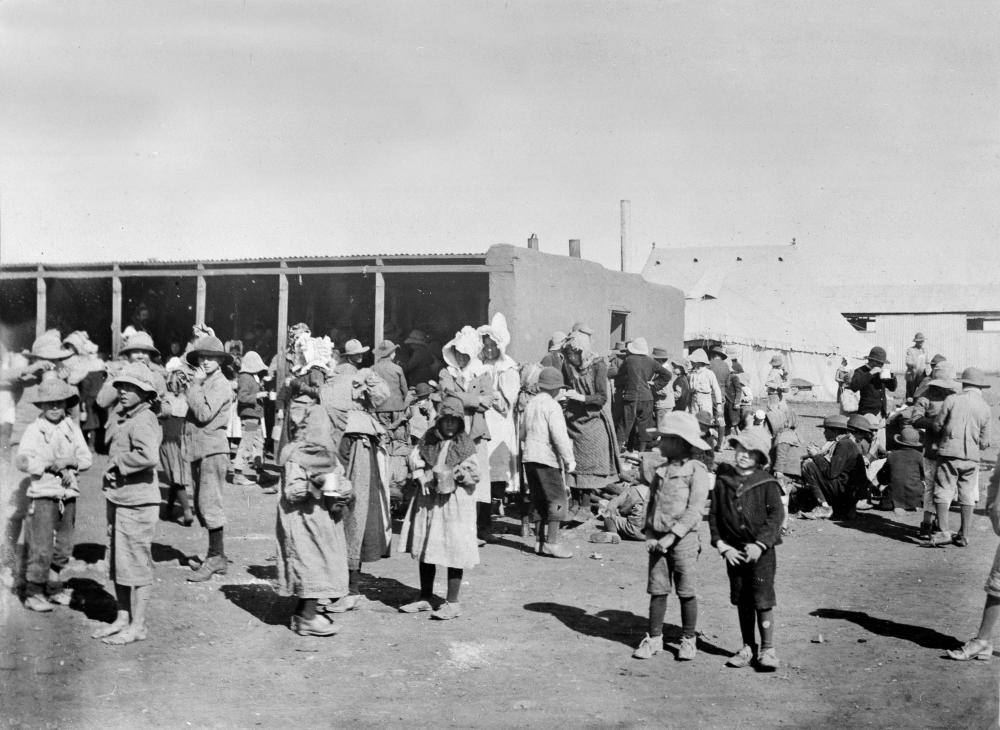
Boer women and children in British concentration camps

Many Boers, who had little love or respect for Britain, objected to the use of the "children from the concentration camps" to attack the anti-British Germans, resulting in the Maritz Rebellion of 1914, which was quickly quelled by the government forces.

Some Boers subsequently moved to South West Africa, which was administered by South Africa until its independence in 1990, after which the country adopted the name Namibia.

== Genealogy ==
Scholars have traditionally considered Afrikaners to be a homogeneous population of Dutch ancestry, subject to a significant founder effect. This viewpoint has been complicated by recent studies suggesting multiple uncertainties regarding the genetic composition of white South Africans at large and Afrikaners in particular.

Afrikaners are descended, to varying degrees, from Dutch, German and French Huguenot immigrants, along with minor percentages of other Europeans and indigenous African peoples. The first mixed race marriage which took place in Cape Town in 1664 was that of Krotoa, a Khoi woman, and Peder Havgaard, a Danish surgeon. Krotoa and Peder's descendants are the Pelzer, Kruger, Steenkamp and other Afrikaner families. Although the Cape Colony was administered and initially settled by VOC, a number of foreigners also boarded ships in the Netherlands to settle there. Their numbers can be reconstructed from censuses of the Cape rather than passenger lists, taking into account VOC employees who later returned to Europe. Some Europeans also arrived from elsewhere in Holland's sphere, especially German soldiers being discharged from colonial service. As a result, by 1691 over a quarter of the white population of South Africa was not ethnically Dutch. The number of permanent settlers of both sexes and all ages, according to figures available at the onset of British rule, numbered 26,720, of whom 50% were Dutch, 27% German, 17% French and 5.5% other. This demographic breakdown of the community just prior to the end of the Dutch administration has been used in many subsequent studies to represent the ethnic makeup of modern Afrikaners, a practise criticised by some academics such as Dr. Johannes Heese.

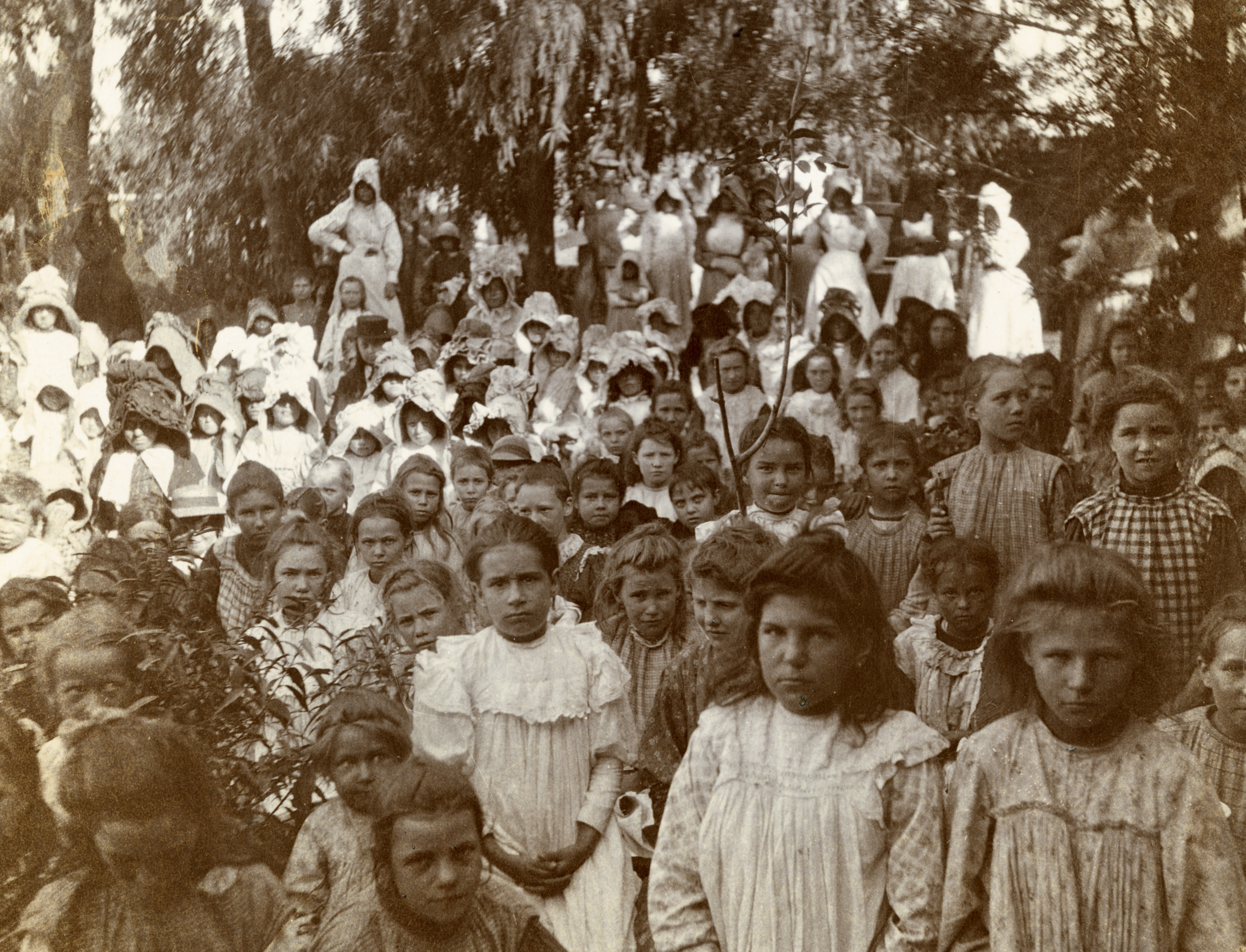
Boer children, c. 1901

Based on Heese's genealogical research of the period from 1657 to 1867, his study Die Herkoms van die Afrikaners ("The Origins of the Afrikaners") estimated an average ethnic admixture for Afrikaners of 35.5% Dutch, 34.4% German, 13.9% French, 7.2% non-European, 2.6% English, 2.8% other European and 3.6% unknown. Heese reached this conclusion by recording all the wedding dates and number of children of each immigrant. He then divided the period between 1657 and 1867 into six thirty-year blocs, and working under the assumption that earlier colonists contributed more to the gene pool, multiplied each child's bloodline by 32, 16, 8, 4, 2 and 1 according to respective period. Heese argued that previous studies wrongly classified some German progenitors as Dutch, although for the purposes of his own study he also reclassified a number of Scandinavian (especially Danish) progenitors as German. Drawing heavily on Christoffel Coetzee de Villiers' Geslacht Register der Oude Kaapsche Familien, British historian George McCall Theal estimated an admixture of 67% Dutch, with a nearly equal contribution of roughly 17% from the Huguenots and Germans. Theal argued that most studies suggesting a higher percentage of German ancestry among Afrikaners wrongly counted as "German" all those who came from German-speaking Swiss cantons or the Baltics and ignored the VOC's policy of recruiting settlers among the Dutch diaspora living in the border regions of several German states.

The degree of intermixing among Afrikaners may be attributed to the unbalanced sex ratio which existed under Dutch governance. Only a handful of VOC employees who sailed from the Netherlands were allowed to bring their families with them, and the Dutch never employed European women in a full-time capacity. Between 1657 and 1806 no more than 454 women arrived at the Cape, as compared to the 1,590 male colonists. One of the most fundamental demographic consequences was that white South African women, much like their counterparts in colonial North America, began to marry much younger and consequently bear more children than Western Europeans. Another was the high occurrence of inter-family marriages from the matrilineal aspect. These were reinforced by the familial interdependence of the Cape's credit and mortgage obligations. Afrikaner families thus became larger in size, more interconnected, and clannish than those of any other colonial establishment in the world. Some of the more common Afrikaner surnames include Botha, Pretorius and van der Merwe. As in other cases where large population groups have been propagated by a relatively small pool of progenitors, Afrikaners have also experienced an increase in the frequency of some otherwise rare deleterious ailments, including variegate porphyria and familial hypercholesterolaemia.

=== Non-European ancestry ===
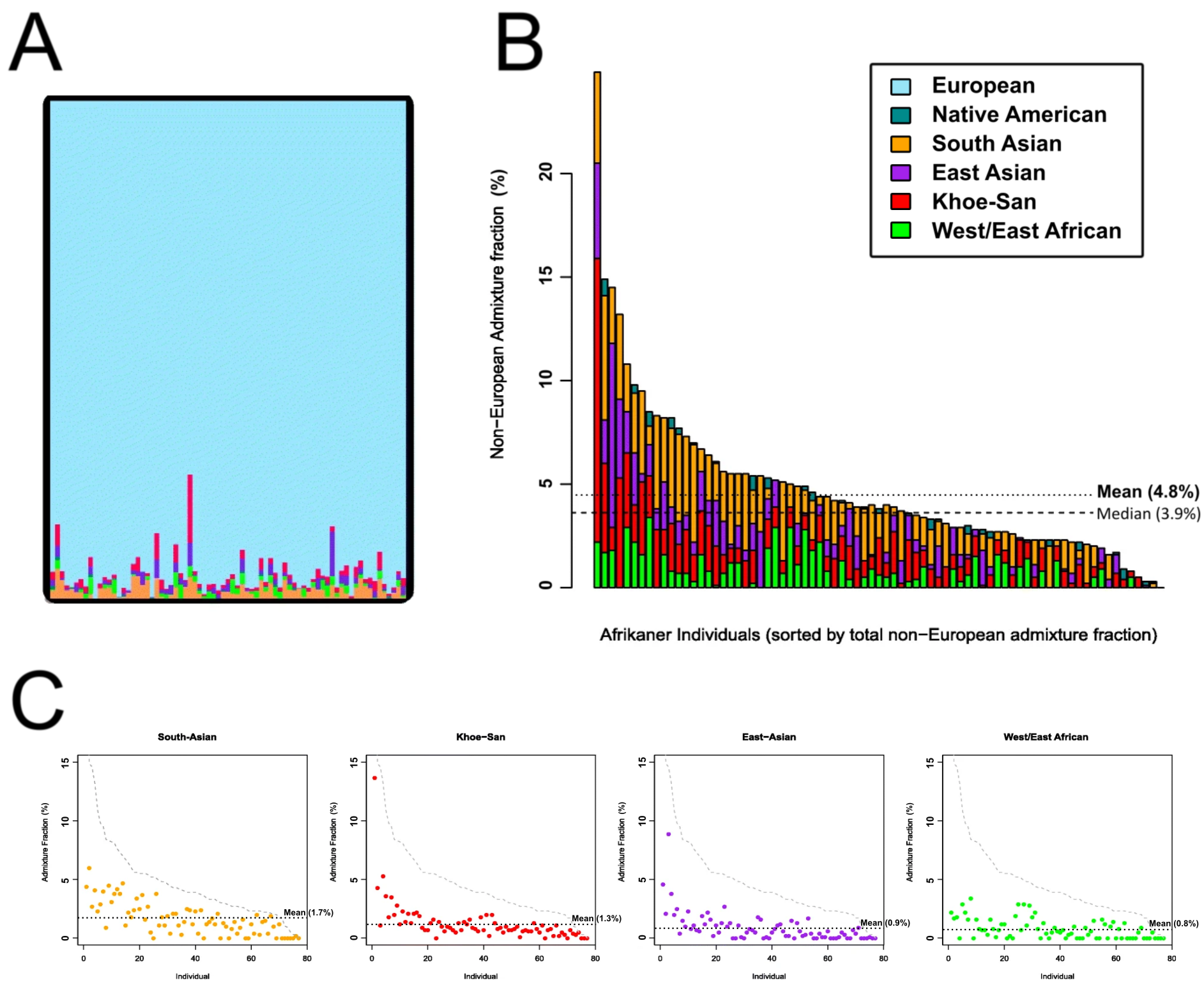
Admixture analysis of 77 Afrikaners.

According to a genetic study in February 2019, almost all Afrikaners have admixture from non-Europeans. The total amount of non-European ancestry - on average - is 4.8%, of which 2.1% are of African ancestry and 2.7% Asian/Native American ancestry. Among the 77 Afrikaners investigated, 6.5% had more than 10% non-European admixture, 27.3% had between 5 and 10%, 59.7% had between 1 and 5%, and 6.5% below 1%. It appears that some 3.4% of the non-European admixture can be traced to enslaved peoples who were brought to the Cape from other regions during colonial times. Only 1.38% of the admixture is attributed to the local Khoisan people.

== Black Afrikaners ==
Approximately 100 black families who identify as Afrikaners live in the settlement of Onverwacht, established in 1886 near the mining town of Cullinan. Members of the community descend from the freed slaves who had been with the Voortrekkers who settled in the area.

== Modern history ==
=== Apartheid era ===
In South Africa, the National Party came to power in 1948 and enacted a series of segregation laws known as apartheid, meaning "separateness". The apartheid laws allowed for sporadic persecution of opposition leaders and enforced general segregation by classifying all South African inhabitants into racial groups. Non-White political participation was outlawed, and the entire public sphere, including education, residential areas, medical care, and common areas such as public transport, beaches, and amenities, were segregated.

Apartheid was officially abolished in 1991 after decades of widespread unrest by opponents who were seeking equal rights, led by supporters of the United Democratic Front, Pan-African Congress, South African Communist Party, and African National Congress, and a long international embargo against South Africa. The effective end to apartheid, however, is widely regarded as the 1994 general election, the first fully-democratic multi-racial election.

It took place following a long series of negotiations involving the National Party government under President Frederik Willem de Klerk (FW de Klerk), the ANC under Nelson Mandela, and other parties. The African National Congress won and Mandela was elected as president.

=== Post-apartheid era ===
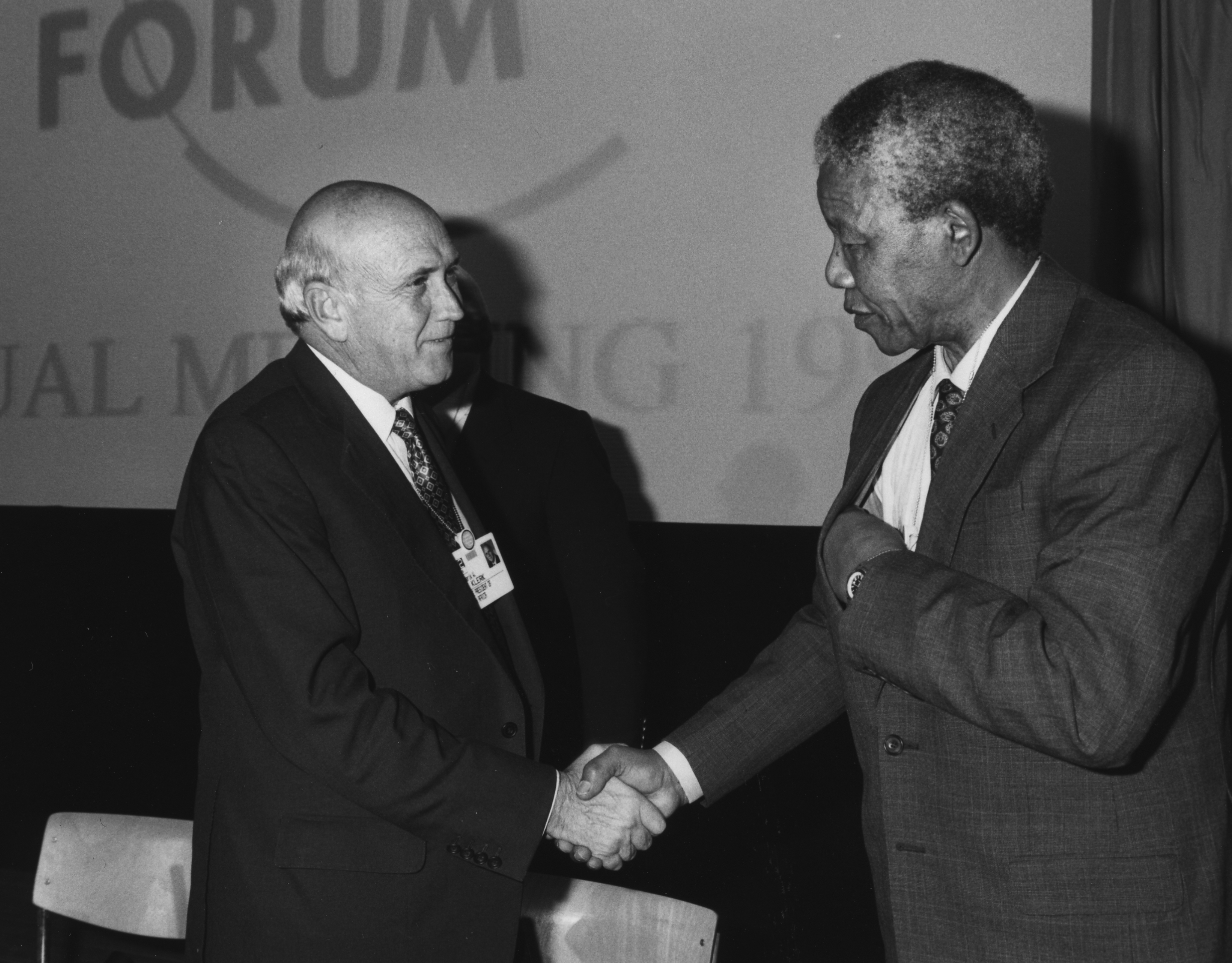
de Klerk and Mandela shake hands in January 1992

Following South Africa's transition to democracy in 1994, Afrikaners underwent a period of major social, political and economic change and faced a struggle for a new identity in the post-apartheid era. Many Afrikaners continued to do well economically, but some Afrikaners, specifically those from working class background increasingly experience financial hardship, this reflective of the broader unemployment crisis in South Africa. Estimates from 2006 indicated that some 350,000 Afrikaners were classified as poor, with some research claiming that up to 150,000 were struggling to survive.

Public debate regarding the status and perceived marginalisation of Afrikaners has remained a prominent feature in post-apartheid South African politics. Key areas of contention include transformation policies, land reform policies and controversial statements by political leaders that some groups have characterised as hate speech.

For example in March 2010, at a rally at the University of Johannesburg, South African politician Julius Malema sang parts of "Dubul' ibhunu", an anti-apartheid song whose lyrics mean "Shoot the Boer" in Nguni languages. The song has a long history of being sung by people of all races as part of the struggle against Apartheid; according to historians, “ibhunu” is a metaphor for the oppressor. Right-leaning commentators, however, interpret it as calling for anti-white violence. These interpretations are usually accompanied by claims that connecting it to farm attacks in South Africa and assertions that such attacks target white South Africans. However, White South Africans are exposed less to violent crimes than black South Africans and the majority of victims of farm attacks are black. As of the 1996 census, 68,606 out of the 749,637 people in the agriculture and hunting sector were white. Farm attacks represent a small fraction (less than 1%) of South Africa's total annual murders, which exceeded 27,000 in the 2022/23 period. According to data from the Transvaal Agricultural Union of South Africa (TLU SA), a group that tracks farm violence, approximately 1,363 white farmers and 529 of their relatives were murdered in South Africa between 1990 and 2024.

The alleged persecution of Afrikaners has in particular gained the attention of the United States, where President Donald Trump has insisted on numerous occasions that "there is a "white genocide" taking place against Afrikaners. The South African government and various critics have refuted his claims, stating "President Ramaphosa rejects white genocide claims. The Afrikaner advocacy organisation AfriForum has also been accused of claiming that a "white genocide" is taking place in South Africa and advancing the white genocide conspiracy theory. The group however has denied these claims and stated that "we have never said there is a white genocide in South Africa", political party, Freedom Front Plus has defended the group also refuting allegation that the group had spread false information.

== Geography ==
Afrikaners originated in the Dutch Cape Colony (after 1806, the British Cape Colony), and thus their present-day numbers are concentrated in South Africa. Afrikaners also have a significant presence in Namibia due to the country's long political administration and de facto incorporation into South Africa between 1915 and 1990.

An Afrikaner diaspora has developed since the end of the South African white minority government in 1994. Emigrants have settled predominantly in English-speaking countries, with their largest concentrations in Australia and New Zealand.

=== South Africa ===
The South African National Census of 2011 shows the greatest geographic concentration of Afrikaners is in the City of Tshwane, with over 453,000 white Afrikaans-speakers there overall. Afrikaners are particularly prevalent in Pretoria and Centurion. At the time of the census, over 331,000 residents of Pretoria spoke Afrikaans as their first language and the city was majority (52%) white. In nearby Centurion (formerly Verwoerdburg), also majority white (59%), 115,000 residents spoke Afrikaans as their first language. The importance of this region to post-apartheid Afrikaner society can be seen in the building of campuses for two new Afrikaans-medium institutions of higher education in the vicinity, Sol-Tech in 2020 (Pretoria) and Akademia in 2021 (Centurion). The importance of the City of Tshwane can also be gleaned from the numbers of high schools in the area. In 2022, 20 Afrikaans-medium secondary schools and another 6 dual- or parallel-medium (Afrikaans and English) secondary schools existed in Pretoria and Centurion graduating 4,515 students.

Significant concentrations of Afrikaners also exist in the East Rand/City of Ekurhuleni, Cape Town (especially the northern suburbs around Bellville and Strand in the Helderberg), the West Rand, Port Elizabeth, Bloemfontein and the Vaal Triangle.

=== Namibia ===
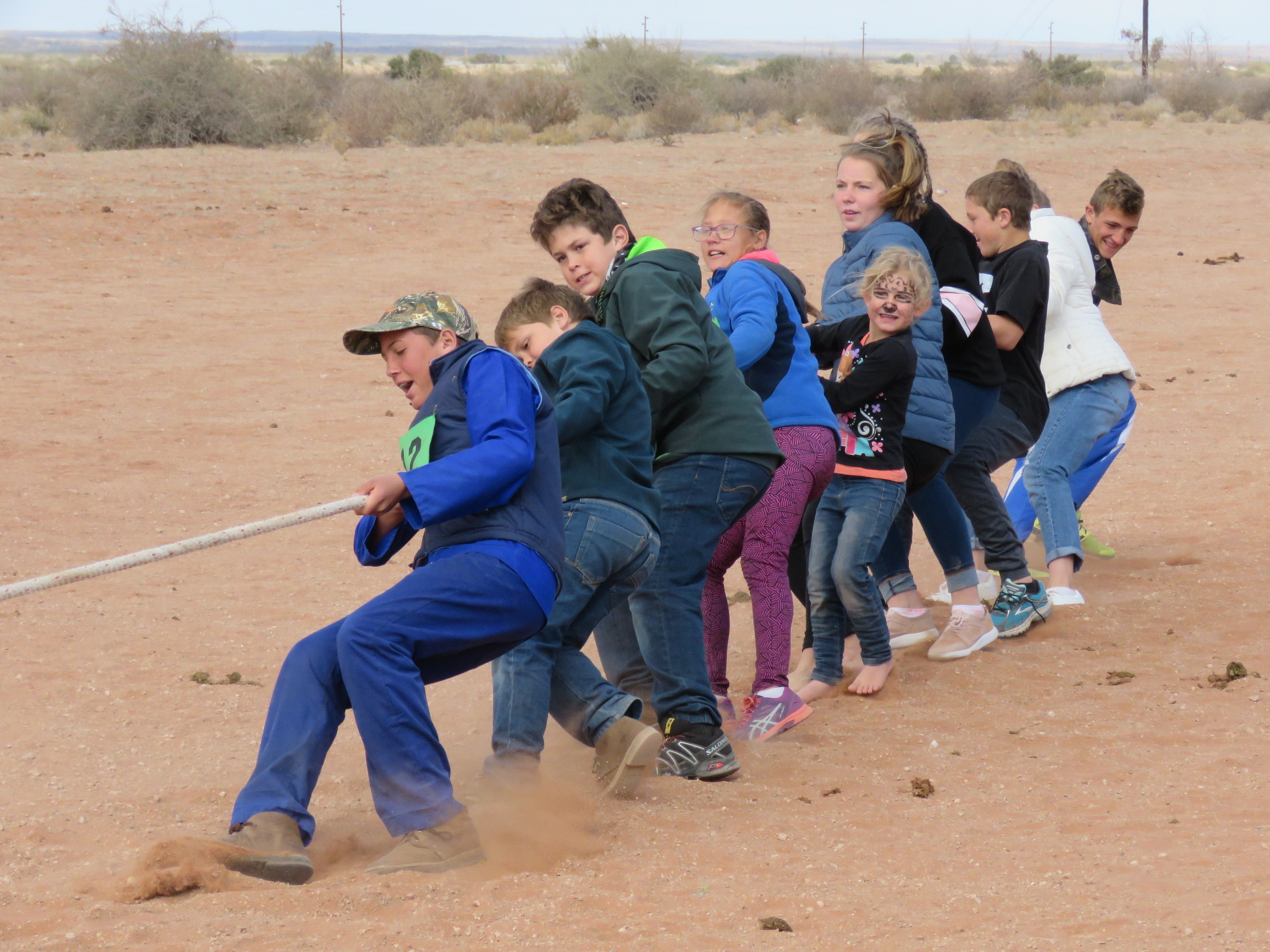
Afrikaner children in Namibia playing tug of war

The chief site of Afrikaner settlement in Namibia is the country's capital city, Windhoek. Afrikaners are concentrated in the sections of the city east of the Western Bypass road, areas historically reserved for whites prior to the end of legal residential apartheid in 1977. In the 2011 Namibian Census, 29,717 residents spoke Afrikaans in the constituencies of Windhoek East and Windhoek West combined, both located for the most part east of the Western Bypass. This is a fair estimate of the size of the Afrikaner resident population in the city at that time.

Smaller concentrations of Afrikaners exist in the coastal Namibian cities of Swakopmund and Walvis Bay, the latter an exclave of South Africa until 1994.

=== Botswana ===
Botswana has a small group of Afrikaners historically concentrated in the Ghanzi area, as well more recent arrivals as in the Kgalagadi District along the country's southwest border with South Africa. Afrikaners have lived in the Ghanzi area since 1898 when the British South Africa Company offered land to settlers who moved to the region. According to the 2001 Botswana Census, 6,750 residents of the country spoke Afrikaans at home making up 0.4% of the total population. As some unknown number of those counted were Coloured, the number of Afrikaners in Botswana is some degree less than the stated census figure.

=== Afrikaner diaspora ===
White South Africans began emigrating in significant numbers in the mid-1970s in the wake of the Soweto uprising and again in the mid-1980s after the 1985 declaration of the state of emergency and the intensification of the South African Border War. These early waves were overwhelmingly Anglo in character, however. Not until the early 1990s, during the transition period out of apartheid and white minority rule, did Afrikaners begin leaving the country. Statistics South Africa estimated a net 304,112 white residents left the country over the years 1986–2000 with another 341,000 over the period 2001–2016. This emigration is the source of a notable Afrikaner diaspora today.

==== Australia and New Zealand ====
Outside South Africa and Namibia, the largest population of Afrikaners resides in Australia and New Zealand. According to the 2021 Australian census, 49,375 residents spoke Afrikaans at home. While not all of those are Afrikaners, they are likely the overwhelming majority. In 2023, 49,041 residents of New Zealand spoke Afrikaans.

The largest geographic concentration of Afrikaners outside Africa is likely Auckland, New Zealand. In 2023, 1.2% of all Auckland region residents spoke Afrikaans, or roughly 19,599 people. The North Shore is a site of notable Afrikaner settlement, especially Browns Bay and the surrounding suburbs. East Auckland is a secondary site, especially Howick.

A second major overseas concentration is Greater Perth, Australia. In 2021, 0.6% of the population of Western Australia's capital and its environs, or 11,870 persons, spoke Afrikaans. The city's northwest suburbs, particularly the City of Wanneroo and City of Joondalup, have the highest concentrations of Afrikaans-speakers. The South African, and especially Afrikaans-speaking, community is so large there that South Africans have nicknamed the city "Perthfontein" and "Bloemfontein by the sea".

==== North America ====
===== Canada =====
According to the 2021 Canadian Census, 14,665 residents of Canada spoke Afrikaans. The largest concentration was in the Vancouver metropolitan area at 1,860 persons.

===== United States =====
Over the period 2009–13, the American Community Survey recorded 23,010 Afrikaans-speakers age 5 and over in the United States. The Atlanta metropolitan area had the highest concentration with 1,900 speakers.

On 7 February 2025, US President Donald Trump signed an executive order, addressing South Africa's Expropriation Act 13 of 2024, which allowed land seizures targeting Afrikaner farmers. In addition, the US would be halting aid to South Africa and prioritising refugee resettlement for Afrikaners facing discrimination. A month later, the US State Department reported receiving approximately 8,000 inquiries from Afrikaners, seeking refugee resettlement. In addition, the Trump administration indicated that up to 1,000 Afrikaners could be admitted to the United States within the year. Two months later, on 12 May, nearly 60 Afrikaner refugees arrived at Dulles International Airport under a new US policy prioritising their resettlement. In the meantime, the Episcopal Church ended its refugee resettlement partnership with the US government, claiming their policy is racially biased and inconsistent with their values of justice and equity.

Between October 2025 and August 2026, US admitted 10,258 refugees, nearly all from South Africa.

==== The United Kingdom ====
While the United Kingdom is the leading destination for white South African emigrants, very few Afrikaners move to the country. In England and Wales in 2021, over 217,000 residents were born in South Africa but only 7,489 spoke Afrikaans as their main language.

==== Netherlands ====
The Netherlands, due to persistent skilled labour shortages in the 2020s, is increasingly recruiting Afrikaners. Their distance to the Dutch labour market is significantly lessened due to the partial mutual intelligibility of Afrikaans and Dutch as well as the rapid pace at which Afrikaners can typically learn Dutch.

==== Other ====
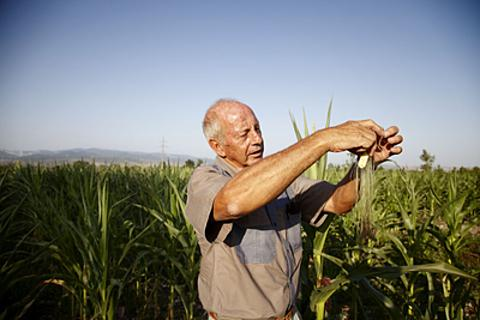
Afrikaner farmer in Georgia, Caucasus region, 2011

Since the early 1990s, the country of Georgia has attracted a small number of Afrikaner farmers to help revive its agricultural sector.

As of 2018 Russia has begun attempts of attracting Afrikaner farmers to deal with declining population.

== Culture ==
=== Religion ===
At the time of settlement, Dutch traders and others came out of a majority- Protestant area, where the Reformation had resulted in high rates of literacy in the Netherlands. Boers in South Africa were part of the Calvinist tradition in the northern Europe Protestant countries. The original South African Boer republics were founded on the principles of the Dutch Reformed Church. Missionaries established new congregations on the frontier and churches were the center of communities.

In 1985, 92% of Afrikaners identified as members of the Reformed churches that developed from this background. Pentecostal churches have also attracted new members.

=== Language ===
Alaric speaking Afrikaans.

Rossouw speaking Afrikaans.

The Afrikaans language changed over time from the Dutch spoken by the first white settlers at the Cape. From the late 17th century, the form of Dutch spoken at the Cape developed differences, mostly in morphology but also in pronunciation and accent and, to a lesser extent, in syntax and vocabulary, from that of the Netherlands, although the languages are still similar enough to be mutually intelligible. Settlers who arrived speaking German and French soon shifted to using Dutch and later Afrikaans. The process of language change was influenced by the languages spoken by slaves, Khoikhoi, and people of mixed descent, as well as by Cape Malay, Zulu, British and Portuguese. While the Dutch of the Netherlands remained the official language, the new dialect, often known as Cape Dutch, African Dutch, kitchen Dutch, or taal (meaning "language" in Afrikaans) developed into a separate language by the 19th century, with much work done by the Genootskap van Regte Afrikaners and writers such as Cornelis Jacobus Langenhoven. In a 1925 act of Parliament, Afrikaans was given equal status with Dutch as one of the two official languages (English being the second) of the Union of South Africa. There was much objection to the attempt to legislate the creation of Afrikaans as a new language. Marthinus Steyn, a prominent jurist and politician, and others were vocal in their opposition. Today, Afrikaans is recognised as one of the eleven official languages of South Africa, and is the third most common first language in South Africa.

Afrikaans is offered at many universities outside of South Africa including in the Netherlands, Belgium, Germany, Poland, Russia and the United States.

=== Literature ===
Afrikaners have a long literary tradition, and have produced a number of notable novelists and poets, including Eugene Marais, Uys Krige, Elisabeth Eybers, Breyten Breytenbach, André Brink, C. J. Langenhoven and Etienne Leroux.

Nobel Prize winner J. M. Coetzee is of Afrikaner descent, although he spoke English at home as a child in Cape Town. He has translated some works from Afrikaans and Dutch into English, but writes only in English.

=== Arts ===
Music is a popular art form among Afrikaners. While the traditional Boeremusiek ("Boer music") and Volkspele ('folk dancing', lit. 'people games') enjoyed popularity in the past, most Afrikaners today favour a variety of international genres and light popular Afrikaans music. American country and western music has enjoyed great popularity and has a strong following among many South Africans. Some also enjoy a social dance event called a sokkie. The South African rock band Seether has a hidden track on their album Karma and Effect titled Kom Saam Met My ("Come With Me"), sung in Afrikaans. There is also an underground rock music movement and bands like the controversial Fokofpolisiekar ('Fuck-off-police-car') have a large following. The television Channel MK (channel) also supports local Afrikaans music and mainly screens videos from the Afrikaans Rock genre. Afrikaner classical musicians include the pianists Wessel van Wyk, Ben Schoeman, and Petronel Malan, and the music departments of the various universities (Pretoria, Stellenbosch, Potchefstroom, Free State) that started as Afrikaans universities still are renowned. In the 20th century, Mimi Coertse was an internationally renowned opera singer. She is also known as African Lieder interpreter by Stephanus Le Roux Marais. The world-renowned UNISA music exams include a section of South African contemporary music, which acknowledges Afrikaner composers. The contemporary musical Ons vir jou ('Us for you'), dealing with the Second Boer War, featured a book by Deon Opperman and a score by Sean Else and Johan Vorster of the band Eden. Afrikaner film musicals flourished in the 1950s and 1960s, and have returned in the 21st century with two popular films, Liefling and Pretville, featuring singers such as Bobby van Jaarsveld, Steve Hofmeyr, and Kevin Leo.

=== Cuisine ===
Afrikaner cuisine has contributed three unique terms to the South African lexicon, namely boerekos ('farmer/Boer food'), potjiekos ('small pot food') and braaivleis ('grilled meat'; frequently just braai, 'grilled'), although the latter (meaning "grilled meat") has actually expanded to a common South African habit.

A typical recipe for boerekos consists of meat (usually roasted in a pan or oven), vegetables such as green beans, roots or peas, and starch such as potatoes or rice, with sauce made in the pot in which the meat is cooked. The dish can also use pumpkins or sweet potatoes, and some of the ingredients may be further processed into pampoenkoekies ('pumpkin biscuits', pumpkin baked in a kind of puff) or plaasboontjies ("Farm beans") consisting of green beans cooked and crushed with potatoes and onions. Afrikaners eat most types of meat such as mutton, beef, chicken, pork and various game species, but the meat of draft animals such as horses and donkeys is rarely eaten and is not part of traditional cuisine.

East Indian influence emerges in dishes such as bobotie and curry, and the use of turmeric and other spices in cooking. Afrikaner households often eat combinations such as pap-and-sausage, meat curry and rice, and even fish and chips (although the latter are bought rather than self-prepared). Other traditional Afrikaner dishes include biltong, droëwors, koeksisters, melktert, and a variety of traditionally homemade but increasingly storebought pastries.

=== Sport ===
Rugby, cricket, golf and shot-put are the most popular sports among Afrikaners. Rugby in particular is considered one of the central pillars of the Afrikaner community. The national rugby team, the Springboks, did not compete in the first two rugby world cups in 1987 and 1991 because of anti-apartheid sporting boycotts of South Africa, but later on the Springboks won the 1995, 2007, 2019 and 2023 Rugby World Cups.

Boeresport ('farmer/Boer sport') also played a big role in the Afrikaner history. It consisted of a variety of sports like tug of war, three-legged races, jukskei, skilpadloop ('tortoise walk') and other games.

=== Numismatics ===
The world's first ounce-denominated gold coin, the Krugerrand, was struck at the South African Mint on 3 July 1967. The name Krugerrand was derived from Kruger (after president Paul Kruger) and the rand monetary unit of South Africa.

In April 2007, the South African Mint coined a collectors R1 gold coin commemorating the Afrikaner people as part of its cultural series, depicting the Great Trek across the Drakensberg mountains.

== Institutions ==
=== Cultural ===
The Afrikaanse Taal en Kultuurvereniging ("Afrikaans Language and Culture Association"), referred to by its initials, ATKV, promotes Afrikaans language and culture.

Voortrekkers is a youth movement for Afrikaners in South Africa and Namibia with a membership of over 10,000 active members to promote cultural values, maintaining norms and standards as Christians, and being accountable members of public society.

=== Political ===
The vast majority of Afrikaners supported the Democratic Alliance (DA), the official opposition party, in the 2014 general election. The DA is a liberal party and a full member of Liberal International.

Smaller numbers are involved in nationalist or separatist political organisations. The Freedom Front Plus (FF+) is an Afrikaner ethnic political party which lobbies for minority rights to be extended to Afrikaners. The FF+ is also leading the Volkstaat initiative and is closely associated with the small town of Orania. Then-Freedom Front Plus leader Pieter Mulder served as Deputy Minister of Agriculture, Forestry and Fisheries in the Cabinet of President Jacob Zuma from 2009 to 2014.

Very few Afrikaners vote for the ruling ANC. Some prominent Afrikaner ANC politicians include Derek Hanekom, Marthinus van Schalkwyk, Andries Nel, Gert Oosthuizen and Carl Niehaus.

In an online poll of the Beeld newspaper during November 2012, in which nearly 11,000 Afrikaners participated, 42% described themselves as conservative and 36% as liberal.

In the 2019 general elections, the FF+'s support surged in former strongholds of the DA. Senior FF+ member Philip van Staden said that his party had grown significantly in the election due to the DA leader Mmusi Maimane's positions on race and ethnic identity resulting in the estrangement of many Afrikaans-speaking white voters. The party has since gone on to win previous DA wards with concentrated Afrikaner populations.

== See also ==
- Afrikaners in Zimbabwe
- Afrikaner Calvinism
- Afrikaner nationalism
- Afrikaner-Jews
- Afrikaans-speaking population of South Africa
- Boer
- Cape Dutch
- Huguenots in South Africa
- Afrikaner Argentines
