= Onverwacht, Gauteng =

Onverwacht
- Location within Gauteng Location within South Africa
- Coordinates: 25.604°S 28.600°E
- Country: South Africa
- Province: Gauteng
- Municipality: City of Tshwane

Area
  - Total: 1.24 km^{2} (0.48 sq mi)

Population (2011)
  - Total: 1,518
  - Density: 1,220/km^{2} (3,170/sq mi)

Racial makeup (2011)
  - Black African: 78.3%
  - Coloured: 19.8%
  - Indian/Asian: 0.4%
  - Other: 1.5%

First languages (2011)
  - Afrikaans: 29.8%
  - Northern Sotho: 29.3%
  - Sotho: 14.2%
  - S. Ndebele: 11.0%
  - Other: 15.7%
- Time zone: UTC+2 (SAST)
- Postal code (street): 0557
- PO box: 0557

Onverwacht (Dutch for "unexpected") is a town in City of Tshwane Metropolitan Municipality in the Gauteng province of South Africa. The settlement is located about 40 km north-east of Pretoria, near the mining town of Cullinan.

== History ==
Onverwacht was established in 1886 by President Paul Kruger. During the Second Boer War, local blacks were promised their own land if they helped the Boers in the war, and the promise was kept despite the Boer defeat. The village was also the site of the Battle of Onverwacht, which took place on 4 January 1902.

== Present day ==
Today, Onverwacht is home to approximately 100 black Afrikaner families. The local inhabitants have petitioned the government to have their town declared a heritage site.
