= Bobotie =

Meat dish

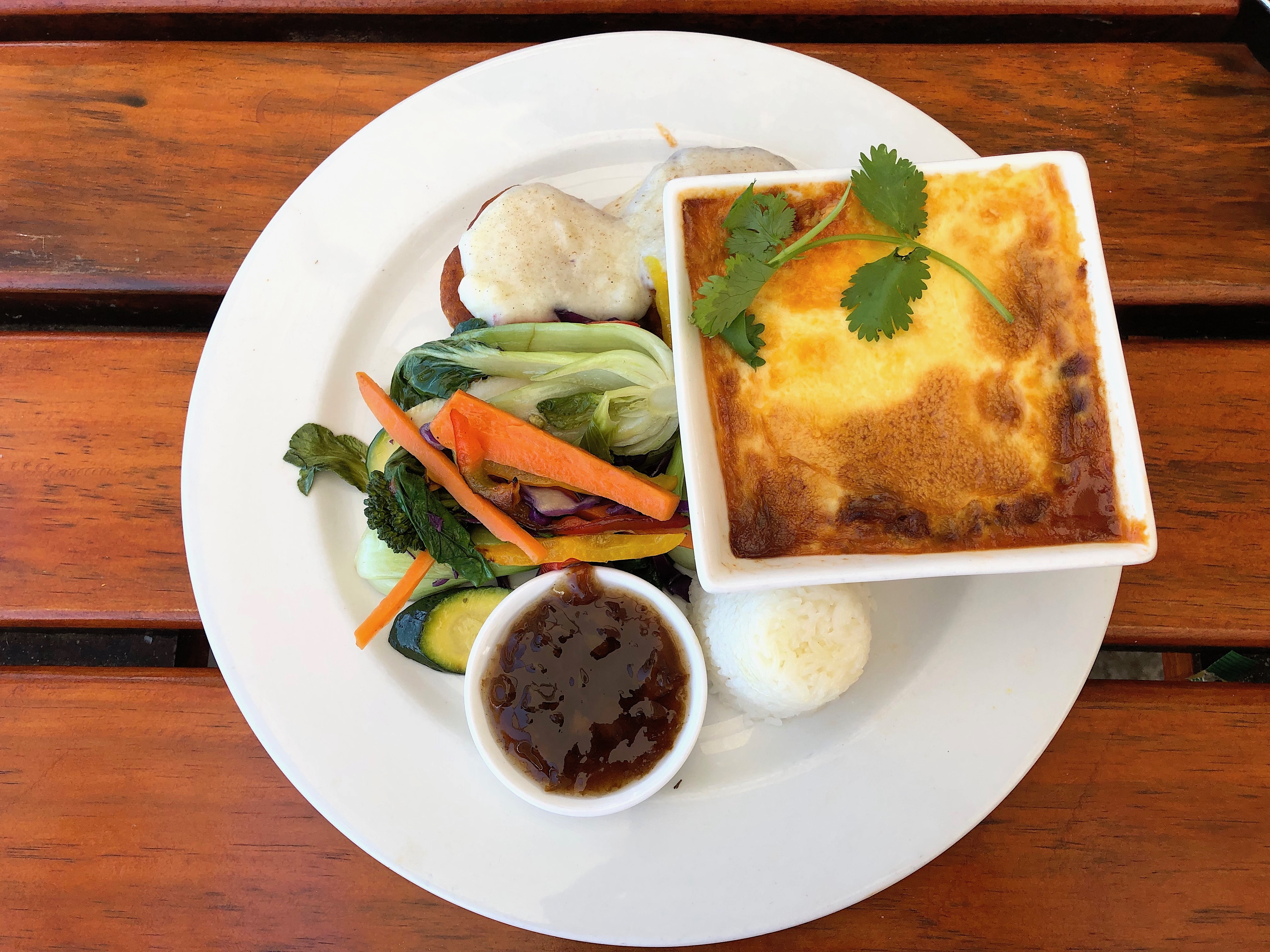
- Bobotie with salad and chutney
- Place of origin: South Africa
- Main ingredients: Minced meat

Bobotie (Afrikaans pronunciation: [bəˈbuəti]) is a South African dish consisting of spiced minced meat baked with an egg-based topping. It is not however a national dish.

== Origin of name and recipe ==
Bobotie appears to be a variant of patinam ex lacte, a dish documented by the ancient Roman writer Apicius consisting of layers of cooked meat, pine nuts, and seasoned with pepper, celery seeds and asafoetida. These were cooked until the flavours had blended, when a top layer of egg and milk was added. When the latter had set, the dish was ready to be served. C. Louis Leipoldt, a South African writer and gourmet, wrote that the recipe was known in Europe in the seventeenth century.

The origin of the word bobotie is contentious. The Afrikaans etymological dictionary claims that the probable origin is the Malayan word boemboe, meaning curry spices. Others think it to have originated from bobotok, an Indonesian dish which consisted of totally different ingredients. The first recipe for bobotie appeared in a Dutch cookbook in 1609. Afterwards, it was taken to South Africa and adopted by the Cape Malay community. It is also made with curry powder, leaving it with a slight "tang". It is often served with sambal. The dish has been known in the Cape of Good Hope since the 17th century, when it was made with a mixture of mutton and pork.

== Preparation ==
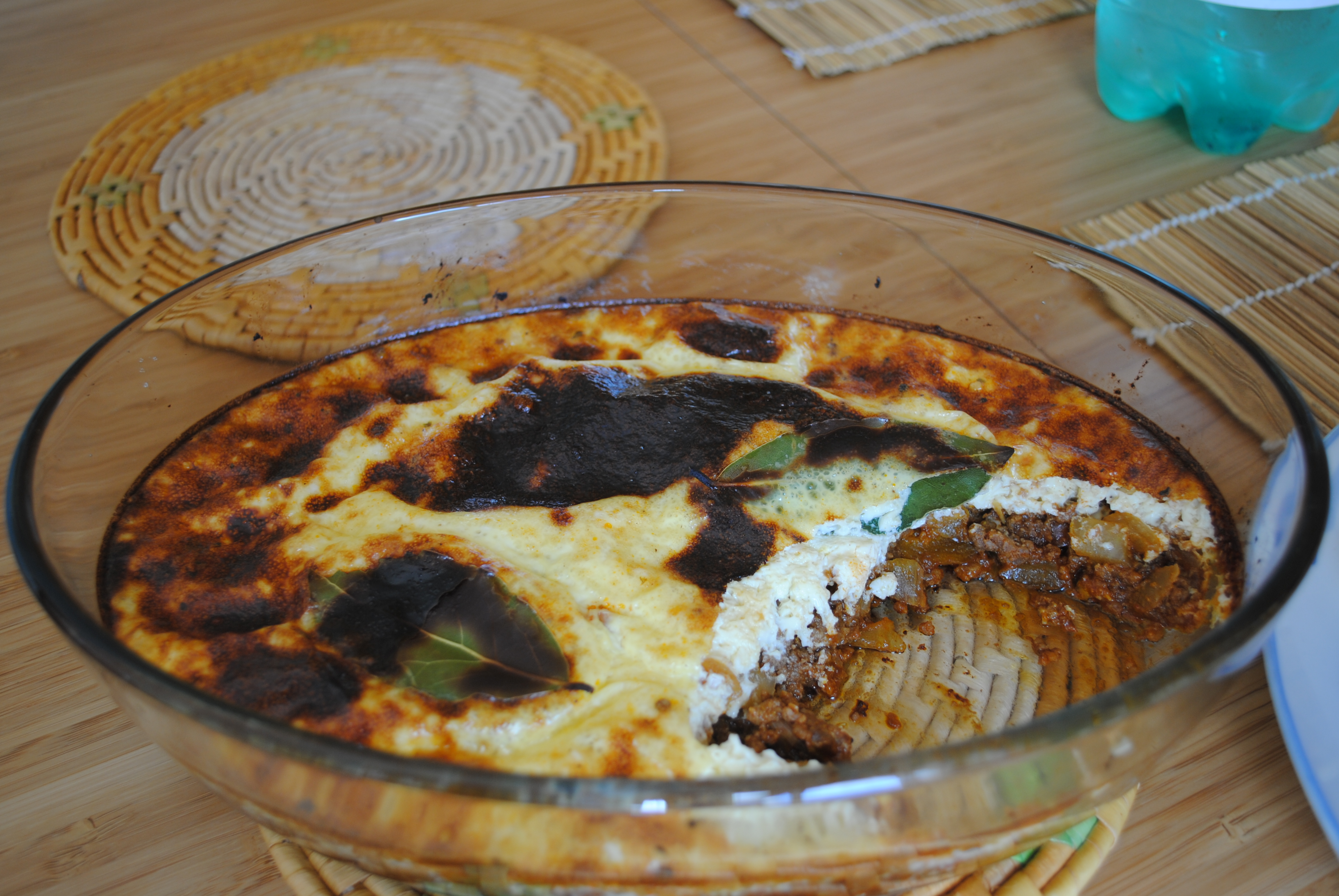
Bobotie, ready in a baking dish

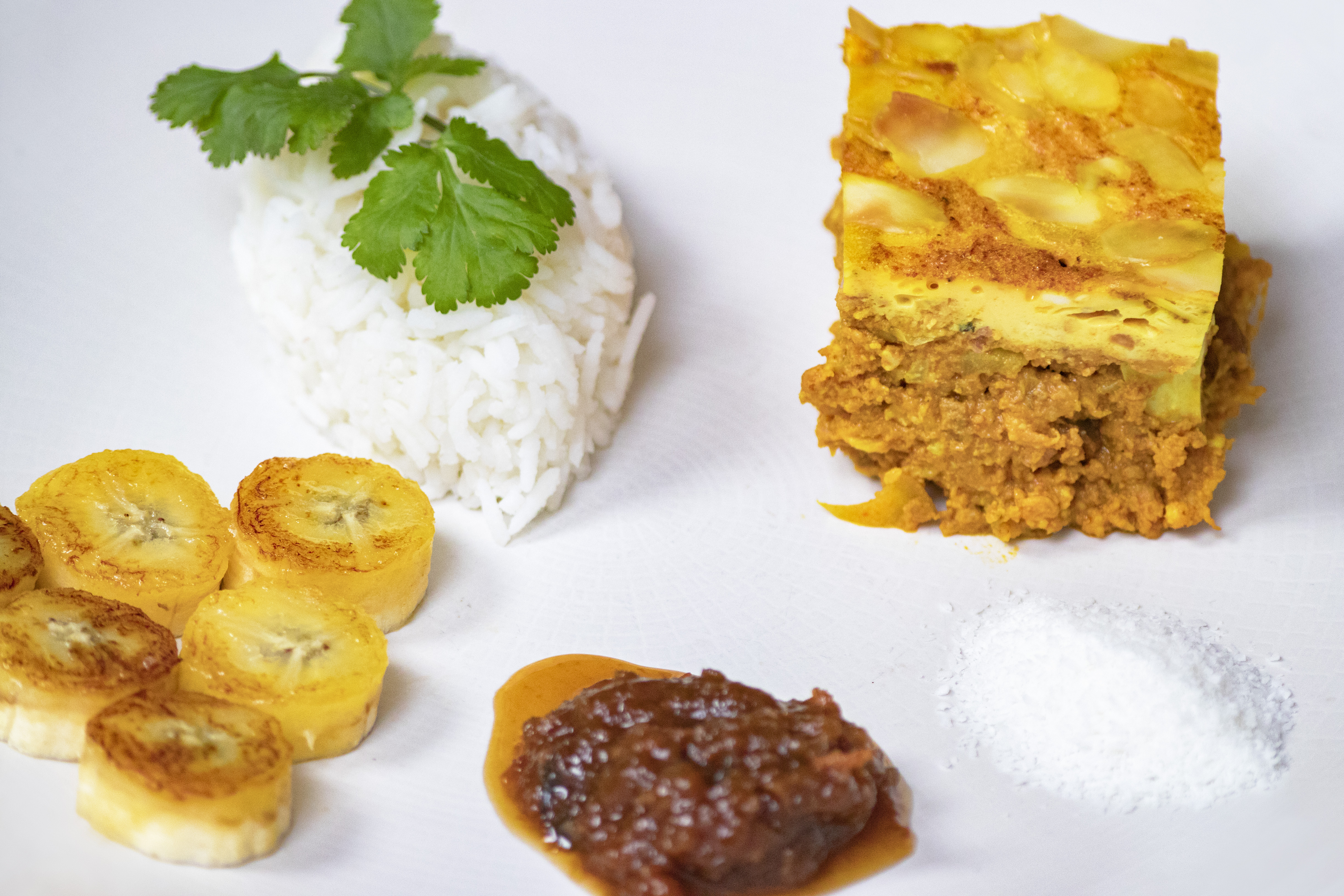
Bobotie, with egg and milk-soaked bread mixture, colored with turmeric. Almonds for topping, banana, chutney, coconut and rice on side.

Today, bobotie is much more likely to be made with beef or lamb, although pork can also be used. Early recipes incorporated ginger, marjoram and lemon rind; the introduction of curry powder has simplified the recipe but the basic concept remains the same. Some recipes also call for chopped onions and almonds to be added to the mixture. Traditionally, bobotie incorporates dried fruit like raisins or sultanas. It is often garnished with bay leaves, walnuts, chutney and bananas. Although not particularly spicy, the dish incorporates a variety of flavours that can add complexity. For example, the dried fruit (usually apricots and raisins or sultanas) contrasts the curry flavouring. The texture of the dish is also complex, the baked egg mixture topping complementing the milk-soaked bread which adds moisture to the dish. Bobotie is usually served with "yellow rice", which is rice cooked with turmeric.

=== Leipoldt's recipe ===
Leipoldt's recipe book published in 1933 calls for finely minced meat, breadcrumbs, milk, onions and butter and a curry sauce made with spices, sugar, lemon juice, chilli pepper and vinegar. This is baked with a topping of egg and milk.

=== Tulleken's recipe ===
A 1923 recipe by Mrs S. van H. Tulleken uses mutton, almonds, bitter almond essence, onions, butter, bread, curry powder, lemon juice, eggs and sugar, baked with a custard topping of eggs and milk.

== Bobotie elsewhere in Africa ==
Bobotie recipes were transported by South African settlers to other parts of Africa. Today, recipes for it can be found that originated in Afrikaner-descended settler communities in Botswana, Kenya, Zambia and Zimbabwe. There is a variation that was popular among the 7,000 Boer settlers who settled in the Chubut River Valley in Argentina in the early 20th century, in which the bobotie mixture is packed inside a large pumpkin, which is then baked until tender.

== In culture ==
=== 2008 Augusta National Champions Dinner ===
Bobotie was selected by 2008 Masters golf champion and South African native Trevor Immelman as the featured menu item for Augusta National's annual "Champions Dinner" in April 2009. Each year, the reigning champion at The Masters golf tournament, played every year in Augusta, Georgia, hosts the gathering and tends to create a menu featuring specialties from his home region.

=== 2014 Epcot International Food and Wine Festival ===
South African bobotie was one of the featured items on the menu; it is also served with turkey and mushrooms. It is listed as gluten-free. It is also on the everyday menu at the buffet restaurant Boma at Disney's Animal Kingdom Lodge.

=== In Modern Times ===
Today, bobotie is more commonly made with ground beef and lamb, owing to the fact that South Africa has a significant Cape Malay Muslim community. Families have improvised more traditional recipes through the years, and each bobotie would probably taste a lot different when compared to each other.

== See also ==
- Cook and Enjoy It, a cookbook by S.J.A. de Villiers
- List of African dishes
- List of meat dishes
