= Cook and Enjoy It =

Cookbook representing South African cuisine

Cook and Enjoy It 1995 book cover

Cook and Enjoy It is the English version of the original Afrikaans cookbook, Kook en Geniet, which became known as the definitive cookbook representing authentic South African food culture and heritage. Kook en Geniet was originally published by S.J.A. (Ina) de Villiers in 1951 in her private capacity after South African publishers expressed indifference.

Cook and Enjoy It was published by the Central News Agency in 1961, and from 1972 onwards by Human & Rousseau when the Central News Agency withdrew from publishing.

In 1990 Human & Rousseau obtained the rights to the production and marketing of the Afrikaans edition, resulting in a completely revised edition in 1992 with a new appearance for both the Afrikaans and English versions. The new edition attempted to retain the character of the original book's more than 700 recipes and basic cooking principles, having incorporated the use of modern kitchen appliances such as microwaves and food processors in many recipes.

For the revised 1992 edition, some recipes were newly tested and rewritten in what was perceived to be an easy-to-follow style. Although a few recipes were edited and replaced, the intention was to retain the spirit and essence of the original.

In 2009 Human & Rousseau published a new, updated and revised edition of the book. Eunice van der Berg, a daughter of the author, was in charge of the whole process of revitalizing the book. This edition returned to a format more in line with the original edition, but also incorporated a modern approach and feel. Amongst the changes was a truncated title for the English edition: Cook and Enjoy.

Ina de Villiers died on 20 September 2010 at age 91.

In 2005 it was estimated that over half a million Afrikaans copies had been sold. At the time of the author's death, sales in both languages far exceeded a million copies.

== See also ==
- Bobotie
- Koeksister
- Melktert
- Tomato bredie
- Waterblommetjiebredie
