= George McCall Theal =

South African historian, archivist and genealogist

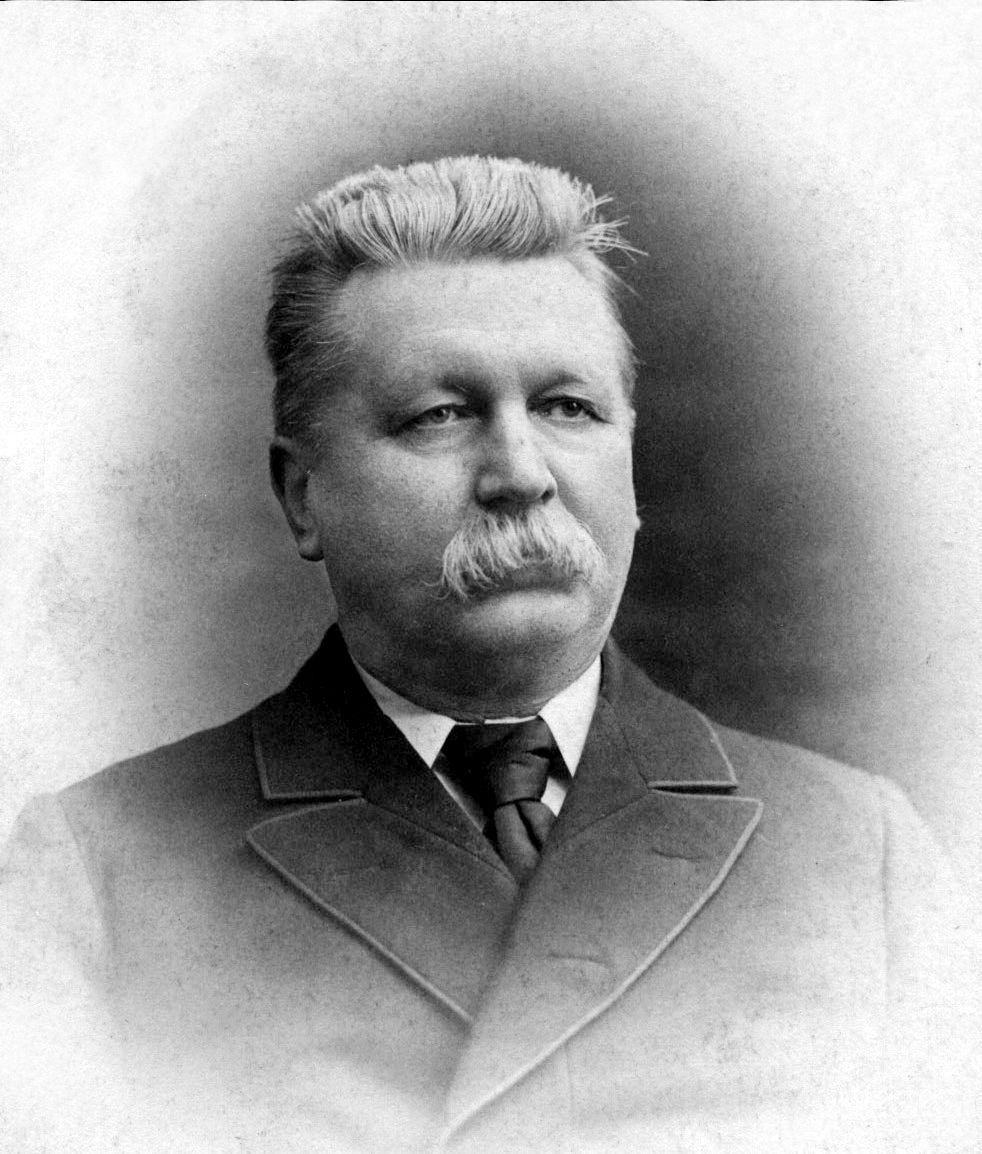
- Born: 11 April 1837; Saint John, New Brunswick
- Died: 17 April 1919 (aged 82); Wynberg, Cape Town
- Occupations: Historian, archivist and genealogist

George McCall Theal (11 April 1837, Saint John, New Brunswick – 17 April 1919, Wynberg, Cape Town), was the most prolific and influential South African historian, archivist and genealogist of the late nineteenth and early twentieth century.

== Life history ==
The son of Canadian physician William Young Theal, who wanted him to become an Episcopalian minister, Theal left home early, sailing with his uncle, Captain Francis Peabody Leavitt, (Note: see Thomas Leavitt (banker)) and lived briefly in the United States and Sierra Leone before emigrating to South Africa. There he became a teacher but soon moved to journalism, publishing, and an unsuccessful stint as an amateur diamond miner, all in South African frontier communities. His career as a historian began with the publication of his Compendium of South African History and Geography in 1873 following his return to teaching.

Theal spent five years at the Lovedale Seminary outside Alice in the Eastern Cape, working amongst missionaries and Africans. Lovedale was an important institution in the early 1870s, being a non-sectarian and non-denominational theological seminary and Christian school, founded by Presbyterian missionaries in 1841. Lovedale's principal, Dr. James Stewart, attached great importance to the teaching of printing and bookbinding. In 1872 Stewart needed someone who could teach and manage the printing works – Theal was the man. He had taught first at an elementary school in Knysna and from 1867 at a public school in King William's Town, later to become Dale College Boys' High School. He had also been editor of three minor British Kaffrarian newspapers between 1862 and 1865, and later worked for the Kaffrarian Watchman in King William's Town, where he printed his first contribution South Africa As It Is in 1871. From King William's Town he had travelled to Du Toit's Pan, then seen as the richest diamond mine in the world, and was present when Britain raised the Union Jack over the area. Theal wrote some articles for the Diamond News and called the takeover "a most disastrous change". Having failed to make his fortune on the diamond fields, he returned to the Eastern Cape. Theal was a religious man, and thus believed that it was the civilised white man's duty to rescue the black man from ignorance and barbarism (in common with others of that period, he saw it in racial terms as well). This made him ready to accept the Lovedale post.

While living in King William's Town, he read everything available on the history of South Africa and started on an outline of his own rendition which was a synthesis of all he had read. By 1875 at Lovedale he was teaching history, geography, English grammar and history of the Bible, and also being in charge of the printing department. He was responsible for the monthly publication of the Kaffir Express (later the Christian Express) and for the Xhosa version. The press published mainly religious and educational works. Between 1879 and 1882 Theal wrote a large number of articles for various periodicals on South African history. His knowledge of the Bantu was so extensive that in 1877 he was requested by Sir Bartle Frere to persuade some belligerent Bantu chiefs to moderate their attitude. Theal's success in this role led to his being offered a post in the Treasury. He accepted this position, aware that he would then have access to the State archives which were housed in the Surveyor-General's office.

== Publications ==
=== History of South Africa ===
Theal's history had a complicated evolution, absorbing precursor works dating back to the 1880s. This is the final configuration, although he continued to revise individual volumes up to his death. It is primarily a history of colonisation, and ends in 1884 when the last indigenous territories had been annexed by Europeans, and the London Convention temporarily stabilised relations between the Boers and the British. Theal's method was to build his narrative detail by detail from archival sources, and D. M. Schreuder suggests that he may have been prevented from taking his history beyond the 1880s by restrictions on access to more recent documents. All volumes are available from the Internet Archive.

- Before 1505 (one volume): Ethnography and Condition of South Africa before A.D. 1505 (Allen & Unwin, 1919). An earlier version appeared as The Yellow and Dark-Skinned People of Africa South of the Zambezi (Swan Sonnenschein, 1910).
- From 1505 to 1795 (three volumes): History and Ethnography of Africa South of the Zambesi, from the Settlement of the Portuguese at Sofala in September 1505 to the Conquest of the Cape Colony by the British in September 1795 (Swan Sonnenschein, 1907–1910, later reissued by Allen & Unwin).
- From 1795 to 1872 (five volumes): History of South Africa from 1795 to 1872 (Allen & Unwin, 1908).
- From 1873 to 1884 (two volumes): History of South Africa from 1873 to 1884, Twelve Eventful Years (Allen & Unwin, 1919).

=== Other works ===
- South Africa As It Is (pamphlet, 1871 King William's Town)
- Compendium of the History and Geography of South Africa. E. Stanford. 1878.
- Kaffir Folk-Lore: Selection from the Traditional Tales. Library of Alexandria. 1970. ISBN 978-1-4655-1735-7.
- Chronicles of Cape Commanders, Or an Abstract of Original Manuscripts in the Archives of the Cape Colony, Dating from 1651 to 1691 ... Richards. 1882.
- Basutoland Records (3 vols. 1883 Cape Town)
- Boers and Bantu: A History of the Wanderings and Wars of the Emigrant Farmers from Their Leaving the Cape Colony to the Overthrow of Dingan. Saul Solomon. 1886.
- A Fragment of Basuto History, 1854 to 1871. Cape Town. 1886.
- The Republic of Natal (1886)
- History of the Emigrant Boers in South Africa. Kessinger. 1887.
- History of South Africa, 1486–1872, five volumes (Swan Sonnenschein, 1888–1893)
- Geslacht-Register Der Oude Kaapsche Familien. [Edited by G.M. Theal.]. Kaapstad. 1893. with C.C. de Villiers
- The Portuguese in South Africa (1896)
- Belangrijke Historische Documenten (3 vols. 1896–1911, Cape Town)
- Large number of documentary publications (1897–1905, London)
- Records of the Cape Colony 1793–1831 Copied for the Cape Government, from the Manuscript Documents I. BiblioBazaar. August 2009. ISBN 978-1-113-46059-2. (36 vols.)
- Records of South-Eastern Africa (9 vols. 1898–1903)
- Willem Adriaan Van Der Stel, and Other Historical Sketches. Cape Town: T.M. Miller. 1913.
- Documents Relating to the Kaffir War of 1835: Arranged and Seen Through the Press. Published for the Government of the Union of South Africa. 1912.
- Catalogue of Books and Pamphlets relating to Africa south of the Zambesi in the Collection of George McCall Theal (1912)
- South Africa, in the Story of the Nations series (first edition, Unwin, 1894; eighth edition, Unwin, 1917 — the last overseen by Theal)

== See also ==
- Historiography of the British Empire#South Africa

== Notes ==
- Schreuder, D. M. (1986). "The Imperial Historian as 'Colonial Nationalist': George McCall Theal and the Making of South African History". Studies in British Imperial History. pp. 95–158. doi:10.1007/978-1-349-18244-2_4. ISBN 978-1-349-18246-6.
- Rosenthal, Eric (1966). South African Dictionary of National Biography. London: Warne.
