= Christoffel Coetzee de Villiers =

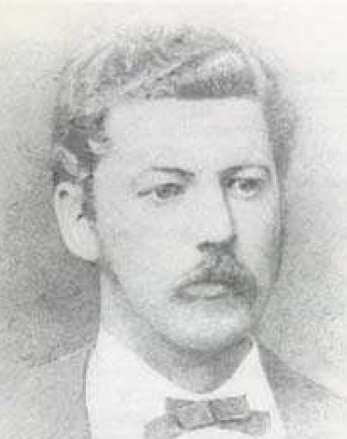
- Born: 10 March 1850; Swellendam, Cape Colony
- Died: 4 September 1887 (aged 37); Sea Point, Cape Town, Cape Colony
- Occupation: Printer
- Known for: Genealogist
- Notable work: Geslachts-Registers der Oude Kaapsche Familiën

Christoffel Coetzee de Villiers (10 March 1850 – 4 September 1887), born in Swellendam, Cape Colony as the fourth son of a wagon-maker, and married in Wellington where he then settled, spent his last years as a printer's clerk in Cape Town. His passion for researching his own family's history eventually grew into his compilation of Geslachts-Registers der Oude Kaapsche Familiën, a complete (in so far as it was possible) genealogy of colonists' descendants born at the Colony of the Cape of Good Hope during the Dutch period (1652–1806).

He died of pneumonia with his life's work uncompleted and leaving his family in penury, having expended all his resources on his research. On his death-bed, he extracted a promise from his friend and mentor, the historian George McCall Theal, to finish the work and have it published.

== Oude Kaapsche Familiën ==
The publication, financed by the Cape Government at Theal's insistence, had to wait until a few years after Theal's appointment (in 1891) as Colonial Historian. Only the first volume was sponsored, though: publication of the two others was conditional on sales of the first recovering its production cost. The public's reception was overwhelming and the three volumes are now collector's items. They set a standard of scholarship, aspired to but rarely equalled by later genealogists, and remain a standard reference work well over a century later.
