= Melktert =

South African tart

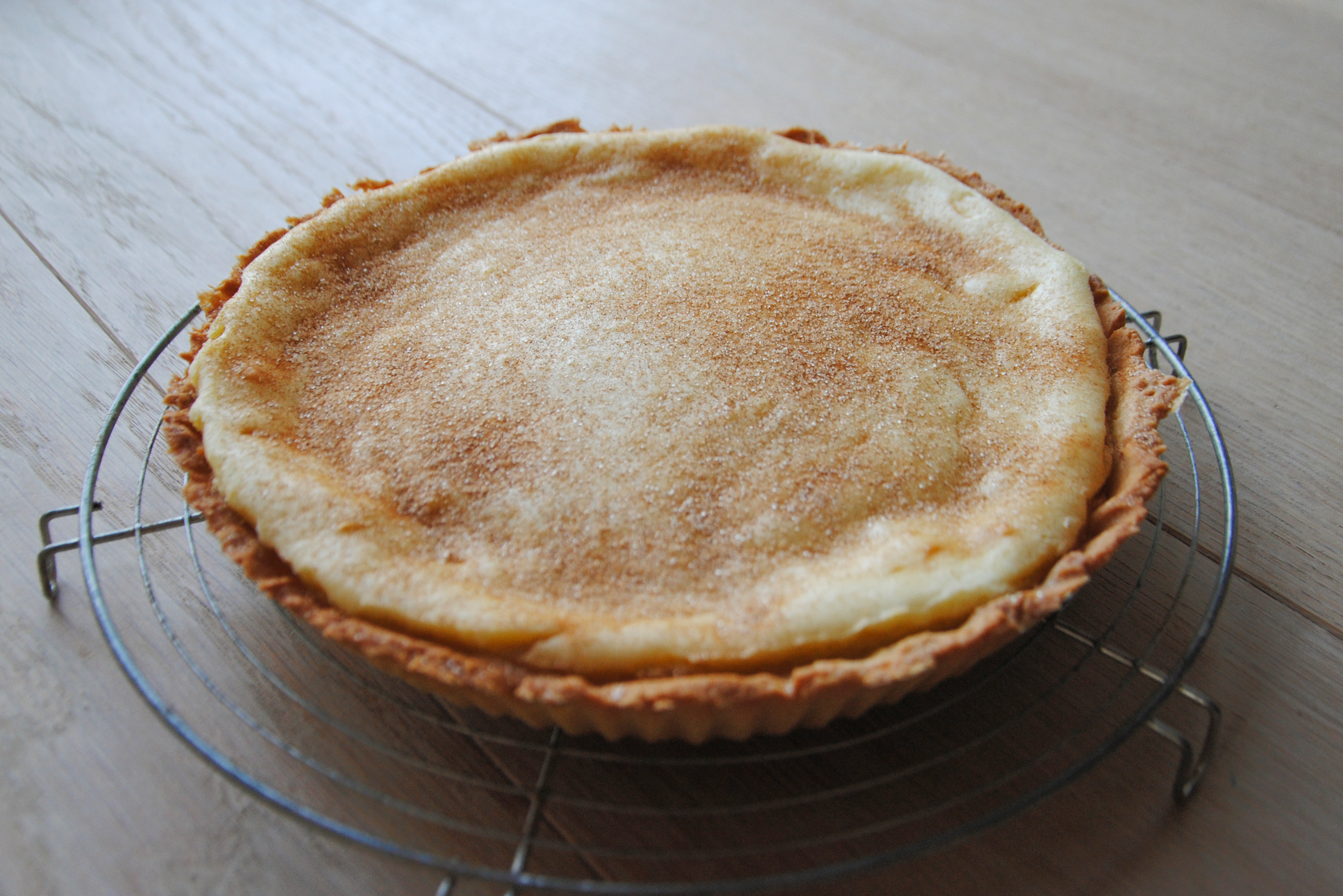
- A freshly baked melktert
- Type: Tart
- Course: Dessert
- Place of origin: South Africa
- Main ingredients: Pastry crust, milk, flour, sugar, eggs

Melktert, Afrikaans for "milk tart", is a South African dessert consisting of a sweet shortcrust pastry containing a creamy filling made from milk, flour, sugar and eggs. The ratio of milk to egg is higher than in a traditional Portuguese custard tart (pastel de nata) or Chinese egg tart (dan ta), in which both was influenced by the Portuguese, resulting in a lighter texture and a stronger milk flavour. Some recipes require the custard to be baked in the crust, and others call for the custard to be prepared in advance, and then placed in the crust before serving. Cinnamon is often sprinkled over its surface. The milk used for the custard can also be infused with a cinnamon stick before preparation.

== See also ==
- Cook and Enjoy It – South African cookbook
- List of African dishes
