= Volkspele =

External videos
- SOUTH AFRICAN FOLK DANCING, 1958. AP Archive - British Movietone News footage.

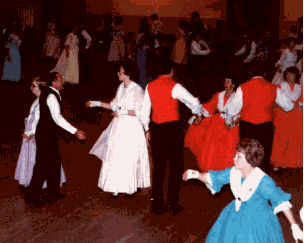
Folk dancers in traditional costume doing Volkspele at a saamtrek

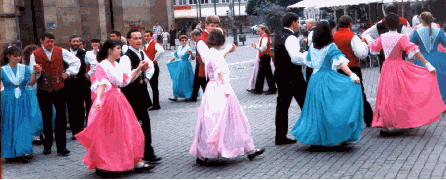
Folk dancers in traditional costume doing Volkspele while on tour in Europe

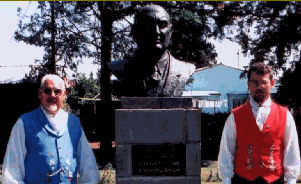
Two Volkspele participants, Willie van Vollenhoven and Dr. Anton van Vollenhoven with the bust of Dr. SH Pellisier in Boshof, South Africa

Volkspele is a South African folk dance tradition.

Directly translated, Volkspele means "folk-games" and can be translated to folk-dance. Folk-dance was the brain-child of South African Dr. SH Pellisier, whose exposure to Swedish folk-singing and folk-dancing came during a trip abroad in 1912.

Back in South Africa, Pellisier translated Swedish dances and introduced them at a Sunday School picnic in Boshof on 28 February 1914, when they were performed for the first time in South Africa. The picnic games became known as volkspele.

With the help of the Reddingsdaadbond, an organisation which was established to assist poor Afrikaners after the Anglo–Boer War, groups of dancers called laers were established throughout the country.

Get-togethers called saamtrekke are usually organised where all the laers get together to sing and do folk-dancing. The folk-dancers also present displays and have courses on different levels, seniors: people out of school, and juniors: learners in school, for either a weekend or longer. During the June school holidays there are also courses for grade 5-7 pupils (known as the Judith Pellissierweek - named after the wife of Dr Pellissier), grade 8-9 pupils (known as the Vormingsweek - Formative) and for grade 10-12 pupils (known as the Pellisierweek). From time to time there are overseas tours; or a folk-dance group or two will tour with South African folk-dancers in South Africa, giving displays at various towns. At these saamtrekke, displays, tours and courses the dress (volkspeledrag) is as the photos below show.

Tours have been conducted to Europe, Namibia, The United States and Turkey, with groups from Italy, Germany, Belgium and others touring South Africa.

The dress originated from the formal dress the pioneers or Voortrekkers wore. It is called national dress, as in the European countries. All folk-dancers in South Africa must use the same style with only the colours differing. Each laer has its own colours for the ladies' dresses as well as for the men's waistcoats - these are embroidered with indigenous flower designs.
