= Swallow (novel) =

1899 novel by H. Rider Haggard

Swallow: A Tale of the Great Trek
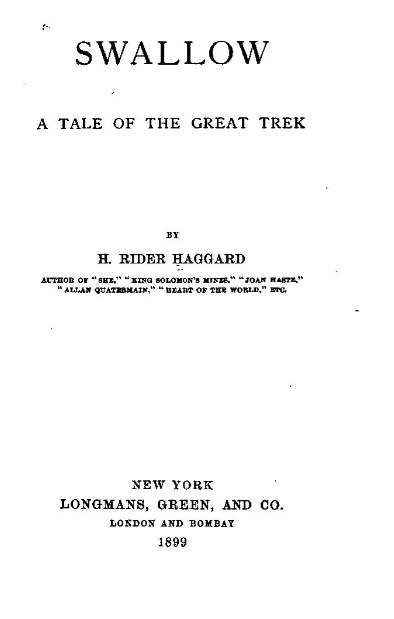
- Title page for Swallow: A Tale of the Great Trek (1899)
- Author: H. Rider Haggard
- Language: English
- Genre: Adventure novel
- Publication date: 1899
- Publication place: United Kingdom

Swallow: A Tale of the Great Trek is an 1899 novel by H. Rider Haggard, set in South Africa during the Boer Trek of 1836.

== Adaptation ==
The novel was adapted into a 1922 South African film.
