= Tolla van der Merwe =

South African stand-up comedian (born 1943)

- Born: Tertius Willem Jacobus van der Merwe; August 21, 1943; Clanwilliam, Western Cape, South Africa
- Died: August 7, 2000 (aged 56); Near Belfast, Mpumalanga, South Africa
- Spouse: Marita Bouwer (m. 1970)

Comedy career
- Years active: 1970s–2000
- Medium: Stand-up, actor, television presenter
- Genres: Observational comedy Satire; Physical comedy

Tertius Willem Jacobus "Tolla" van der Merwe (21 August 1943 – 7 August 2000) was a South African Afrikaans comedian, storyteller, actor and television personality, known for his warm humour and storytelling style. He was widely regarded as one of South Africa’s best-loved Afrikaans entertainers during the 1980s and 1990s.

== Early life ==
Tolla van der Merwe was born in Clanwilliam in the Western Cape, South Africa. He was the eldest of several siblings and attended Clanwilliam High School. After matric, he worked at the public library in Calvinia and later became a qualified motor mechanic, joining his family’s garage business.

He married Marita (also spelled Marieta) Bouwer in 1970, and the couple had four children.

== Career ==
Van der Merwe began his entertainment career performing humorous monologues and stories at community gatherings and festivals. His distinctive voice, timing and ability to portray colourful characters soon earned him national recognition.

He gained television fame on the popular programme Spies en Plessie, working alongside Jan Spies and P.G. du Plessis. Following Spies's death, van der Merwe hosted the series Maak ’n Las, collaborating with producers such as Nico Nel and Andries Krogman.

In addition to film and TV, van der Merwe released numerous spoken-word albums featuring his most popular stories and sketches, such as 36 Gewildste Stories and Se 120 Heel Beste Stories.

== Health ==
Earlier in 2000, van der Merwe underwent open-heart surgery, receiving five bypasses at Bayview Hospital in Mossel Bay. Despite the serious procedure, he was reported to have recovered well and returned to public appearances.

== Death ==
On 7 August 2000, van der Merwe died following a road accident on the N4 highway near Belfast, Mpumalanga. He was travelling with producer Ollie Viljoen, Viljoen’s wife Estelle, and storyteller Koos Meyer when their vehicle collided with a truck in heavy fog. Estelle Viljoen died at the scene, and van der Merwe succumbed to his injuries later in hospital.

His funeral took place in Clanwilliam on 11 August 2000 and was attended by hundreds of admirers, friends and colleagues.

== Style and public image ==
Van der Merwe's comedic approach was rooted in everyday Afrikaans life. His stories often combined rural humour, satire and moral warmth, celebrating ordinary people and their quirks. He was known for his humility and compassion, particularly toward children and the elderly.

His storytelling style has been compared to that of Jan Spies, though van der Merwe was noted for his more animated and theatrical delivery.

== Legacy ==
Tolla van der Merwe remains an iconic figure in Afrikaans entertainment. His audio recordings continue to sell decades after his death, and reruns of his television appearances are still broadcast occasionally. His passing was described by contemporaries as leaving "a void in the Afrikaans comedic landscape."

A biographical book, Konsert van die lewe, was later published in his memory.

== Selected filmography ==
Title	Year	Notes
Tolla is Tops	1990	Comedy film
Tough Luck	1992	Feature film
Yankee Zulu	1993	Film appearance
Kaalgat tussen die Daisies	1997	Feature film
Panic Mechanic	1997	Comedy film

== Discography ==
- Die beste uit (LP), 1985
- Weskus Rep (LP), 1991
- Rof Maar Nie Onbeskof, 1996
- Ter Nagedagtenis Aan: Tolla van der Merwe, 1943-2000 Ons Sal Jou Nooit Vergeet Nie, 2000
- Ek En Die Bobbejane, 2000
- Se Heel Beste Stories, 2007
- Bokkie, Kom Terug
- Tolla: Op Sy Beste: 1943 - 2000
- Tolla van der Merwe se 36 Gewildste Stories Vol 2
- Oeps!
- Tolla van der Merwe se 35 Gewildste Stories
- Jan & Tolla
