= Kerkenberg =

Mountain in Free State, South Africa

Coordinates: 28.504°S 29.108°E

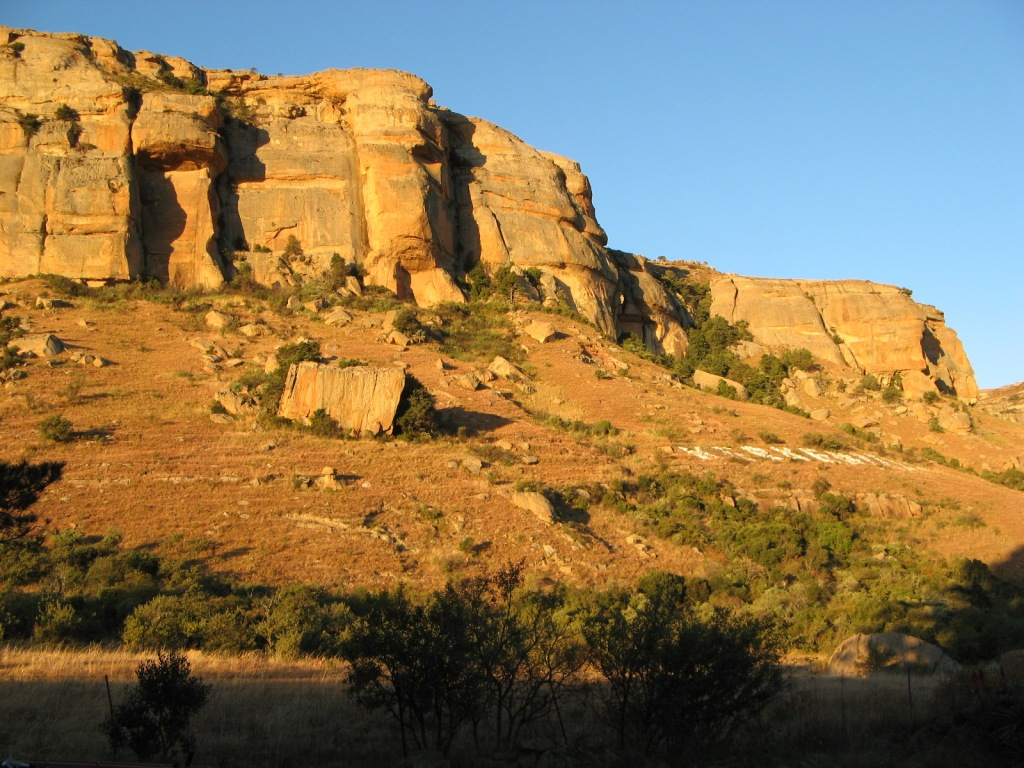

Geography

Kerkenberg is a mountain in a location in the Oliviershoek Pass Area in Free State, South Africa. Its located 32 km South of Harrismith.

== Background ==
The Voortrekkers camped there from mid-October to mid-November 1837 and from there sent out parties to find ways down the escarpment. Erasmus Smit conduct church services at the site for the treks and named Kerkenberg (Church Mountain). On 12 November Piet Retief’s daughter Debora painted his name on a rock to mark his 57th birthday.

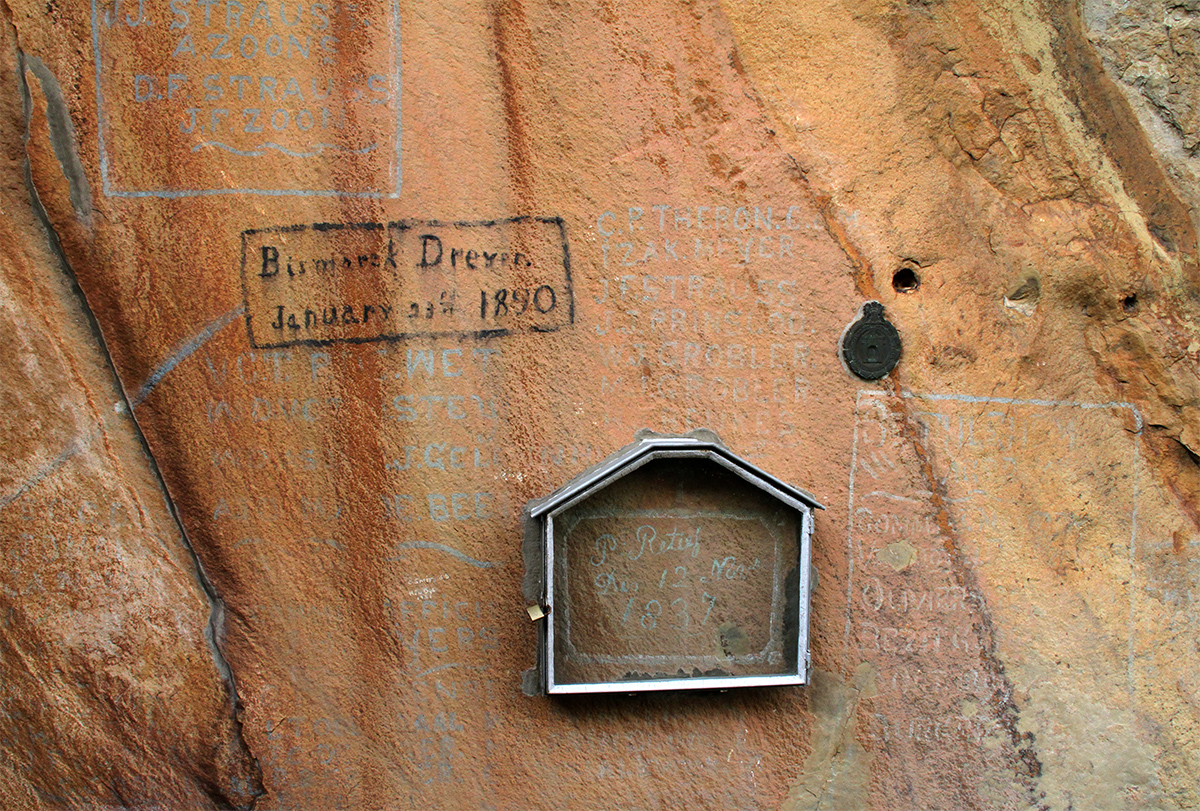
Debora Retief, daughter of voortrekker Piet Retief, painted her father's name on this rock at Kerkenberg, eastern Free State, to commemorate his 57th birthday on 12 November 1837.

On 10 October 1899, members of the Bethlehem commando also recorded their names here, when they arrived to guard a pass on the Free State border at the start of the Boer War.

The site is open to the public.
