= F. A. Venter =

South African writer (1916–1997)

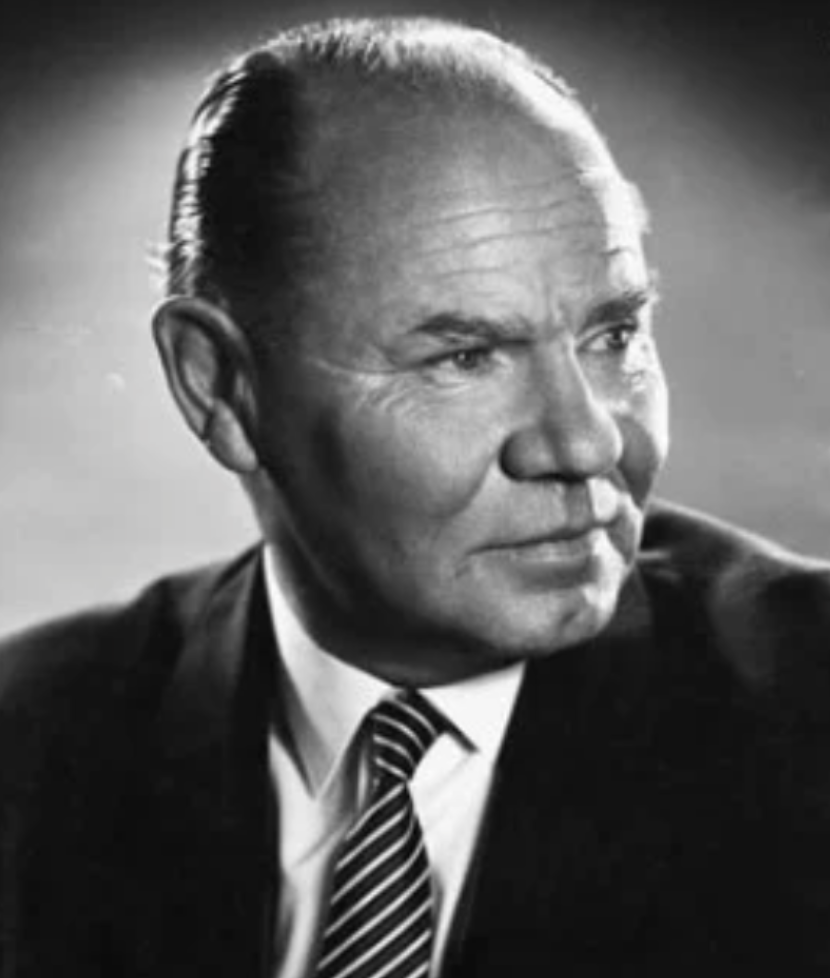
- F.A. (Frans) Venter
- Born: Francois Alwyn Venter; 27 November 1916; Hopetown, South Africa
- Died: 8 July 1997 (aged 80); Strand, South Africa
- Education: University of Stellenbosch
- Spouse: Stella Muller (m. 1941)
- Children: 2
- Writing career
- Pen name: Meiring Fouché
- Period: 1944–1995
- Genres: Afrikaans literature; Genre fiction
- Notable works: Swart Pelgrim (1951); Geknelde Land (1960); Wit Oemfaan (1965)

Francois Alwyn (Frans) Venter (27 November 1916 – 8 July 1997) was a prominent Afrikaans writer of the 20th century. His novels explored biblical religious themes, or cultural identities in the South African context. He also examined relations between white and black more closely in Wit Oemfaan, which describes a white boy's discovery of the customs of the Zulu nation. Swart Pelgrim on the other hand relates the experiences and observations of a migrant from a black rural setting to the industrialised, white-dominated environment. He may be best known for his novel Geknelde Land (Afrikaans for Afflicted Land), which describes the Eastern Cape Boer community living under Xhosa raids and the English governance of the 19th century.

== Early life ==
Venter was born in Hopetown and grew up on his parents' farm in the Britstown district. He attended rural farm schools at first, then Strydenburg Secondary School, matriculating from Hopetown High School in 1934. He studied at the University of Stellenbosch, where he obtained a BA degree. His interest in writing and journalism was already clear at that time, as he became the sub-editor of Die Stellenbosse Student, serving alongside future Afrikaans writers such as Ernst van Heerden, Audrey Blignault and W.A. de Klerk.

== Adult career ==
Venter wanted to complete an MA degree as well but had to halt his studies due to financial reasons. His first job in 1938 was at Cape Town's Die Suiderstem newspaper, working alongside writers such as Abraham Jonker and E.B. Grosskopf. After a stint in 1941 at Pretoria newspaper Die Volkstem, under editor C.S. Coetzee, he returned to Die Suiderstem in Cape Town, where he became parliamentary reporter and news editor.

In 1946, he was appointed as the editor of Die Suidwes-Afrikaner, the official newspaper of the United National South West Party in Windhoek, South West Africa (now Namibia). Through the close alliance of the UNSWP with South Africa's United Party, Venter moved to Johannesburg in 1952 to become the United Party's head of information. For a short period, he had ambitions to get involved in politics but was not very successful. After losing an election in South West Africa as a candidate for the UNSWP, he tried again in 1953 for the United Party but lost again.

For 25 years, he worked as a journalist in Cape Town, Pretoria, Windhoek and Johannesburg. He also wrote popular fiction, under the pseudonyms Meiring Fouché, Elske te Water, René Stegmann and Marius de Jongh. In 1960, he began farming in the Kenhardt district near Vanwyksvlei, where his parents had resided since the 1930s. In 1967, he had to leave the northern Cape due to declining health and settled in Strand, meaning to write full-time. In 1970, however, he returned to farming, this time as viticulturist at Vredendal in the Olifants river valley. In 1976 when his health deteriorated again, he retired for good from farming and returned to Strand.

== Recognition ==
Venter received the Hertzog Prize for prose in 1961 for his novels Swart Pelgrim and Geknelde land. For Kambrokind he received the ruitertrofee ('equestrian trophy') of the Suid-Afrikaanse Federasie van Rapportryerskorpse in 1982. In 1981, the University of Port Elizabeth awarded him the honorary degree D. Litt in recognition for his writings. In 1996, he received the Andrew Murray Prize for Literature. He was in addition a member of the Maatschappij der Nederlandse Letterkunde (a Dutch society for literature).

F.A. Venter died on 8 July 1997.

== Works ==
=== Writing as F.A. Venter ===
- Die Geheim van die Berg (The mystery of the mountain) (1944)
- Die Gebondenes: Kortverhale (The fettered) (1949)
- Eenderse Morge (Similar morgen) (1950)
- Swart Pelgrim (Black pilgrim) (1951). Winner of the Hertzog Prize, 1961.
- Die Drosters (The deserters) (1952)
- Die Tollenaar (The tax collector) (1955)
- Man van Ciréne (Man of Cyrene) (1957)
- Geknelde Land (Afflicted land) (1960). Winner of the Hertzog Prize, 1961.
- Offerland (Land of sacrifice) (1963)
- Werfjoernaal (Yard journal) (1965)
- Wit Oemfaan: Gegrond op die verhaal van die Voortrekkerseun Ferdinand van Gas soos aangeteken deur Gustav S Preller (White umfane) (1965)
- Gelofteland (Land of the covenant) (1966)
- Bedoelde Land (Intended land) (1968)
- Die Rentmeesters (The landlords) (1969)
- Water (Water) (1970). Commissioned by the Ministry of Water.
- Die Middag Voel Na Warm As (The afternoon feels like warm ash) (1974)
- Kambro-kind: 'n Jeugreis (Kambro child) (1979)
- Die Koning se Wingerd (The king's vineyard) (1984)
- Die Ou Man en die Duif (The old man and the dove) (1987)
- Die Keer Toe Ek My Naam Vergeet Het (The time when I forgot my name) (1995)
- Van Botterkraal na Altena: Hoogtepunte Uit Vier Outobiografiese Romans (From Botterkraal to Altena: highlights from four autobiographical novels) (1996)

=== Writing as Meiring Fouché ===
==== Die Swart Luiperd series ====
Die Swart Luiperd (The Black Leopard) was a series of popular Afrikaans pulp fiction, originally written in the early 1950s by Abraham Le Roux Botha, under the pseudonym Braam Le Roux. After his death in 1956, the series was continued by Venter, writing as Meiring Fouché.

46. Die Reus van Boendoe (1958)
47. Vlamme van Verraad (1958)
48. Monsters van die Moerasse (1959)
49. Afgrond van Wraak (1959)
50. Woud van Onheil (1959)
51. Vlam van Wraak (1959)
52. Sluiers oor die Woud (1959)
53. Prinses van die Arende (1959)
54. Woud van Waansin (1959)
55. Rampokkers van die Paradys (1960)
56. Die Legende van Kumara (1960
57. Die Monsters van Komo (1960)
58. Monsters van die Bambiberge (1960)
59. Die Purper Arend (1960)
60. Avontuur in die Kongo (1960)
61. Moord in die Oerwoud (1961)
62. Seun van die Swart Luiperd (1961)
63. Slagoffer vir die Slanggod (1961)
64. Dodelike druppels (1961)
65. Die plaag uit Egipte (1961)
66. Renostermanne van die Moraberge (1962)
67. Die geheim van die Begrafplaas van die Olifante (1962)
68. Watergraf vir die Oerwoudman (1962)
69. Leeuspore tussen die lyke (1962)
70. Die verlore stam (1962)

==== Sahara-Avontuur series ====
1. Heks van die Sahara (1956)
2. Spore na die Dood (1956)
3. Die Skarlaken Ruiters (1956)
4. Wraak van die Woestyn (1956)
5. Die fort is Stil (1956)
6. Dood met Sonop (1957)
7. Dreunende Hoewe (1957)
8. Bloed voor die Son (1957)
9. Die Spore Roep (1957)
10. Mademoiselle Julie (1957)
11. Wraak van die Sabel (1958)
12. Bloedige Robyne (1958)
13. Bloed oor die Duine (1958)
14. Duine van die Dood (1958)
15. Dreigende Daeraad (1958)
16. Bouvalle van die Dood (1958)
17. Gaste van die Dood (1959)
18. Bitter die Wraak (1959)
19. Vlamme in die Tempel (1959)
20. Strik van die Dood (1959)
21. Die Dodelike Sluipers (1959)
22. Nag van Geweld (1959)
23. Bloed oor die Bouvalle (1959)
24. Spelonk van verskrikking (1959)
25. Skaduwee van Gister (1959)
26. Storm oor Dini-Salam (1960)
27. Die Skatte van Marabash (1960)
28. Wraak in die Woestynvesting (1960)
29. Stille Dood oor die Sahara (1960)
30. Die Verraaier van Dini-Salam (1961)
31. Graf in die Woestyn (1961)
32. Vlamme in die Woestyn (1961)
33. Noodroep uit die Woestyn (1961)
34. Spore van Verraad (1961)
35. Die Raaisel van Aber-El-Mir (1961)
36. 'n Teken in die Nag (1962)
37. Die swaard van Verwoesting (1962)
38. Vuurpeleton... Lê Aan! (1962)
39. Die Bloedbad van Goras (1962)
40. Die Geheim van Fort Laval (1963)

=== Writing as René Stegmann ===
- Vrou uit die Vreemde (1967)
- Teen 'n Afgrond (1967)
- Die Vrou van Schoonegevel (1968)
- Doktersvrou op Oude Bosch (1968)
- Die Kampvegter (1969)
- Kringe en Kartels (1969)

=== Writing as Marius de Jongh ===
- Die Waters van Toringberg (1966)
- Die Oë van Okatura (1968)
- Son en Smarag (1968)

=== Writing as Elske te Water ===
- Stryd in die Lower (1967)
