= Die Suidwes-Afrikaner =

- Founded: 1927
- Language: Afrikaans
- Ceased publication: 1976
- Country: South West Africa

Die Suidwes-Afrikaner (1927-1976) was the official newspaper of the United National South West Party (UNSWP), a political party in South West Africa with close ties to the United Party in South Africa. The UNSWP was incorporated into the UP in 1971.

== History ==
The Windhoek publisher John Meinert decided in 1927 that an Afrikaans language paper was needed to complement the English language Windhoek Advertiser and the German language Allgemeine Zeitung. Ernst Schlengemann accepted the post of editor. The first edition was published on April 8, 1927, the second-Afrikaans-speaking daily after the short-lived Suidwes Nuus (1922-1923). Die Suidwes-Afrikaner was initially meant to be a voice for Afrikaners in SWA, where Dutch and English in 1920 had replaced German (the former colonial power's tongue) as the official language. The editor grew the paper into a major political factor and later ran as a candidate for the UNSWP for the 1929 legislative elections. Schlengemann ran for the Windhoek-Sentraal constituency, but lost in a landslide to the National Party of South West Africa candidate. In 1929, he represented South West Africa at the foundation of the Federasie van Afrikaanse Kultuurverenigings in Bloemfontein. On May 8, 1930, he died of pneumonia in Windhoek Central Hospital. He wrote the first Afrikaans poem written in SWA, "Die Namib-woestyn."

Die Suidwes-Afrikaner endured longer as an opposition UP mouthpiece than any Afrikaans-language UP paper in South Africa. The growth in popularity of Die Suidwester (the NP newspaper) so overwhelmed its competitor in readership that the UP paper stopped publishing in 1976. At the end of 1977, Die Republikein emerged under editor Jan Spies as a competitor to Die Suidwester, which won the battle on December 21, 1990, when Die Suidwester was forced to change from daily to twice-weekly and ultimately weekly publication.

== Sources ==
- Böeseken, Dr. A. J., Krüger, Prof. D. W. and Kieser, Dr. A. 1953. Drie eeue. Die verhaal van ons vaderland. (Three Stories: The Story of Our Fatherland") Cape Town: Nasionale Boekhandel.
- Krüger, Prof. D.W. 1978. The making of a nation. A history of the Union of South Africa, 1910-1961. Johannesburg & London: Macmillan.
- Potgieter, D.J. (ed.) 1972. Standard Encyclopaedia of Southern Africa. Cape Town: Nasionale Opvoedkundige Uitgewery (Nasou).
- Van der Spuy, D.C. (chief ed.). 1975. Amptelike Jaarboek van die Republiek van Suid-Afrika 1975 (First Edition). Pretoria: Departement van Inligting.
- (af) Afrikanergeskiedenis: Namibië (Suidwes-Afrikaner). URL accessed 2 November 2016.
