= Die Swart Luiperd =

South African series of pulp novels

The Black Leopard (Afrikaans: Die Swart Luiperd) is a South African series of pulp novels featuring Leon Fouché, an adventurer resembling Lee Falk's The Phantom. The novels, published by Pronkboeke, an imprint of Die Goeie Hoop Uitgewers (Edms.) Bpk, were written first by Abraham Le Roux Botha using the pen name Braam le Roux, and, following his death in 1956, by F.A. Venter using the pen name Meiring Fouché. The series ran from approximately 1948 to 1963.

Leon Fouché is the Black Leopard. He travels far afield seeking adventure on his horse, Donker, with his two leopards, Simson and Spikkels. He uses no firearms, only his hunting knife and bow and arrow. His wife, Sonet, and his son, Bennie, accompany him later in the series. He has been compared to Lee Falk's The Phantom, but also, together with another contemporary hero of Afrikaans pulp fiction, Rooi Jan, with Edgar Rice Burroughs' Tarzan.

An unrelated photo comic by the same title appeared later; its primary hero, Baron Rolf du Plessis, wears a leopard mask.

== Books in the Black Leopard series written by Braam le Roux ==
1. Gemaskerde Moordenaars (Masked Murderers)
2. Die Mensvreters van Tsawo (The Maneaters of Tsawo)
3. Kamerade van die Draak (Comrades of the Dragon)
4. Die Kruipende Dood (The Creeping Death)
5. Die Eiland van die Blou Duiwels (The Island of the Blue Devils)
6. Pyle van Vuur (Arrows of Fire)
7. Die Galg in die Oerwoud (The Gallows in the Jungle)
8. Die Mense van die Meer (The Lake People)
9. Rooi Maskers (Red Masks)
10. Die Bloedboodskap (The Blood Message)
11. Kloue van die Valk (The Falcon's Claws)
12. Skedels in die Sand (Skulls in the Sand)
13. Die Dood kom Stil (Death Comes Quietly)
14. Man Sonder Kop (Man Without a Head)
15. Die Songod Praat (The Sun God Speaks)
16. Pad van die Arend (The Path of the Eagle)
17. Die Duiwel is ‘n Vrou (The Devil is a Woman)
18. Geheim van die Wit Heks (Secret of the White Witch)
19. Gees uit die Vuur (Spirit of the Fire)
20. Waar die Dooies Leef (Where the Dead Live)
21. Dans van die Dood (Dance of Death)
22. Bloedfees van die Ape (Blood Feast of the Apes)
23. Wraak van die Gorillas (Revenge of the Gorillas)
24. Vallei van Gedrogte (Valley of Monsters)
25. Rooi is die Waters (Red are the Waters)
26. Fees van die Kopbeen (Feast of the Skull)
27. Die Watermonster Brul (The Water Monster Roars)
28. Geheim van die Berge (The Secret of the Mountains)
29. Newels van Verraad (Mists of Betrayal)
30. Bloed op die Maan (Blood on the Moon)
31. Die Laaste Kreet (The Last Cry)
32. Die Groot Voël Sterf (The Great Bird Dies)
33. Geheim van die Groen Hel (The Secret of the Green Hell)
34. Spoor na die Onbekende (Tracks into the Unknown)
35. Manne van die Maan (Men from the Moon)
36. Draer van die bloedstene (Wearers of the Blood Stones)
37. Die gorillas kom (The Gorillas are coming)
38. Tiere van die Heilige Woud (Tigers of the Sacred Forest)
39. Vegters van die Slanggod (Warriors of the Serpent God)
40. Goud en assegaaie (Gold and Spears)
41. Die jagters van Bloedeiland (The Hunters of Blood Island)
42. Kettings in die oerwoud (Chains in the Jungle)
43. Oog van die Songod (Eye of the Sungod)
44. Wraak van die woud (Revenge of the Forest)
45. Bloed van die Maagd (Blood of the Virgin)

== Books in the series by Meiring Fouché ==
46. Die Reus van Boendoe (The Giant of Boendoe)
47. Vlamme van Verraad (Flames of Betrayal)
48. Monster van die moerasse (Swamp Monster)
49. Afgrond van Wraak (Pit of Revenge)
50. Woud van Onheil (Forest of Evil)
51. Vlam van wraak (Flame of Revenge)
52. Sluiers oor die woud (Veils over the Forest)
53. Prinses van die Arende deur Meiring Fouché (Princes of the Eagles by Meiring Fouché)
54. Woud van Waansin (Forest of Madness)
55. Rampokkers van die Paradys (Gangsters of the Paradise)
56. Die Legende van Kumara (The Legend of Kumara)
57. Die Monsters van Komo (The Monsters of Komo)
58. Monsters van die Bambiberge (Monsters of the Bambi Mountains)
59. Die Purper Arend (The Purple Eagle)
60. Moord in die Oerwoud (Murder in the Jungle)
61. Renostermanne van die Moraberge (Rhinoceros Men of the Mora Mountains)
62. Leeuspore tussen die lyke (Lion Tracks between the Bodies)
63. Slagoffer vir die Slanggod (A Sacrifice for the Snake God)
64. Die swart Luiperd (The Black Panther)
65. Die plaag uit Egipte (The Plague from Egypt)
66. Seun van die Swart Luiperd (Son of the Black Panther)
67. Dodelike druppels (Deadly Drops)
68. Die verlore stam (The lost Tribe)
69. Avontuur in die Kongo (Adventures in The Congo)
70. Die geheim van die Begrafplaas van die Olifante (The Secret of the Elephants' Graveyard)
