= Jan Spies =

Namibian writer

- Born: Johannes Petrus Spies; 30 June 1936; The farm Sekretarispan, Mariental, Namibia
- Died: 4 January 1996 (aged 59); Windhoek, Namibia
- Occupation: Writer
- Spouse: Beatrice Spies
- Children: Barend Spies, Willem Spies
- Writing career
- Genres: Comedy, satire

Johannes Petrus Spies (30 June 1936 – 4 January 1996) was a Namibian author and popular storyteller. Alongside P.G. du Plessis he was the presenter of the popular television program Spies en Plessie – met permissie, and hosted personalities like Tolla van der Merwe, Koos Meyer, Danny Pretorius, Nico Nel and Pyp de Villiers.

== Life and work ==
=== Early life ===
Spies was born on 30 June 1936 on the farm Sekretarispan in the district of Mariental in South West Africa as the oldest of three children with two younger sisters. His father was originally from Standerton and his mother from Willowmore in South Africa. His parents emigrated to South West Africa after the First World War after South Africa took over the administration of South West Africa. They received cheap land from the government to farm on. Up to standard four, he attended the farm school at Stampriet, which was primarily aimed at giving the children agricultural training. He completed his primary school career in Windhoek and matriculated in 1955 at Windhoek High School. After that he first studied Theology and later Literature at the University of Pretoria, where in 1959 he was editor of the student magazine Die Perdeby and also served on the student council. At an Afrikaanse Studentebond Kunsfees he won first prize as a landscape painter and in 1961 he won the Wolnit trophy as an orator. He holds a B.A. degree and a B.A. Honors degree. After his honors degree he registered with the Transvaal Education Department as a teacher. In 1962 he obtained the M.A. degree in Afrikaans literature with a dissertation on 'n Stilistiese analise van 'Ringdans van die hamerkoppe' van D.J. Opperman. He married Beatrice in 1961, whom he met in standard eight in high school, and they had two sons, Barend and Willem.

=== Career ===
After his studies he worked for one and a half years at the Department of Mining. From April 1963 he was a lecturer in Afrikaans at the Transvaal Training Institute for Indian Teachers in Fordsburg and during this period he obtained his Higher Education Diploma at the Johannesburg College of Education. From January 1970 to June 1977 he was involved as a lecturer at the Rand Afrikaans University. Here he obtained his doctorate in 1974 under the guidance of Professor F.I.J. van Rensburg with a dissertation on Die motiewe van ondergang en verlossing in die poësie van D.J. Opperman. In 1974 he was promoted to senior lecturer. He has been known nationwide since 1974 with his donkey stories and later general stories that are broadcast on the morning program Monitor of the Afrikaans Radio Service of the SABC. Later he joins P.G. du Plessis as hosts in the popular television program Spies en Plessie.

=== Anti-apartheid stance ===
From his student years he was a staunch opponent of apartheid and when the constitutional negotiations for independence in Namibia gained momentum, he moved back to his native country in 1977, where he farmed part-time on his the Swartberg near Usakos. He then became editor of the new newspaper Die Republikein, which supported the political party the Democratic Turnhalle Alliance with Dirk Mudge as leader. In 1986 he retired as editor, but until his death was still involved with the newspaper as policy editor, while also serving as director on the board of the Republican Press in Windhoek.

=== Later years and death ===
In the years shortly before his death he was involved in a number of accidents. In 1994, he was involved in a car accident when he hit a kudu near his farm. Shortly afterwards, he was dipping goats on the farm, when he lost his balance and fell upside down on his head top of the dip hole and was badly bruised and suffered a fracture to his pubic bone. In April 1995, the scaffolding with which he loaded ostriches onto a bakkie broke and he broke his arm in the fall. Spies died on 4 January 1996 in Windhoek of multiple organ failure, three weeks after he was seriously injured in a car accident.

== Writing ==
=== Poetry ===
He made his debut as a writer with the poetry collection Voetvolk. The volume is dedicated to Mervyn Kahn, his best friend at the Indian College. In the title, a crowd of ordinary people as well as an army are suggested, but one who should not shoot but write. The poems in this volume are related to folk verses, but despite points of contact with words and writing, the erotic boorishness and neologisms are spoken with their own voice and bring their own message. Social and political critique is delivered and art theory is considered, while more earthly matters like donkeys, the barren world of South West Africa and its people are also discussed. Religious matters are also involved, reflecting on the saving power of the gospel that has become perverted and thus lost its power. Begrafnis op Saterdag depicts the parallel events of a funeral and a rugby match, where penalty kicks also indicates death. Some of his poems appear in the literary magazine Standpunte. The singer Arina de Witt sets the tone of his poems and publishes them on the CD Arina de Witt sing Jan Spies, published in 2005. His poems are included in several anthologies, including Groot verseboek, Die Afrikaanse poësie in 'n duisend en enkele gedigte, Voorspraak and Miskien sal ek die wingerd prys.

=== Storybooks ===
The stories he tells on radio and on television and on other occasions are bundled together in four volumes, Pilatus tot molshoop, Poort deur die koue, Profeet met kondensmelk and Pille vir servette.

Pilatus tot molshoop contains the stories Van Duiwel Pontius na Dominee Pilatus and 'n Berg is nie 'n molshoop nie, where does the bundle derives its name from. In the first story, in his dream Elder Piet rather helps the pastor than the devil, after which the devil sends him to hell out of sheer despondency. In the second story, a young male from the Department of Agriculture is in trouble for his invention to eradicate moles, because he does not understand that moles can only be caught in silence and are frightened by sound, even if it is the most beautiful music. Peculiar to some of the entertaining narratives is the exaggeration, which with rendering abundant detail creates an impression of realism, until the conclusion indicates how wrong the person is. There are also some stories about cars, such as the Ford who goes into hiding in the cattle kraal and another story where the Ford brings an angel to the farm one night. Van Duiwel Pontius na Dominee Pilatus was recorded by Abraham H. de Vries in Die Afrikaanse kortverhaalboek.

Poort deur die koue title story tells how the policeman and the Roman priest got to know and understand each other better with the help of half a bottle of brandy on a cold night. In 'n Emmer tanne vir 'n hospitaal holbekke a young nurse makes a plan to faster clean the old people's false teeth which creates more work. There are also Die kwaai oorlidde ounôi, where a baboon comes to haunt the place of a deceased peasant woman. The stories are meant for listening rather than reading, but the enjoyment of fine sayings and folk tales are sustained in texts.

Profeet met kondensmelk title story has the first Afrikaans Bible in 1933s publication as a theme, where the pastor practiced for weeks that the children would each present a Bible book and with such a scarf then take his place on stage, from Genesis to Revelation. The boy who has to introduce Habakkuk does not like his name and is afraid that he will be mocked and wants to exchange with another on the evening before the ceremony, barterting with a can of condensed milk. Thus the children change their name, but still retain the studied order, so that the new Bible is presented as a confused affair. In Pape se plan the magistrate's sins catch up with him and Pape can free his son Kolie from the charge of illegal gemsbok shooting. The devil in Verslae Satan meets his match against when a peasant woman puts him in his place. These bundles of stories conclude with the collection in Pille vir servette. 'n Slagveld is a story from the Anglo Boer War, when a commando, after having had nothing to eat for a long time, got hold of a pork and raw peanuts. They devoured it that evening, but did not take into account the effect it has on their digestion. By morning everyone had stomach problems and as they drove away there was a smell of gunpowder fumes over the valley. These bundles are later merged into the omnibus Spieserye, while P.G. du Plessis has a selection published as Spies op sy stukke. In 1992 the Rapportryers Prize for a deserving Afrikaans publication was awarded to Spieserye. More than one CD is released on which he tells the stories himself.

=== Anthologies ===
His work is also included in anthologies Borde borde boordevol and Vuurslag, both edited by Hennie Aucamp, Die Afrikaanse kortverhaalboek and Steekbaard, both edited by Abraham H. de Vries and Vertellers and Vertellers 2 by Merwe Scholtz.

=== Drama ===
In addition to his stories and poems, he also writes sixteen lyrics that he sets to music himself. He also compiles the volume Klein begin in die drama, in which he compiles a number of dramas for pupils and provides them with accompanying questions.

== Publications ==
Year	Publications
1975	Voetvolk
1977	Pilatus tot molshoop
1984	Poort deur die koue
	Profeet met kondensmelk
1987	Pille vir servette
1988	Spieserye
1990	Spies op sy stukke
