= Robert's Drift =

Farmstead in Mpumalanga, South Africa

Coordinates: 27°1′46″S 29°1′5.9″E

Robert's Drift (or Roberts Drift) is a farmstead located in Mpumalanga, South Africa. The estimated terrain elevation above sea level is 1,537 metres (5,043 ft).
