= South African Wars (1879–1915) =

Series of conflicts

The South African Wars, including but also known as the Confederation Wars, were a series of wars that occurred in the southern portion of the African continent between 1879 and 1915. Ethnic, political, and social tensions between European colonial powers and indigenous Africans led to increasing hostilities, culminating in a series of wars and revolts, which had lasting repercussions on the entire region. A key factor behind the growth of these tensions was the pursuit of commerce and resources, both by countries and individuals, especially following the discoveries of gold in the region in 1862 and diamonds in 1867.

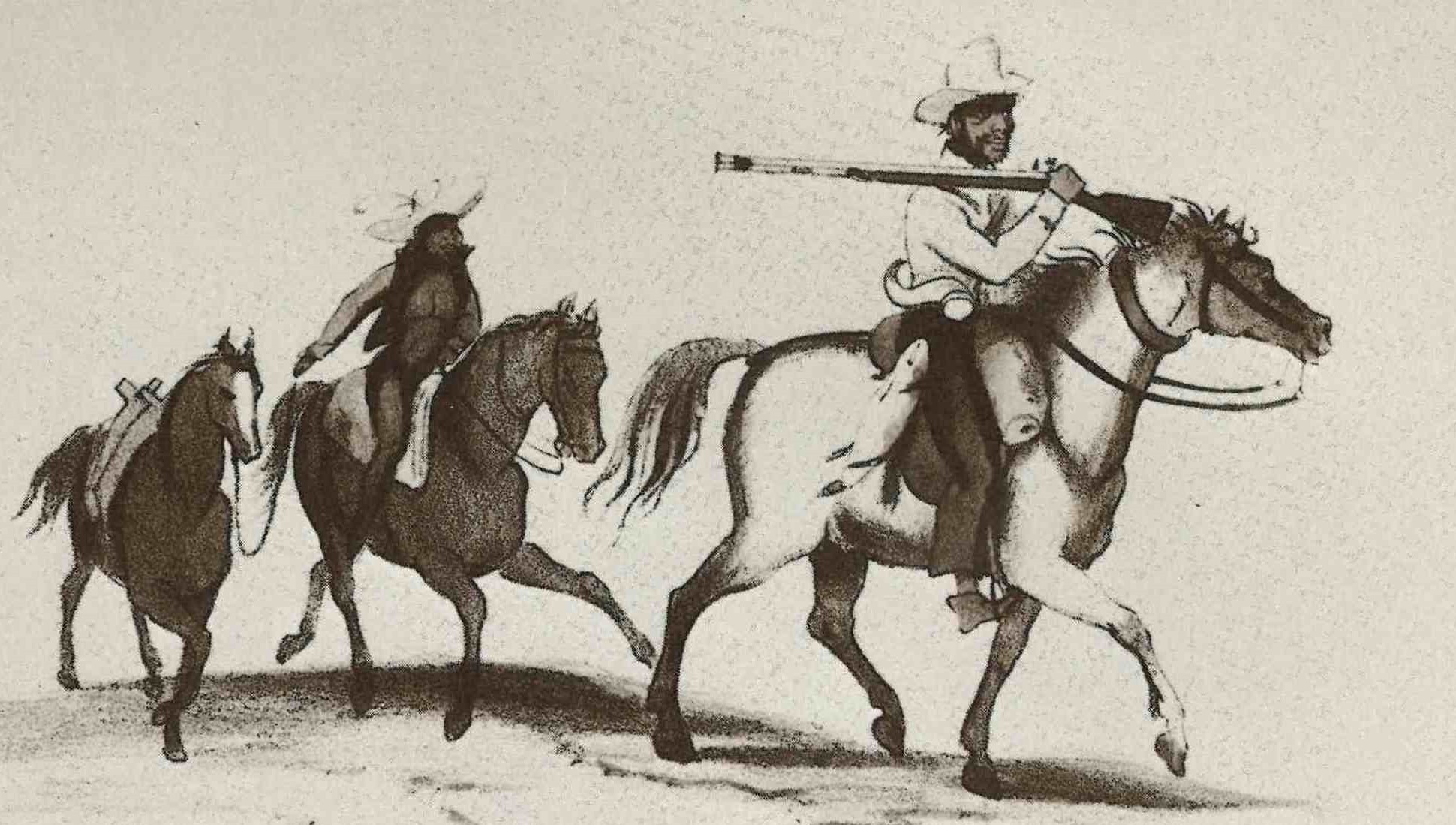
Sketch of the unknown soldier. Southern African militiaman – possibly Cape Colony Khoekhoe or Boer – with an after-rider and two horses in support.

Conflicts such as the First and Second Boer Wars, the Anglo-Zulu War, the Sekhukhune Wars, the Basotho Gun War, the Xhosa Wars, and other concurrent conflicts are typically considered separate events. However, they have also been viewed as outbreaks in a far larger continuous wave of change and conflict in the region, beginning with the Confederation Wars of the 1870s and 80s, escalating with the rise of Cecil Rhodes and the struggle for control of southern Africa's gold and diamonds and more, and leading up to the Second Anglo-Boer War and the establishment of the Union of South Africa in 1910.

== Territory ==
Political map of Southern Africa in 1885

As European powers – particularly Dutch Boers and the British – began to claim parts of southern Africa, it became apparent that expansion was imperative in order to maintain their political positions. The relationships and boundaries among them became exceedingly more complex, affecting not only themselves but the indigenous African peoples and the land itself.

By 1880, there were four dominant European regions. The Cape Colony and Natal were to some degree under British control, and the Transvaal (South African Republic) and Orange Free State were independent republics controlled by the Boers. These colonies and their political leaders were the most important and influential of the time, and all were eventually dissolved into the singular Union of South Africa in May 1910.

=== Cape Colony ===
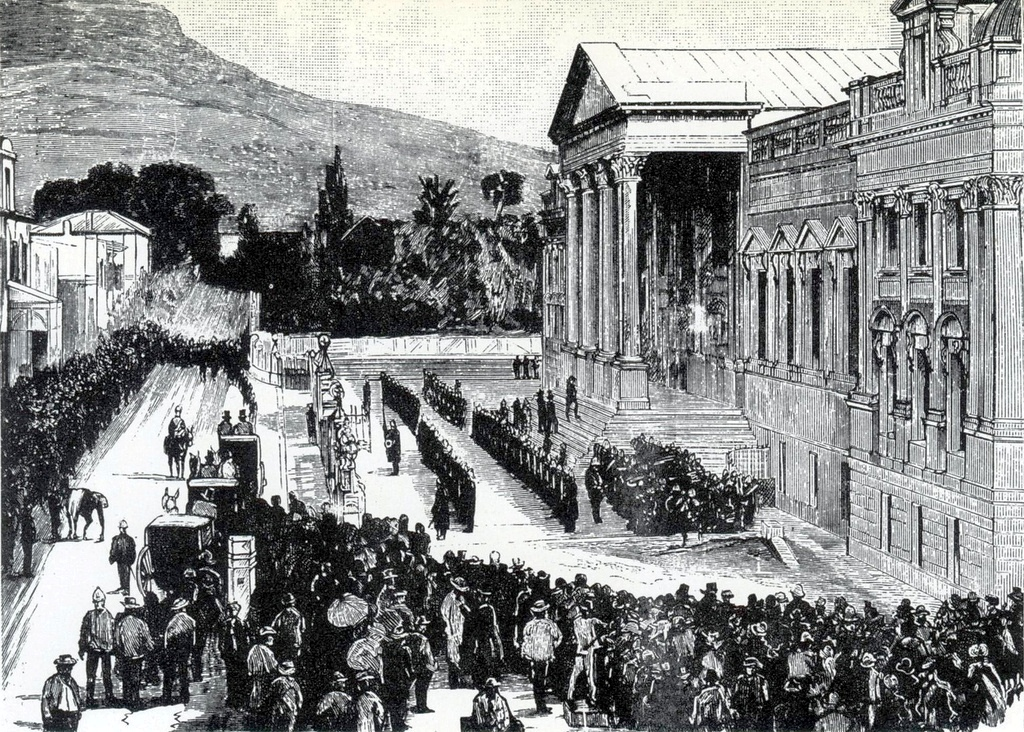
The Cape Parliament's opening (1885)

The Cape Colony was founded by the Dutch East India Company in 1652. In 1795, it was taken over by the British, who were officially granted possession of the Cape by the Netherlands in 1815. At this time, the Cape Colony encompassed 100,000 square miles (260,000 km^{2}) and was populated by about 26,720 people of European descent, a relative majority of whom were still of Dutch origin. The remainder were descended from German soldiers and sailors in the service of the Dutch East India Company's former administration and a large number of French Huguenot refugees who resettled there after fleeing religious persecution at home. Some of the existing colonists had become semi-nomadic pastoralists known as trekboers who frequently ventured beyond the Cape's frontier. This led to an expansion of the colony's borders and clashes with the Xhosa people over pastureland in the vicinity of the Great Fish River. Beginning in 1818, thousands of British immigrants were introduced by the colonial government to bolster the local European workforce and help populate the frontier as an additional defense against the Xhosa.

By 1871, the Cape was by far the largest and most powerful state in the region. Its northern border had been established at the Orange River, and Britain had handed over the administration of Basutoland too. The Cape was also the only state in the region to (at least officially) give people of all race's equal rights. It implemented a system of non-racial franchise – unusual in the restrictive world of the 19th century – whereby voters all qualified for the vote equally, regardless of race, on the basis of land ownership. In practice, however, it remained a European-dominated state, although in 1872 it succeeded in gaining a degree of independence from the British Empire when it successfully instituted a system of responsible government. Its government at first pursued a policy of avoiding further annexations so as to concentrate on internal development, but the South African Wars saw it annex several surrounding regions: Griqualand East, 1874; Griqualand West, 1880; and Southern Bechuanaland, 1895.

At the end of the South African Wars, the Cape Colony, Natal, Orange Free State, and the Transvaal were united. The Cape Colony became a member of the Union of South Africa in 1910, and today is divided between three of the modern provinces of South Africa.

=== Sekhukhune Wars ===
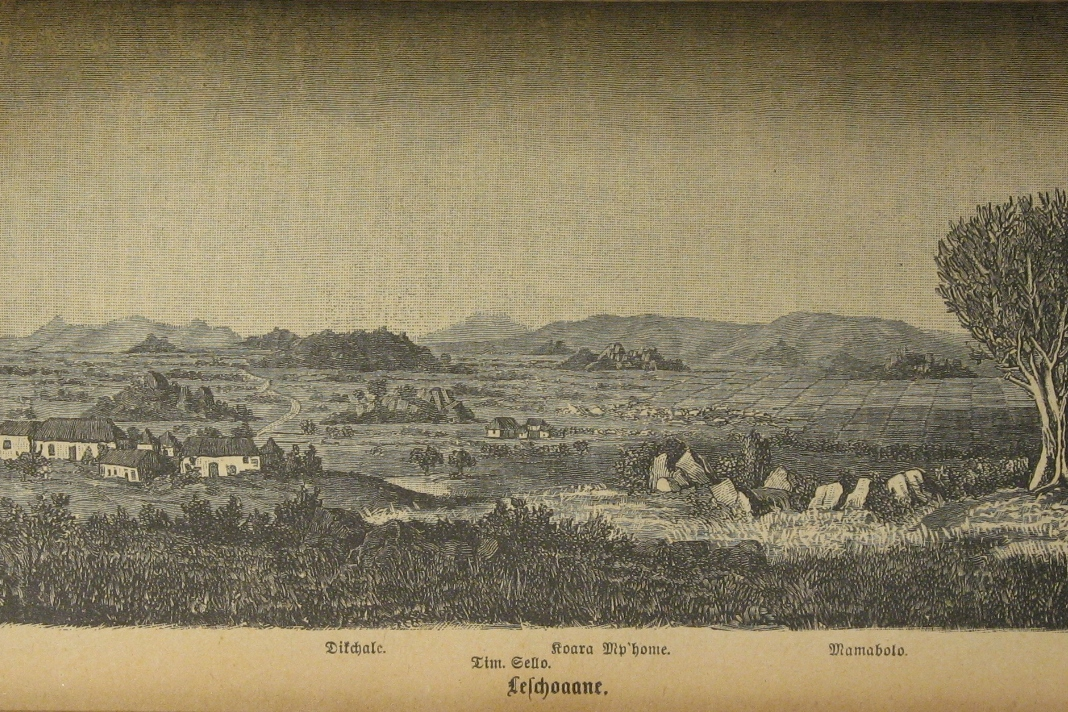
Mission station in the Transvaal, 1886

These wars took place in the home of the native Northern Sotho's. There were three separate campaigns against Sekhukhune, Paramount King of Bapedi i.e., the First Sekhukhune War of 1876 conducted by the Boers, and the two separate campaigns of the Second Sekhukhune War of 1876-1879 conducted by the British. Sekhukhune considered Sekhukhuneland to be independent and not subject to the Transvaal Republic and refused to allow miners from the Pilgrim's Rest goldfields to prospect on his side of the Steelpoort River.

The inability of the Zuid-Afrikaansche Republiek (ZAR; 'Transvaal Republic') under President Francois Burgers to score a decided victory in the Sekhukhune War, presented the opportunity to the British to annex Transvaal in 1877. Soon afterward, Britain declared war against Sekhukhune, Paramount King of Bapedi. After three unsuccessful attempts, he was finally defeated by two British regiments under Sir Garnet Wolseley, assisted by 8 000 Swazis and other auxiliaries. Many of the Bapedi armies were killed, including Sekhukhune's heir, Morwamotshe, and three of his brothers. The Anglo-Pedi War suffered both the British and Boer armies greatly as well as they fell and perished in great numbers too.

By the 1870s, the Transvaal was crumbling under Boer rule. In 1877, at the outset of the South African Wars, the British under Theophilus Shepstone annexed the state, and the Boers were forced to cede their independence in exchange for a small pension. The British defeating local natives to secure more land in 1879 only gave the Boers less competition to worry about and enabled them to focus on retaking the Transvaal. In 1881 the Boers rebelled and the First Anglo-Boer War ensued. In this war, power was regained by the Boers, though any possibility of expansion and alliance was blocked by the British. With the discovery of diamonds around 1885 in Griqualand, West Transvaal struggled with the Cape and the Free State for land, but to no avail.

At the end of the South African Wars, the Transvaal was annexed by the 1910 Union of South Africa.

=== Orange Free State ===
By the beginning of the South African Wars, the Orange Free State was independently ruled by the Boers. The Free State's boundaries were defined almost entirely by rivers: the Orange River on the south, the Vaal River on the west and north, and the Caledon River on the east. The northeastern boundary was shared with its British neighbor, Natal. The Caledon boundary was disputed with Moshoeshoe I's Sotho people and fought over in two primary incidents – in 1858 and 1865. Before the Boer colonization, there were indigenous groups like the Sotho, San, and various Nguni clans in the Free State area. In the 1870s the Free State Boers began moving into Griqualand West in search of farmland, pushing the Griqua out. However, they did not officially incorporate the land, which came to be disputed by Britain as well as the Griquas themselves. In 1890, there were approximately 77,000 whites and 128,000 Africans (many were servants working on white farms). In 1900, Bloemfontein, the capital, came under British domination.

At the close of the South African Wars, the Free State joined the 1910 Union of South Africa.

=== Natal ===
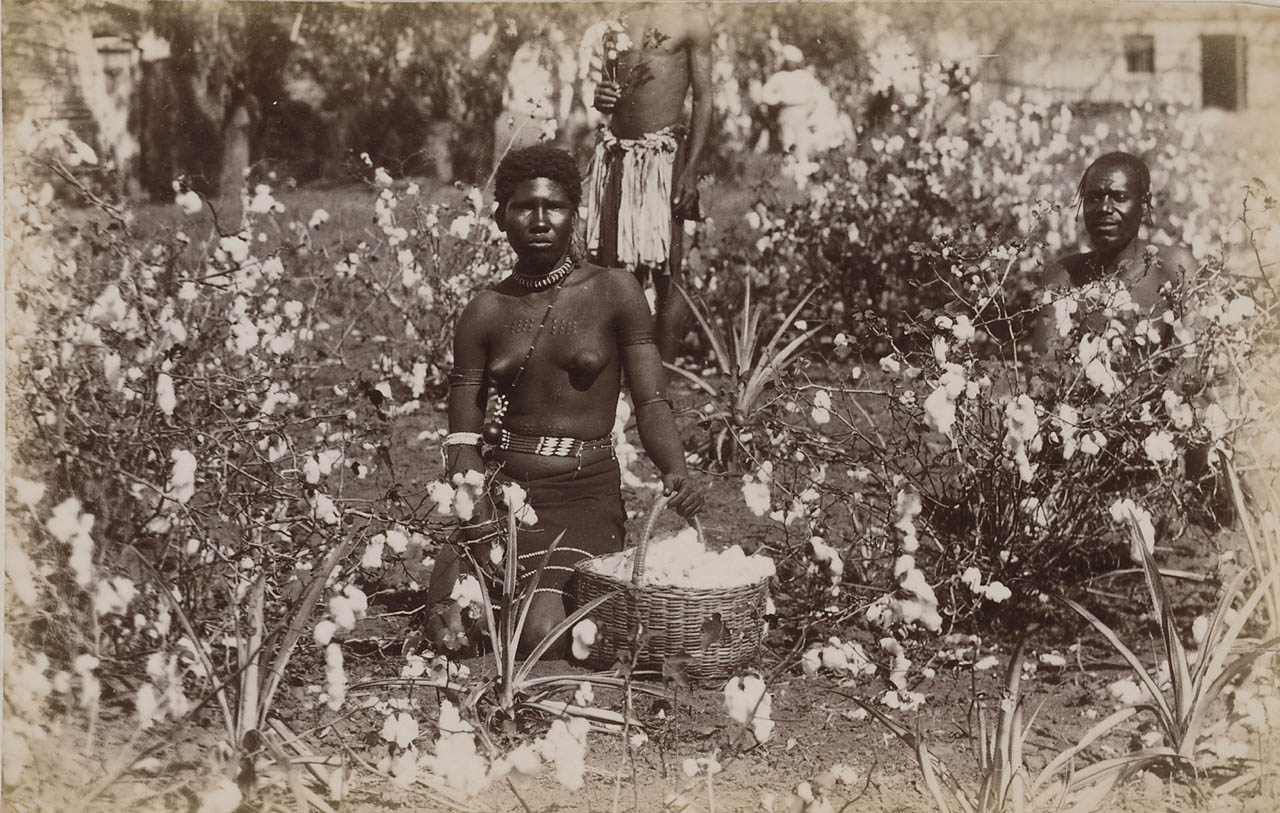
Natal cotton field (c.1885).

Natal is positioned on the Indian Ocean coast of southern Africa, just northeast of the Cape Colony. Home to the indigenous Nguni and later the Zulu, the region of Natal played a key role in European colonization. First called the Natalia Republic, the territory was set up in 1839, by Boer Voortrekkers on their "Great Trek", fleeing the Cape English. When the British established the colony four years later– as a strategic land gain – the border was extended to the Tugela and Buffalo Rivers.

In the 1870s, Natal was a British Colony, with a degree of autonomy in its local administration, but under the direct control of the appointed British Governor. It had a more restrictive political system than the neighboring Cape Colony and its small (mostly British) white population had an uneasy relationship with the powerful independent Zulu Kingdom on their northern border. The Anglo-Zulu War (1879) led to the later annexation of Zululand to Natal in 1897.

At the close of the South African Wars, the colony became part of the 1910 Union, and is now known as Kwazulu-Natal, a province of South Africa.

=== Basutoland ===
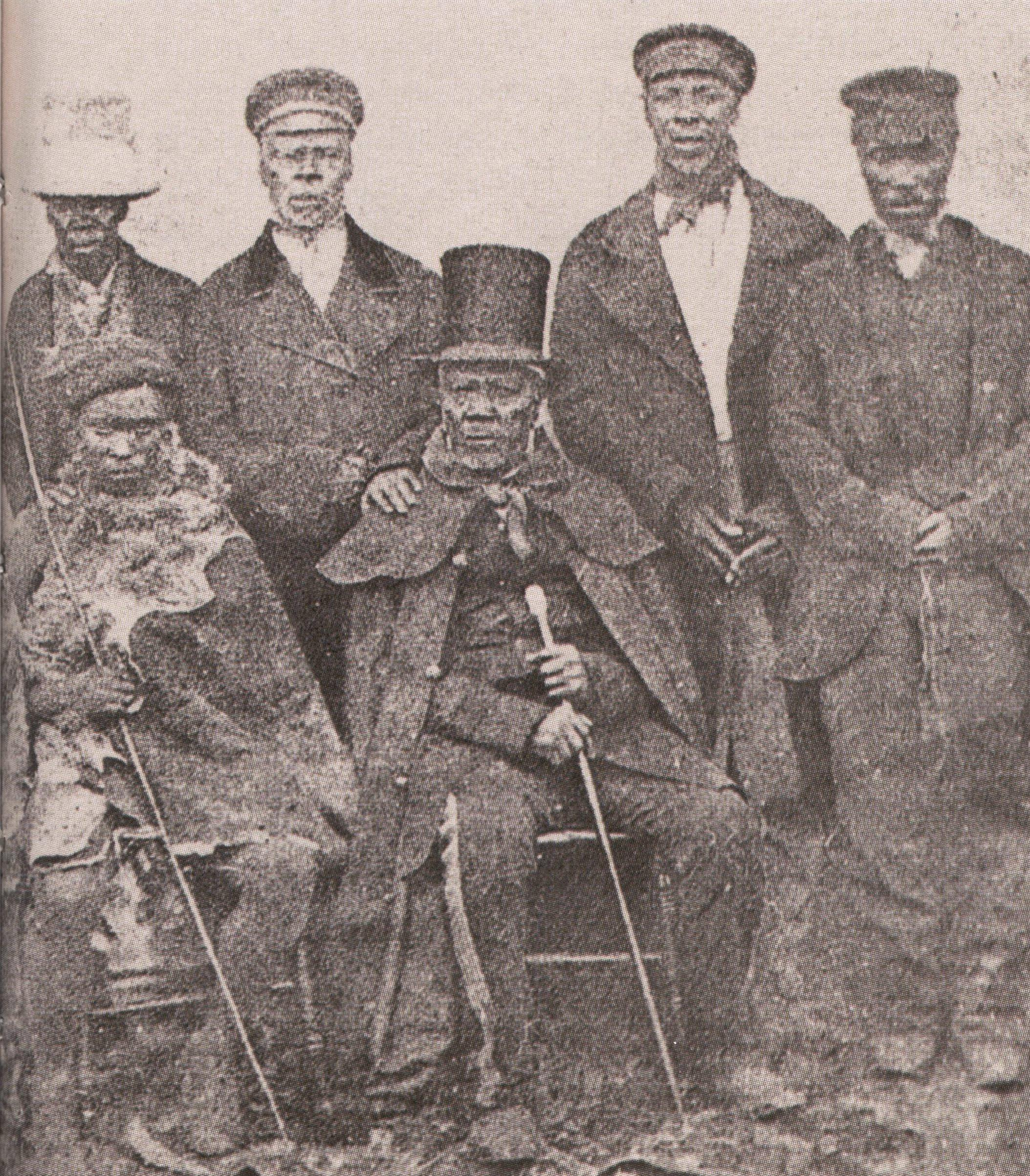
King Moshoeshoe I of Basutoland, with his ministers

The land of indigenous Khoi and Sotho people, Basutoland was positioned between the Cape Colony, Orange Free State, and Natal. Basutoland was annexed to Britain in 1868 as Moshoeshoe I, King of the Sotho, was threatened by Free State (Boer) encroachers. Three years later it was given to the Cape Colony.

In the 1870s, Basutoland was still relatively peaceful and prosperous, as the weak, indirect authority of the Cape Colony did not threaten the traditional Sotho government and the Cape preferred as little interference in Basutoland as possible. At the end of the 1870s however, an attempt by Britain and the new Sprigg Government of the Cape to enforce a more direct rule and influence the state's internal affairs led to a Sotho rebellion. In the resulting Gun War, the Sotho sharpshooters won a series of victories, and in the final 1884 peace agreement, it was returned to indirect rule, with the British preserving indigenous rule with the intent of exploiting the state's agricultural resources.

At the end of the South African Wars, still under British rule, attempts to incorporate it into the 1910 Union of South Africa failed. As a result of the disagreement, Basutoland became one of three colonies left outside of the Union – together with Bechuanaland and Swaziland. Today, Basutoland is a small independent nation called Lesotho, engulfed by South Africa.

=== Bechuanaland ===
Following the Bechuanaland Expedition of 1884–85, Bechuanaland was settled by Britain in 1885, the northern area becoming the Protectorate and the southern area, the Crown Colony of British Bechuanaland. This region was constructed between German Southwest Africa and the Transvaal as a strategic attempt to prevent the combining of those two colonies, thereby allowing them access to the Great North Road. Along with the annexation of the Crown Colony in 1895, Cecil Rhodes pushed hard for the northern Protectorate but was resisted by indigenous Tswana chiefs who successfully convinced the British to halt the annexation attempt.

At the end of the South African Wars, the Bechuanaland Protectorate was one of three states which were not incorporated into the 1910 Union of South Africa. It gained its independence in 1966 as the modern state of Botswana.

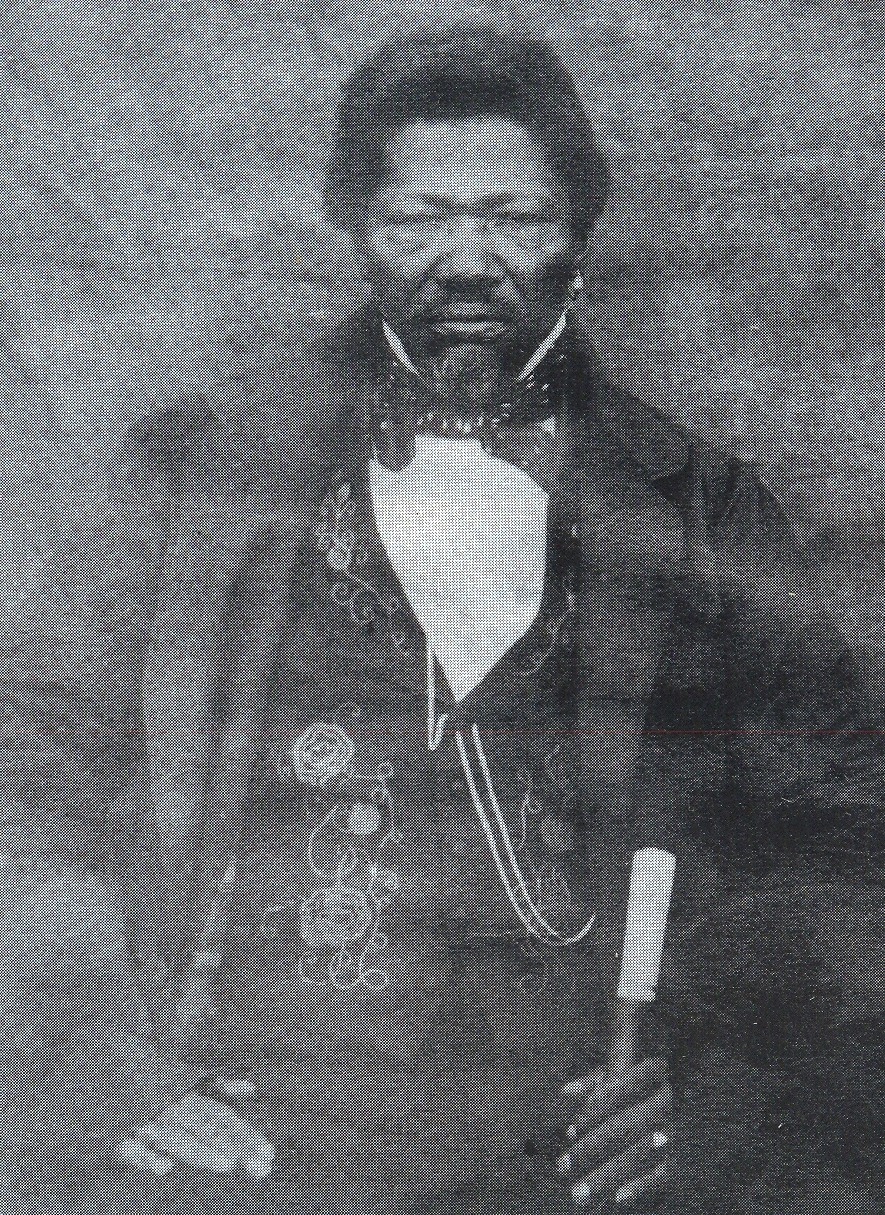
The Griqua Kaptijn (leader) Adam Kok III

=== The Griqualand ===
In the 1870s, there were two Griqualands – West and East – both founded by the Griqua people who had moved out of the Cape Colony in the early 19th century due mainly to racial discrimination.

The Griqua, a semi-nomadic nation of mixed Khoi and Boer origins, moved north to lands just north of the Cape, east of southern Bechuanaland, and west of the Orange Free State, being led by Adam Kok I. This new land was established as Griqualand West by Andries Waterboer. When diamonds were discovered in the area, an influx of Whites overwhelmed the Griqua, leading to annexation by the British in 1871, and forcing 2000 Griqua to trek east from 1871 to 1872. Eventually, they established Griqualand East in 1873, only to be annexed the following year by Britain. Griqualand East was positioned between the Cape Colony and Natal on the eastern coast. At this point, the whites considered the Griqua as part of the bigger Coloureds group.

=== Other Political Entities ===
Swaziland, Zululand, Portuguese East Africa, German Southwest Africa, Matabeleland (now Zimbabwe).

== Historical wars ==
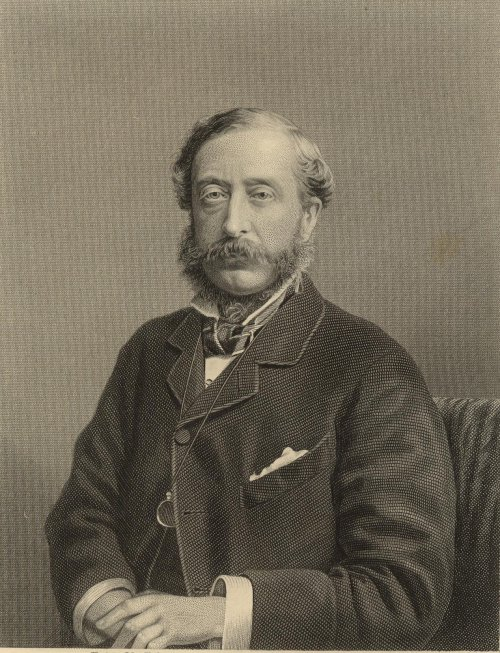
Henry Herbert, 4th Earl of Carnarvon

The first series of wars, the "Confederation Wars" in the late 1870s and early 1880s, were due in large part to the Confederation plan of the British Colonial Secretary, the Earl of Carnarvon, and the disastrous attempts to enforce it. This scheme was intended to forge the diverse states of southern Africa into one single British-controlled federation. This was strongly resisted by the Cape Colony, the Boer republics, and the independent African States. The Anglo-Zulu War and First Anglo-Boer War resulted from these attempts at annexation, while the Gun War and Ngcayechibi's War were caused in part by the imposition of new federation-inspired policies on the Cape and its neighbors.

Exacerbating these conflicts was the effects of the discovery of diamonds around Kimberley and gold in the Transvaal. These led to enormous social upheaval and instability. Crucially, they fueled the rise to power of the ambitious imperialist Cecil Rhodes. When he succeeded in gaining power as the Cape Prime Minister, he instigated a rapid expansion of British influence into the hinterland. In particular, he sought to engineer the conquest of the Transvaal, and although his ill-fated Jameson Raid failed and brought down his government, it led to the Second Anglo-Boer War and British conquest at the turn of the century.

=== Ngcayechibi's War (1877–79) ===
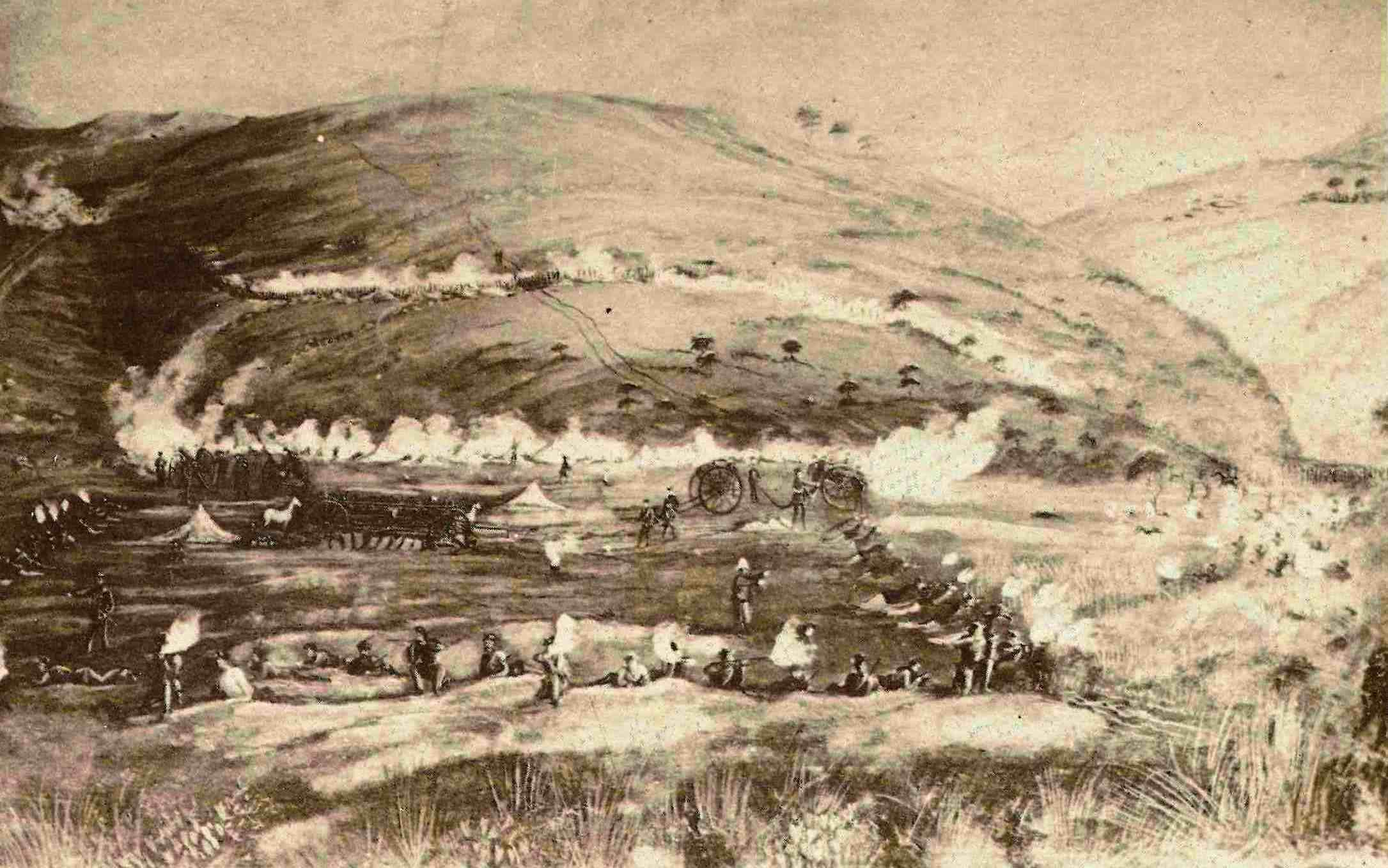
Military engagement near Ibika – 1877

Several factors contributed to the outbreak of Ngcayechibi's War (also known as the "9th Frontier War" or the "Fengu-Gcaleka War"). One was the onset of the worst drought in the region's recorded history, and as the historian de Kiewiet memorably noted: "In South Africa, the heat of drought easily becomes the fever of war." The devastating droughts across the Transkei threatened the relative peace which had prevailed for the previous decade. They started in 1875 in Gcalekaland and spread to other parts of the Transkei and Basutoland, also to the Cape Colony-controlled Ciskei. In 1877 ethnic tensions began to emerge, particularly between the Mfengu, the Thembu, and the Gcaleka Xhosa. Another factor was centuries of oppression and disaffection, brought to a head by the attempt by the new British Colonial Secretary, the Earl of Carnarvon (in office 1866–1867 and 1874–1878), to force the varied states of southern Africa into a British-ruled confederation. This led the British Governor and High Commissioner for Southern Africa, Henry Bartle Frere (in office 1877–1880) to use the outbreak of fighting to overthrow both the Gcaleka Xhosa state (1877–1878) and the Cape Government (February 1878). The outbreak initially involved tensions and violence between Gcaleka Xhosa and Cape Mfengu police. The conflict rapidly escalated when Bartle Frere declared the Xhosa King deposed and resulted in the annexation of the last independent Xhosa state, and the overthrow of the Cape's elected government by the British Governor. The Confederation attempt failed, but the wars resulting from that attempt continued for decades.

=== Anglo-Zulu War (1879) ===
Foreign settlers first came into conflict with the Zulu in the 1830s as they began expanding into Zulu territory. For the majority of the next 40+ years, there was a tentative peace among the British and the Zulu. The Boer/Zulu relationship continued to be one of great friction from the Battle of Blood River in 1838 to Boer incursions and infiltration of land recognized by the British to belong to the Zulu leading into the 1860s. The British supported the Zulu cause against the Boers and supported the Zulu leader Cetshwayo during his coronation in 1873. Cetshwayo assumed this support would continue when the British took control of the Transvaal in 1877. However, the British proved to care more about placating the Boers than they did concerning themselves with the Zulu priorities. When the Zulu began pressuring them, the British under Sir Theophilus Shepstone, the Natal Secretary for Native Affairs, turned against the Zulu and Shepstone began cabling London that Cetshwayo's regime needed to be removed and Zululand annexed.

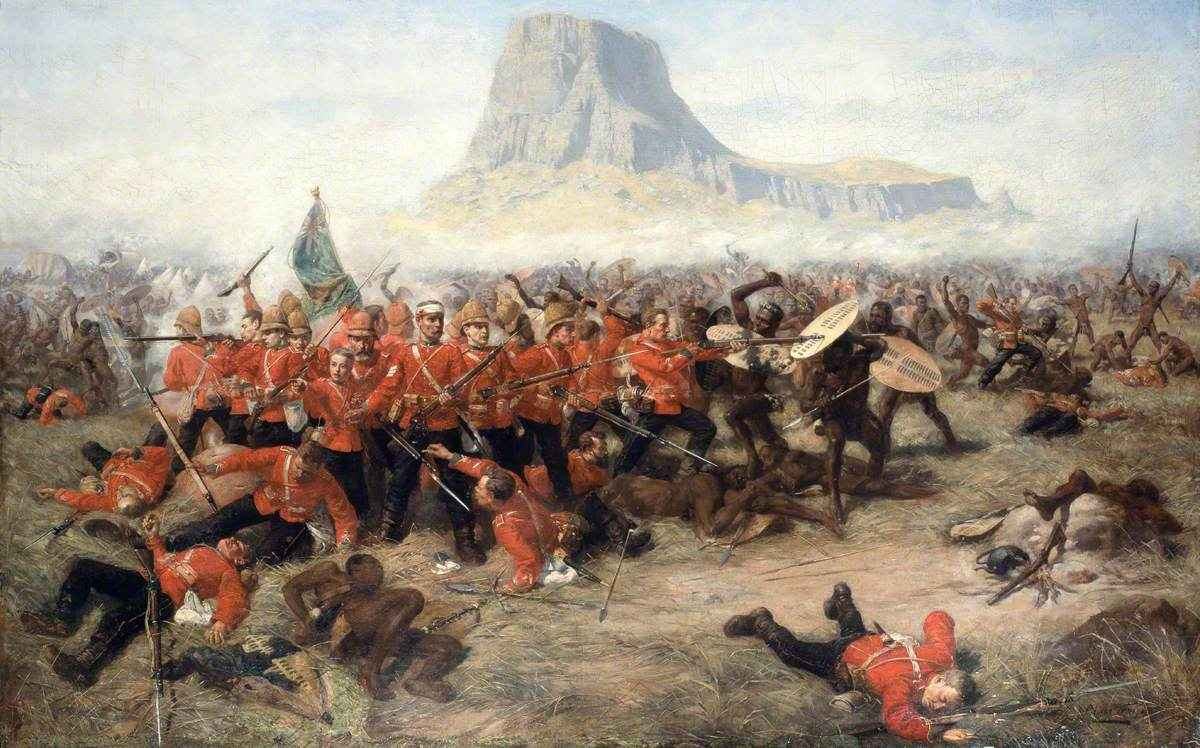
The Last Stand at Isandlwana by Charles Edwin Fripp (1854–1906)

In July 1878, High Commissioner Henry Bartle Frere, using Shepstone's assurance, began claiming that Natal was threatened by a possible Zulu invasion and pushed for war despite London's desire for patience and doing everything to prevent war. The lack of a continuous line of communication from London to South Africa enabled Frere and Shepstone to push their agenda faster than London could react. Frere felt that the technological advantage of Lord Chelmsford's British Army would bring a quick end to the conflict. Frere provoked war with an ultimatum to Cetshwayo that he knew would be unacceptable. He demanded the immediate disbanding of the Zulu army and abolishment of the Zulu military system in 30 days to remove Cetshwayo's base of power. Chelmsford crossed the Blood River on 11 January 1879 with 4,700 men and set up camp at Isandlwana. They neglected any defensive formations around their camp due to Chelmsford's feelings that a Zulu assault was unlikely. He took the main part of his force from camp on 22 January to sweep the countryside, and while he was out, the Zulu surrounded the remaining forces at Isandlwana and slaughtered the majority of the British troops who had remained. It was one of the worst defeats in the history of the British Army.

The shock of the British defeat led to a desire of the British to crush the Zulu and dismantle their nation. After five months of fighting, the British used their technological advantage as a vast force multiplier and destroyed Cetshwayo's last remaining forces at the Battle of Ulundi. The British brought in General Sir Garnet Wolseley as a new proconsul to wrap up the "native problems" surrounding the Boer Transvaal.

=== The First Boer War (1880–1881) ===
The British success in removing much of the "native problem" from the borders of the Boer Transvaal had unintended adverse consequences. The removal of British focus from its Boer issues allowed the Boers to concentrate on the continued British control of the Transvaal. General Wolseley was openly against any notion of Boer independence and issued statements that gatherings in protest of the British rule could lead to prosecution for treason. The Boers continued to push for their independence, to the point that the Boer leader Paul Kruger, who had initially preached caution against rushing to fight, began accepting that war was inevitable.

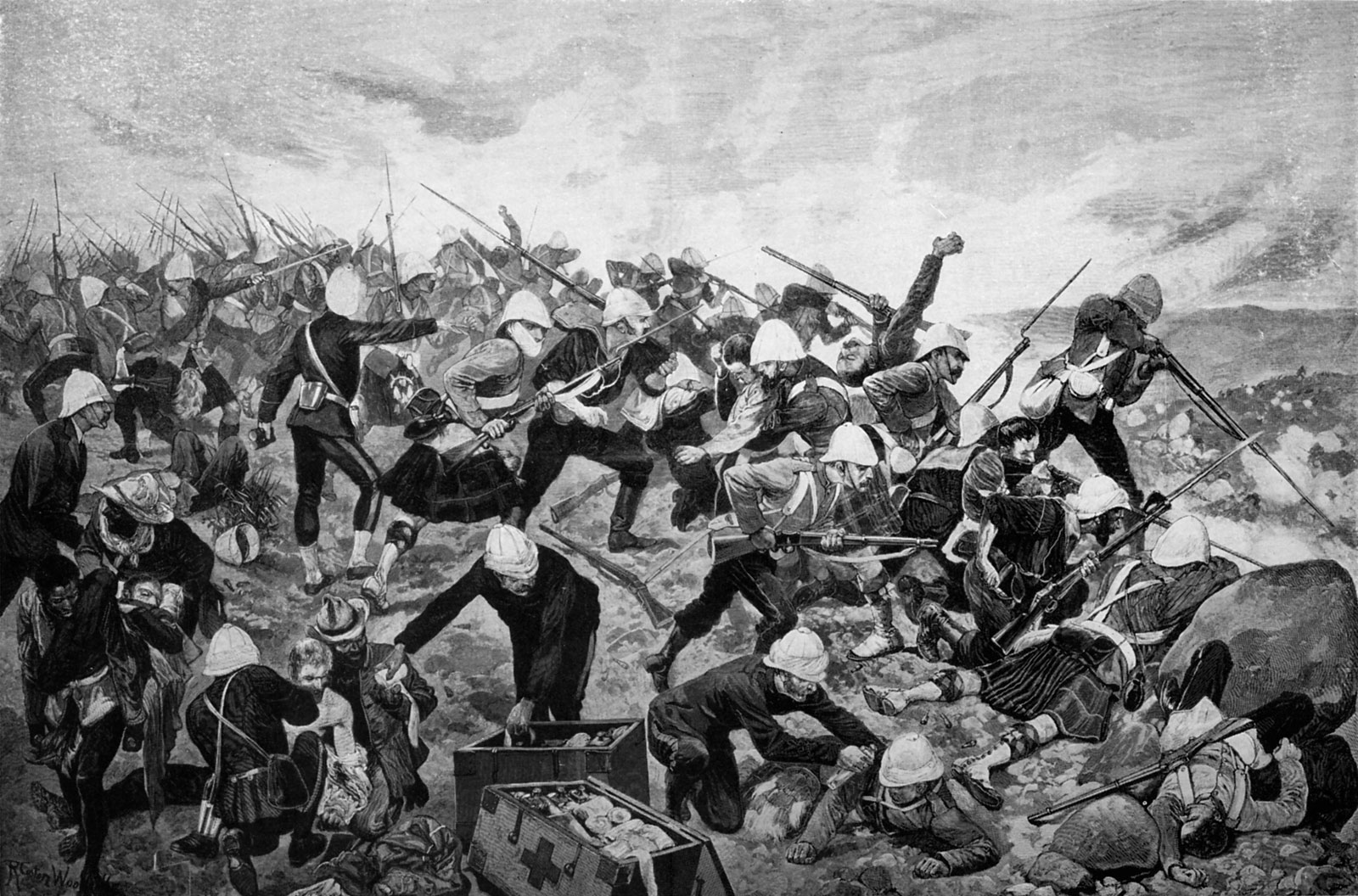
Battle of Majuba Hill, in the First Boer War

Though there were growing signs of conflict, Wolseley recommended the reduction of British garrisons in the region. Continued British indifference to Boer protests and increasing demands placed on the Boers triggered an all-out rebellion in late 1880. The issue that finally brought the conflict to a head was the seizure of a farm wagon over tax dues. The Boers held that the British seizure was illegal because they had never recognized the annexation of the Transvaal. 5,000 Boers assembled at a farm on 8 December and began deliberating a course of action. On 13 December they proclaimed the Transvaal's independence and intent to establish a republican government, raising the Vierkleur, the old republican flag, and beginning the "war of independence." This war had very little in the way of large-scale conflicts. The first was a Boer defeat of a British column that was unprepared for actual conflict. The Boers demanded that the column halt while the British commander, Colonel Philip Anstruther, insisted on continuing to Pretoria. The Boers proceeded to overrun and force the surrender of the column.

The new High Commissioner, General Sir George Pomeroy Colley, assembled units to avenge the British defeat. Colley was short on-field experience and marched against the Boer forces who were laying siege to British garrisons and demanding their surrender. His brash tactics in assaulting the Boers led to the loss of a quarter of his troops in a series of engagements in later January and early February 1881. Colley was determined to redeem himself and led forces, in the Battle of Majuba Hill, to seize the hill despite the chance of an armistice to end the war. He attacked with a small force that did not know about the initial planning, had no proper reconnaissance, and no heavy weapons support. They seized the hill and set up camp without taking the precaution of setting up defensive positions. When the British announced their position, the Boers were initially cowed, but then began covertly scaling the hill from the north, reaching the Highlander lines and attacking. The Highlanders attempted on separate occasions to warn Colley of the attack, but he ignored the reports. Colley was killed in the final assault, as the British lines fractured from a lack of leadership. This defeat shocked the British in South Africa and in the home islands. While many demanded vengeance, the British quietly conducted a settlement that gave the Boers independence with only nominal lip service paid to the authority of the Crown in an effort to allow the British to withdraw "with minimum embarrassment".

=== The Pioneer Column Invasion (1890) ===
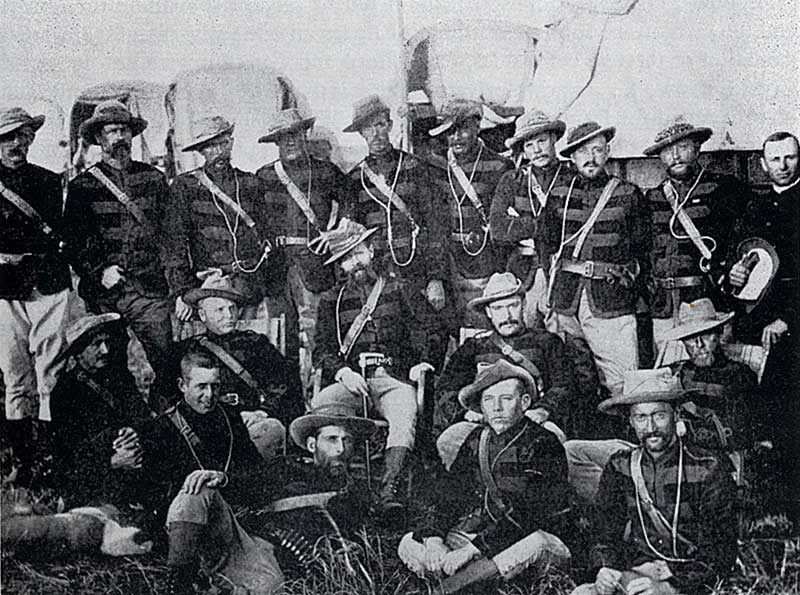
Officers of the Pioneer Corps, c. 1890

The invasion was predicated on the desire of Cecil Rhodes and Britain to pursue further land north through Bechuanaland into Matabeleland. Despite numerous envoys and letters from Queen Victoria to Lobengula, of the Matabele nation, no progress had been made on the opening the "road".

In December 1889, Cecil Rhodes took matters into his own hands by contracting Frank Johnson and Maurice Haney to recruit 500 mercenaries to overthrow Lobengula. Rhodes wanted to strike the main towns and military posts to cause turmoil in the Matabele (or Ndebele) nation. He also wanted to remove the power of the Amandebele to raid nearby villages and wanted to send their state into general confusion. Rhodes believed this would give the British South Africa Company the opportunity to begin mining the land in safety. This plan would never go into effect after Rhodes' discussion with Fred Selous, who warned him that this would be a monumental disaster for traders and England itself.

Rhodes' decision, based on Selous' advice, was to move around Lobengula and make for a different route to Mashonaland from the south around Mount Hampden. Johnson's new mission was to find 120 'miners' to travel with Selous as their guide. The plan was approved at the local level, but once London received the report, the plan was seen as an agitation designed to involve Britain in a war with Lobengula. This led to further negotiations with Lobengula in an attempt to open the "road." Lobengula complained about having to deal with subordinates and told Jameson to have Rhodes brought before him. In a bit of manoeuvring, Jameson told Lobengula that he was going to inform Rhodes of his decision to keep the "road" closed. Lobengula's reply to this was that he had "not refused you the road, but let Rhodes come." Using this and reports that the Boers were making expeditions into Mashonaland, the High Commissioner could not prevent the force from moving into the territory.

Johnson had his "pioneers" at camp, preparing to cross. Rhodes insisted that he take prominent Cape members with him in case they were cut off, his reason being that the Imperial Forces would be more likely to rescue well to-do members of the Cape than miners. While the pioneer column moved out of camp and was preparing to cross, false assurances were being sent to Lobengula about the number of white men in his country. However, Lobengula did not attack and the column, after the 360-mile (580 km) journey, arrived at Mount Hampden on 12 September and named the surrounding area Fort Salisbury.

=== The First Matabele War (1893–1894) ===
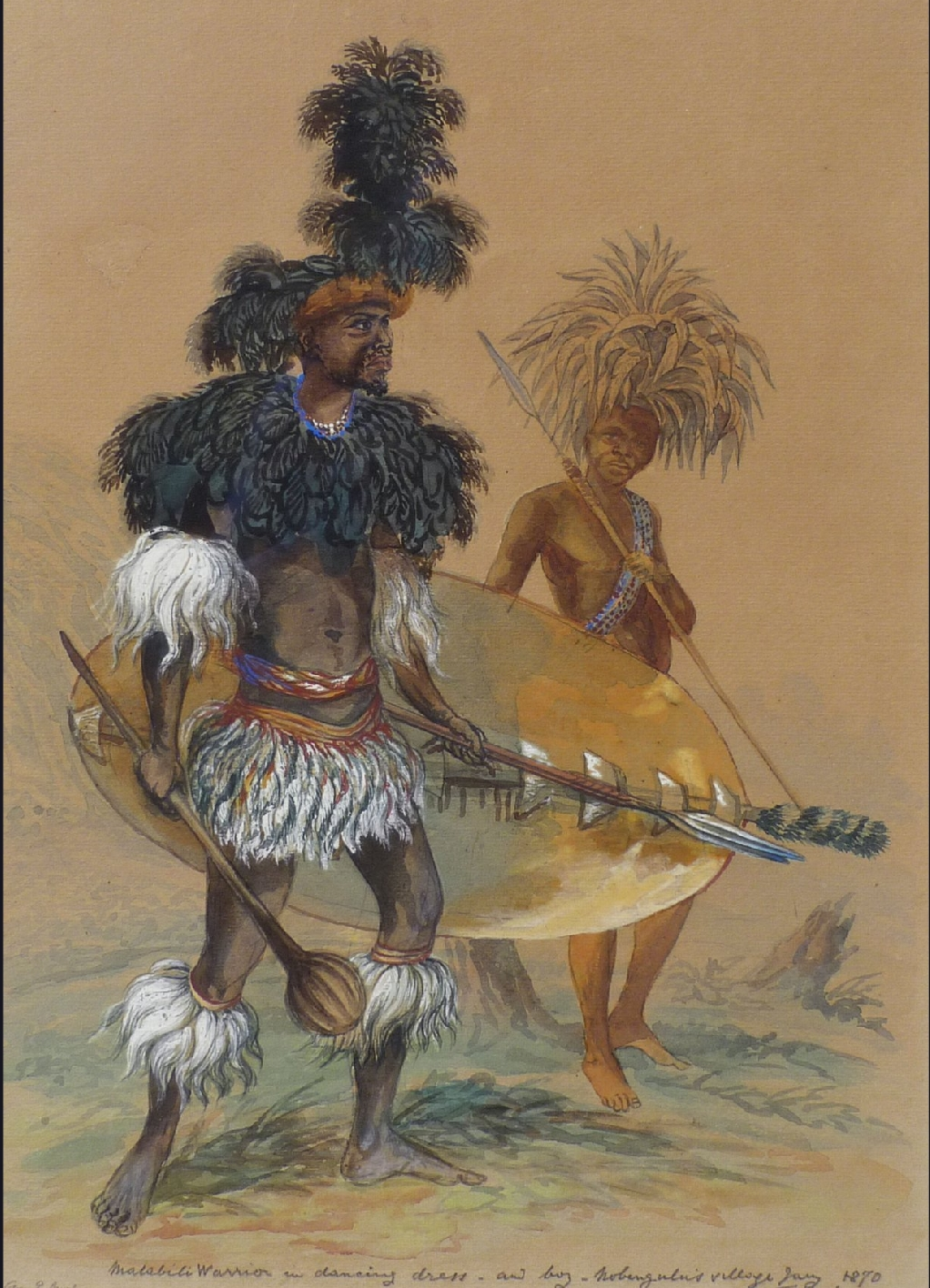
Matebele warrior in ceremonial dress, by Thomas Baines

During the second annual meeting of the South Africa Company, Rhodes stated that the company was on friendly terms with Lobengula, the last king of the Ndebele people, all the while knowing that war was to come. Ultimately, Jameson gave Lobengula's commanders an ultimatum to withdraw from Mashonaland. At the end of his meeting with Lobengula, who refused to move from the border, Jameson sent for Captain Lendy and Boer transport riders to find the Ndebele, and if they refused to leave to move them by force. When confronted, Captain Lendy followed orders and fired upon the Ndebele. After the men returned to Fort Victoria, Jameson sent word to Rhodes and Loch that they must go to war. By October, Jameson had gathered 650 volunteers and 900 Shona auxiliaries. Jameson continued to send word that Lobengula had troops planning to attack. The war was an easy win for Jameson, for as his troops advanced in Matabeleland, they swept over the Ndebele defenders with their machine guns and artillery. Once defeated, Lobengula destroyed his capital and fled to the north. Jameson's advancing troops followed him, reaching Bulawayo on 4 November, but had no luck in finding Lobengula. In a desperate attempt to get away, Lobengula addressed a council of his indunas near the Shangani River and asked that they give all hidden gold to the white men to have peace. Ultimately, the gold was given to men that the messengers came across, and never did reach Jameson or his troops. Matabeleland was ultimately divided among the volunteers and several of Rhodes' officials.

=== Malaboch War (1894) ===
In April 1894, Chief Malaboch (Mmaleboho, Mmaleboxo) of the Bahananwa (Xananwa) people refused to leave his traditional mountain kingdom of Blouberg as ordered by the South African Republic (ZAR) Government as he refused to pay tax. The authorities took action through forced removal, which ultimately resulted in the "Malaboch War", with the chief and his subjects defending their territory. As it became evident that the Bahananwa people were losing the war against the soldiers of Commandant-General Piet Joubert, they began surrendering, and subsequently their chief followed suit, on 31 July 1894, after a siege of more than a month. On the day he was taken prisoner, Chief Malaboch twice attempted suicide by jumping into a fire. He was tried by a council of war on 2 August 1894 and was found guilty on all charges. He was never sentenced but kept prisoner of war until his release by the British authorities in 1900 during the Second Anglo-Boer War. The chief returned to his people and ruled until his death in 1939.

=== The Second Ndebele Matabele War (1896–1897) ===
When Jameson's forces had been defeated by the Boers, the Ndebele saw an opportunity to revolt. In March 1896, the whites were attacked first at outlying farms, mining camps, and stores. As people fled, and when word reached Bulawayo, the capital, people began to panic and rush for arms. Since the Ndebele had first attacked on the outskirts the element of surprise had passed and allowed time for the whites to gather and manoeuvre. As volunteers arrived, Rhodes came from Fort Salisbury and, after naming himself colonel, rode into combat with the troops. In June, it seemed that the Ndebele forces were falling back from Bulawayo to the Mambo Hills, but the whites were surprised once more, for the Shona had joined in the revolt. By the week's end, more than 100 men, women, and children were killed, which was about 10 percent of the white population. Eventually there was a deadlock in the Matopo Hills, and assaults continued until Rhodes sent a captured royal widow, Nyamabezana, to the rebels, stating that if they waved a white flag, it would be a sign for peace, for the cost of the war was becoming too much for the British South Africa Company. Ultimately, Rhodes rode with several others to meet the rebels. After meeting with them and compromising to meet their demands Rhodes met with other Ndebele leaders, and the details of the agreement were finished in October.

=== The Second Boer War (1899–1902) ===
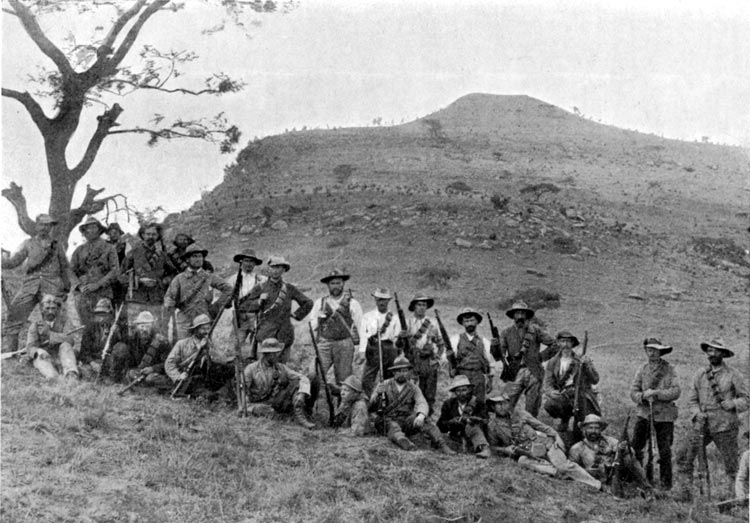
Boer militiamen at Spionkop

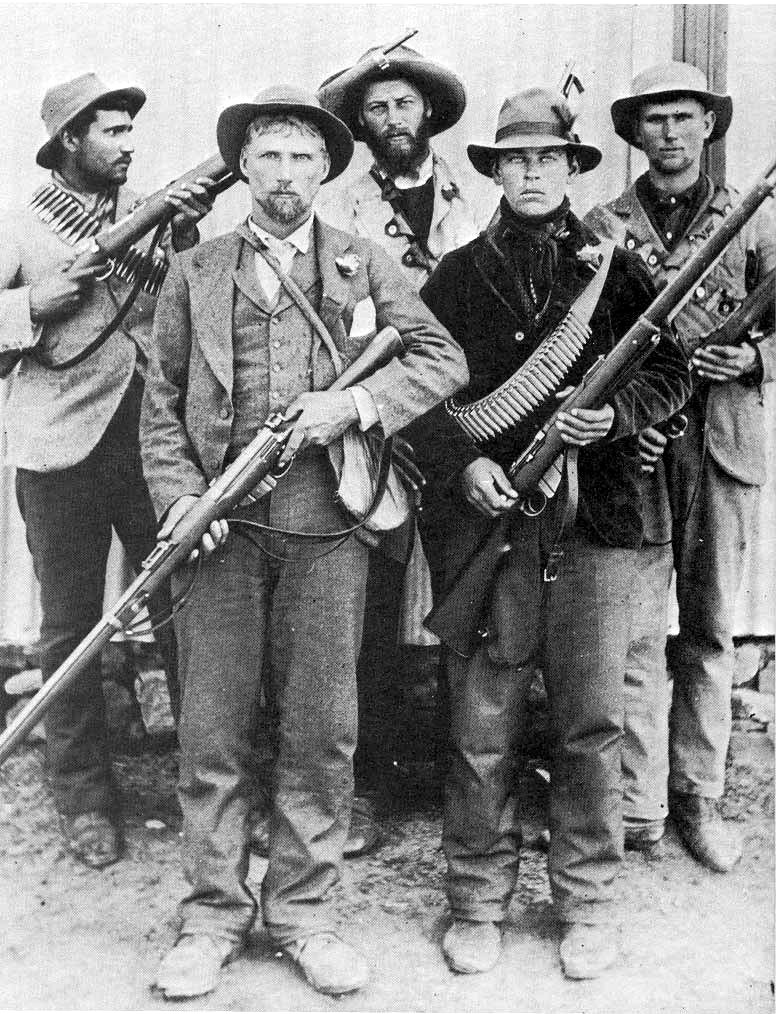
Boer commando

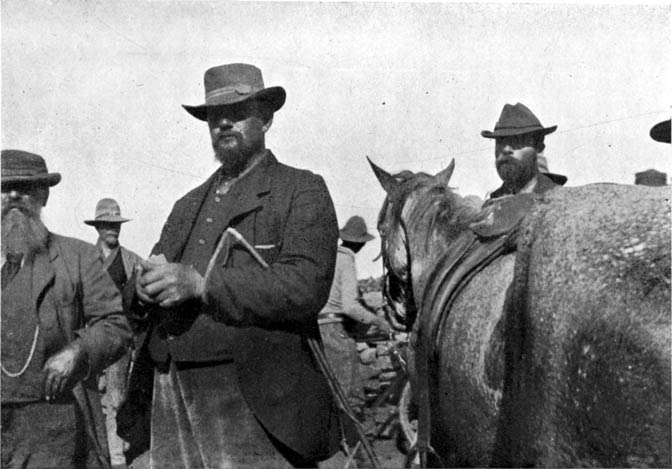
Boer General Peter De Wet, 1900

The exact causes of the Second Anglo-Boer War in 1899 have been disputed ever since the events took place. Fault for the war has been placed on both sides, for different reasons. The Boers felt that the British intention was to again annex the Transvaal. Some feel that the British were coerced into war by the mining magnates; others that the British government manipulated the magnates into creating conditions that allowed the war to ignite. It appears that the British did not begin with the intention of annexation. They simply wanted to ensure that British strength and the regional economic and political stability of the British Empire remained unchanged. The British worried about popular support for the war and wanted to push the Boers to make the first move toward actual hostilities. This occurred when the Transvaal issued an ultimatum on 9 October for the British to withdraw all troops from their borders and recall their reinforcements, or they would "regard the action as a formal declaration of war."

Over time, the war has come to be viewed as a "White Man’s War." Recent scholarship has exposed this as untrue. Black people were used on both sides, primarily in non-combat roles, as labourers. The British employed armed black men as scouts or dispatch riders, and were going to employ unarmed black scouts, but decided to continue arming them when the Boers began shooting at the scouts and dispatch riders as spies. The Boers also employed black men during the war, who mostly helped with digging defensive emplacements and roads for the transport of weaponry. They served in this capacity primarily during the initial conventional phase of the war.

The Second Boer War consisted of three phases. It began with a Boer offensive to besiege the garrisons at Ladysmith, Mafeking, and Kimberley, after a quick mobilisation of their commando units from each district, drawing up to 30–40,000 men. The Boers used a quick-hitting mobile style of war, based on their experiences fighting the British in the first Boer War, along with lessons learned from studying the American Civil War. Early British attempts to relieve these besieged garrisons met with mixed results. The British felt that the war would be ended quickly. They were ill-prepared to face the well-equipped Boers, losing a large number of men in their first attempts to push into places such as Magersfontein, Stormberg, and Colenso.

The second phase began with Britain re-elling from defeats and deploying the largest British force ever sent overseas to South Africa. The British commander, Sir Redvers Buller, and his subordinate Major General Charles Warren, began the British offensive with an attack on the hill of Spion Kop. While the British won this battle, they belatedly realised that the hill was over-watched by Boer gun emplacements and suffered heavy casualties. Buller suffered another defeat at Vaal Krantz and was relieved as commander of British forces over questions of his management of the war. His replacement was Field Marshal Lord Frederick Roberts. Roberts won a series of battles by committing overwhelming numbers of British forces against the Boers. He pushed into and captured the Orange Free State in May 1900 and then pushed into the Transvaal to capture Johannesburg on 31 May. Roberts declared the war over after the capture of the Orange Free State and Johannesburg, announcing the formation of the Transvaal Colony and the Orange River Colony, incorporated in 1902. It was at this point that the Boers, initially demoralised by the overwhelming numbers of British troops, began the third phase of the Second Boer War: the guerrilla campaign.

After regrouping into smaller units, the Boer commanders started using guerrilla tactics, destroying railways, bridges, and telegraph wires. Their leaders included Louis Botha in the eastern Transvaal; Koos de la Rey and Jan Smuts in western Transvaal; and Christian de Wet in the Orange Free State. The British were not prepared for this type of tactic, having an insufficient number of mounted troops and no intelligence personnel. They moved against the civilian population that supported the Boers, burning their houses and barns. Nonetheless, support for the Boers remained strong. To deal with families wandering across the countryside without shelter, the British decided to set up what they considered to be refugee camps, in September 1900. In December 1900 Herbert Kitchener of Khartoum took over command of the British army, continuing the scorched-earth policy. He believed that women served as a source of intelligence for the Boers, so he put them in concentration camps. Additionally, he set up blockhouses and barbed wire fences to restrict the Boers to a certain area. In January 1901, Kitchener raided the countryside, putting Africans and Boer civilians into concentration camps. When he learned that Louis Botha was interested in peace, he jumped at the opportunity, using Botha's wife and an intermediary. Nothing came of the talks, for Sir Alfred Milner insisted that nothing but full surrender would be acceptable to the British. The Boers wanted independence, and in June 1901, Boer leaders came together and stated that no proposal would be considered unless it included their independence. Conditions in the concentration camps worsened, and the problem was not brought to public attention until an Englishwoman Emily Hobhouse did her own investigation and sailed back to England with the intention of exposing Kitchener for what he was permitting. The war minister, Brodick, dismissed the complaints of Hobhouse and her supporters in parliament, stating that it was Boer guerrilla tactics that had led to the methods currently in use. The military situation for the troops of De Wet, Botha, and De la Rey had worsened, for Kitchener's blockhouses and fences were posing a serious problem. Additionally, three-quarters of the Boer's cattle had been killed and taken away and they were struggling just to survive. Though De la Rey (in March 1902) captured General Lord Paul Methuen and 600 troops, he had to let them go because he had no place to keep them. At this time there were many that decided that it would be best to simply accept British rule, some of them serving as guides. These "joiners," as they were called, disagreed with those Boers who continued fighting at great risk, though they knew there would never be a military success.

By this time Kitchener had built an army of 250,000 troops, built 8000 blockhouses, and had 3,700 miles (6,000 km) of commandos (???). He also changed his tactics towards women and children. Rather than packing them off to concentration camps, he told his troops to leave them where they found them, so that the burden of taking care of them fell on the Boers. This further pushed the Boers towards negotiations.

Negotiations for ending the war began in April 1902. Proposals were sent back and forth and rejected by both sides as being unreasonable. At times it looked as if the negotiations would fail, and the war would continue. The Boers were granted some concessions on the treatment of Cape Afrikaner rebels and the rights of the black Africans. Perhaps the most surprising thing to come out of the negotiations was that the Transvaal and Orange Free State would have to recognize King Edward VII as sovereign over their land. Many of the people of the Orange Free State and Transvaal considered this a betrayal of one of their key tenets for fighting in the first place.

=== The Bambatha Rebellion (1906–1907) ===
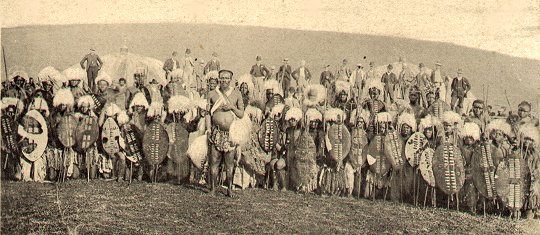
Zulu Warriors in formation

The Rebellion was in reaction to a Poll Tax of £1 on all Native male members over 18 years of age by the Natal House of Assembly. After the magistrate and a small party were threatened by gunshots from Bambata and his followers, the party made their retreat to a small hotel. Joined by the people at the hotel, the magistrate's party proceeded hastily to the police station at Keates Drift.

As news spread to Greytown, a Natal police force was dispatched to deal with the fugitives but saw no sign of the enemy after reaching the Drift. At sunset, the march was continued until they were ambushed at a spot in the Impanza Valley by Bambata's men. After fighting off the enemy and returning to camps with the dead and wounded, more troops were mobilised for an attack on Bambata's location. However, the morning before, he had escaped to Zululand by crossing the Tugela River. The Kranskop reserves trailed Bambata along the same route until they made a wrong turn. They made camp under the Pukunyoni until 28 May 1906, when scouts were shot at by a Zulu impi marching toward the camp. After returning with the news of the approaching Zulu, the camp prepared itself for attack. The Zulu made an initial rush but were turned away. Using a herd of cattle as cover, the Zulu drove the herd through the North-East corner of the camp, with many Zulu being shot only 5 yards (4.6 m) from the defence line. The rest were then driven back or withdrew. The Zulu continued to fire on the camp from a "very bushy" hillside about 300 yards (270 m) away. Several troops were killed and wounded.

The end of the rebellion came when Col. Barker was brought from Johannesburg with 500 soldiers. Along with local troops, they trapped and killed Bambata and the other Zulu chiefs, ending the uprising.

=== The Maritz Rebellion (1914) ===
The Maritz Rebellion (also known as the Boer Revolt or Third Boer War) broke out in South Africa in 1914 at the start of World War I. Men who supported the reinstitution of the old Boer republics rose up against the government of the Union of South Africa. Many members of the government were former Boers who had fought with the Maritz rebels against the British in the Second Anglo-Boer War twelve years earlier. The rebellion was a failure, and the ringleaders were assessed large fines and, in many cases, imprisoned.

Compared to the fate of leading Irish rebels in the 1916 Easter Rising, the leading Boer rebels got off lightly with terms of imprisonment of six and seven years and heavy fines. Two years later, they were released from prison, as Louis Botha recognised the value of reconciliation. After this, the "bitter enders" concentrated on working within the constitutional system and built up the National Party which would come to dominate the politics of South Africa from the late 1940s until the early 1990s, when the apartheid system they had constructed also fell.

=== Walvis Bay (1914–1915) ===
Prior to an attack into South West Africa, the Boers had initially raised their objections to any assault on German forces since the Germans had supported them in the Second Boer War. Martial Law was declared on 14 October 1914, the Boer rebellion was quickly suppressed, and at the outset of World War I, South West Africa (modern Namibia) was under German control after having been passed back and forth during boundary negotiations over the previous years After the Maritz Rebellion was suppressed, the South African army continued their operations into German South-West Africa and conquered it by July 1915 (see the South-West Africa Campaign for details). Troops took much of the territory, including Walvis Bay in the north, in 1915. In early 1915 the South African troops began moving into German South-West Africa. South African forces quickly moved through the country, but the Germans fought until cornered in the extreme north-west before surrendering on 9 July 1915.

== Economics and technology ==
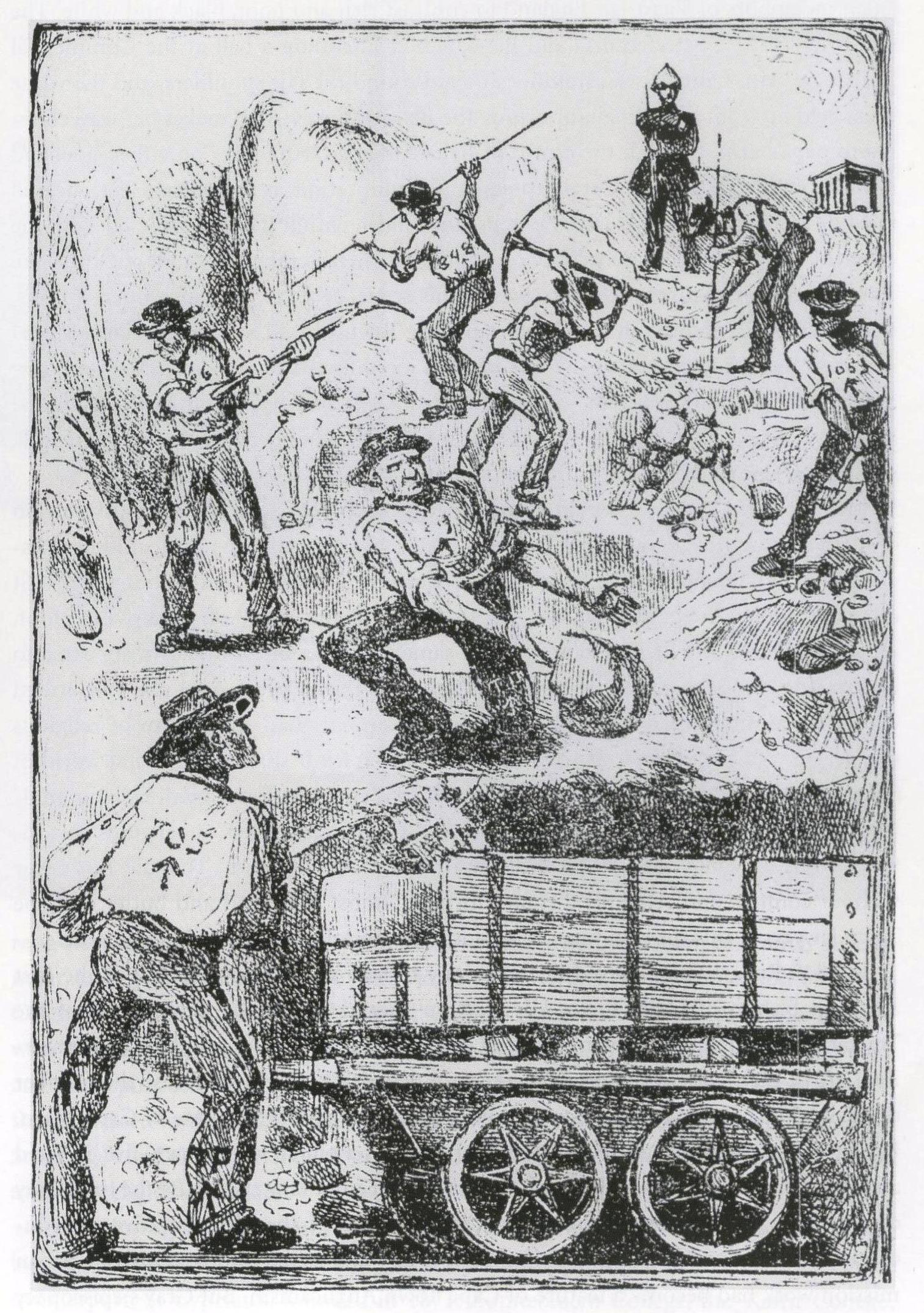
Convict labour in the Cape Colony

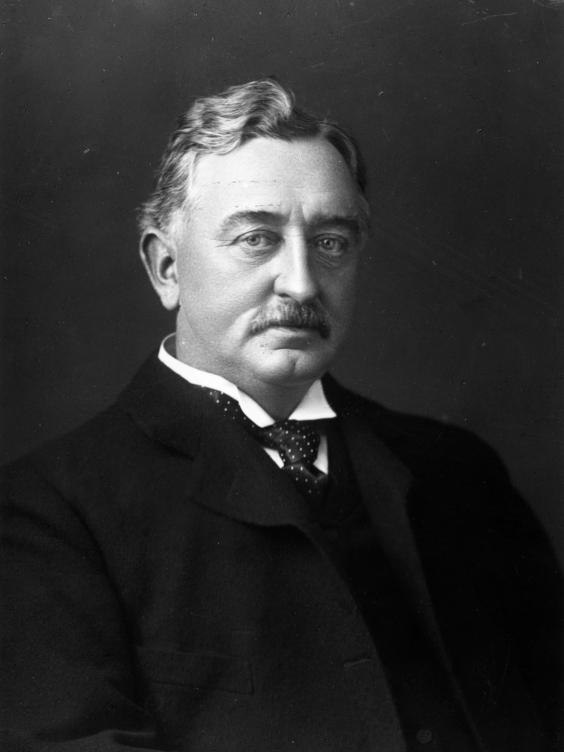
Cecil Rhodes

Technological innovations in southern Africa altered mining, guns, and transportation as well as the course of the war. Mining difficulties helped to create and utilise new technology in the Kimberley mines, where new means of extraction were needed. Originally, numerous small mines created a strange network of larger mining claims. By 1873, Kimberly miners were forced to construct a cable transport system due to several collapses of the roads leading into the mines. The cables in the Kimberly mines were held up by support beams that were placed around the perimeter of the mine. Each level of the mine had two to three platforms. Originally the ropes were made of animal hides or hemp, within a year there was exponential growth of the cable system. The natural materials used for the cables were replaced with wire. After only a year, the mines had grown so elaborate with this system that it inspired awe in people. As mines were dug deeper into the ground, water extraction became a problem. The miners brought in electric pumps to help pump out the water.Cecil Rhodes even started a pumping business during this time. The growth in the mines allowed large business owners to take control of the mines.

One of the major players in the South African economy was Cecil Rhodes. Rhodes helped to create the British South Africa Company as well as De Beers Mining Corporation. Rhodes used his power and influences through these companies to promote the expansion of the British Empire as well as his own business interests. Expansion of the empire was not received well by the non-British parties living in the area. Through economic means, the British attempted to expand their empire into Boer areas which ultimately led to a series of wars in South Africa.

The expansion of British lands led to an interest in gun manufacturing. Gun technology greatly improved during the 1870s. One major creation was the repeating rifle. With these new improvements, companies sent large quantities of older models of guns to Africa to sell for large profits. This influx of guns greatly influenced and helped to escalate the war. Historians estimate that towards the end of the 19th century around 4 million pounds of gunpowder was sold in the German- and British-occupied regions of Africa. Around 1896 the Shona and the Ndbele had around 10,000 guns between the two groups, and by 1879 the Zulu tribes had around 8,000 guns. The Shona were even taught how to manufacture ammunition as well as repair broken or damaged guns. The guns were also used to attract miners because they were sold at and close to mining camps. Sometime in 1890, a blockade would be placed in the importation of guns and ammo in tropical southern Africa. Other forms of technology helped the British Military remain in contact with London.

There were other forms of technology that affected the Cape Colony. The telegraph was important for the movement of communications between Cape Colony and Griqualand West. The 1873 Cape Government Railways plan to connect Kimberley and Cape Town by railway was brought to completion in 1881. Years later, during the Second Anglo-Boer War, these trains would become part of Boer's guerrilla warfare by blowing up trains, lines, and bridges with soldiers on them. They developed new technology to handle the new military tactics. Eventually Hilton a Boer guerrilla leader abandoned the Pretoria Delagoa Bay Railway Line as impossible due to blockhouses, barbed wire, ditches on either side, armoured trains, and frequent checks. Technological developments brought into Cape Colony as a need for them developed.

== Diamond Rush and Gold Rush ==
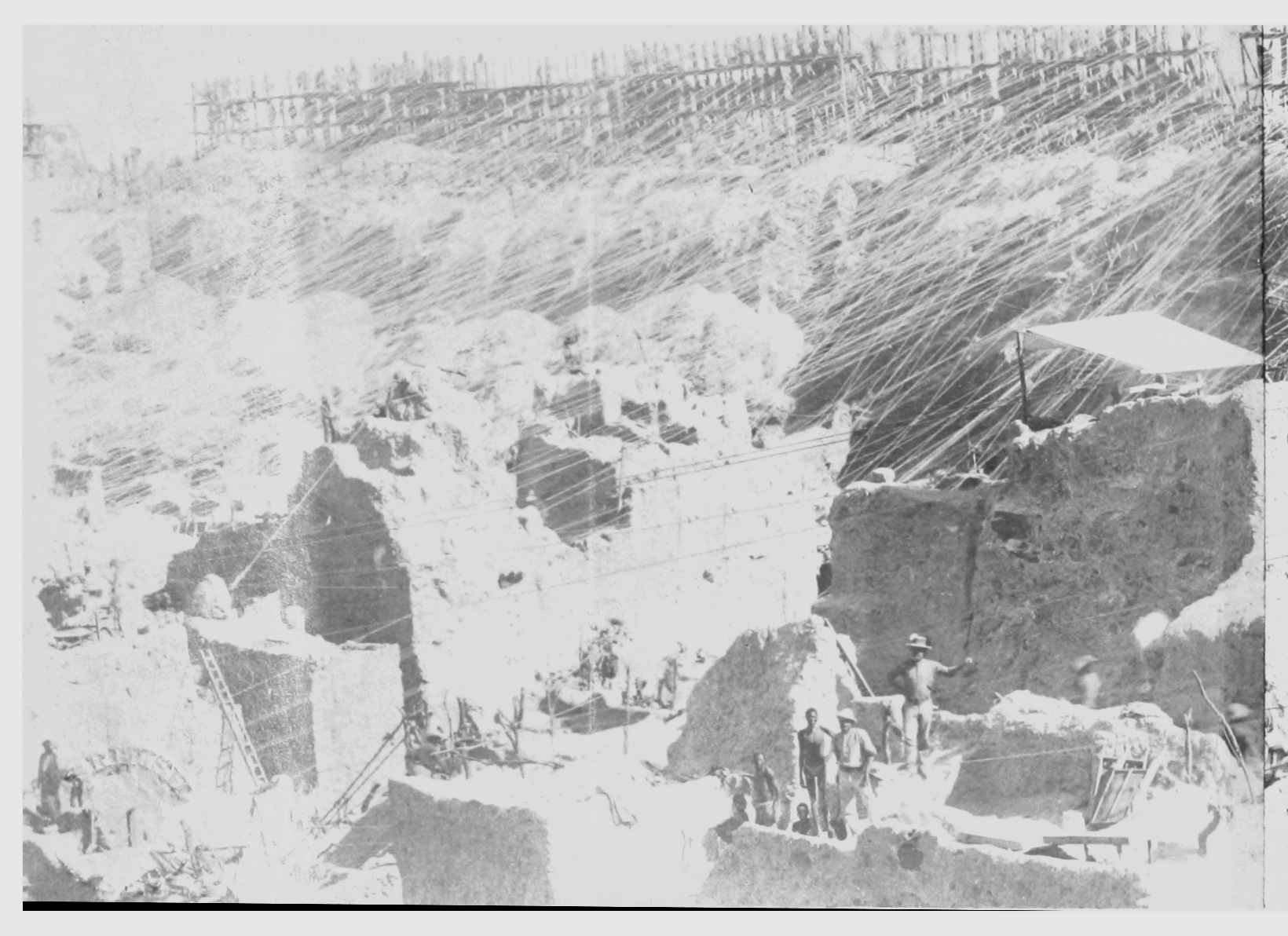
Early photograph of a Kimberley mine

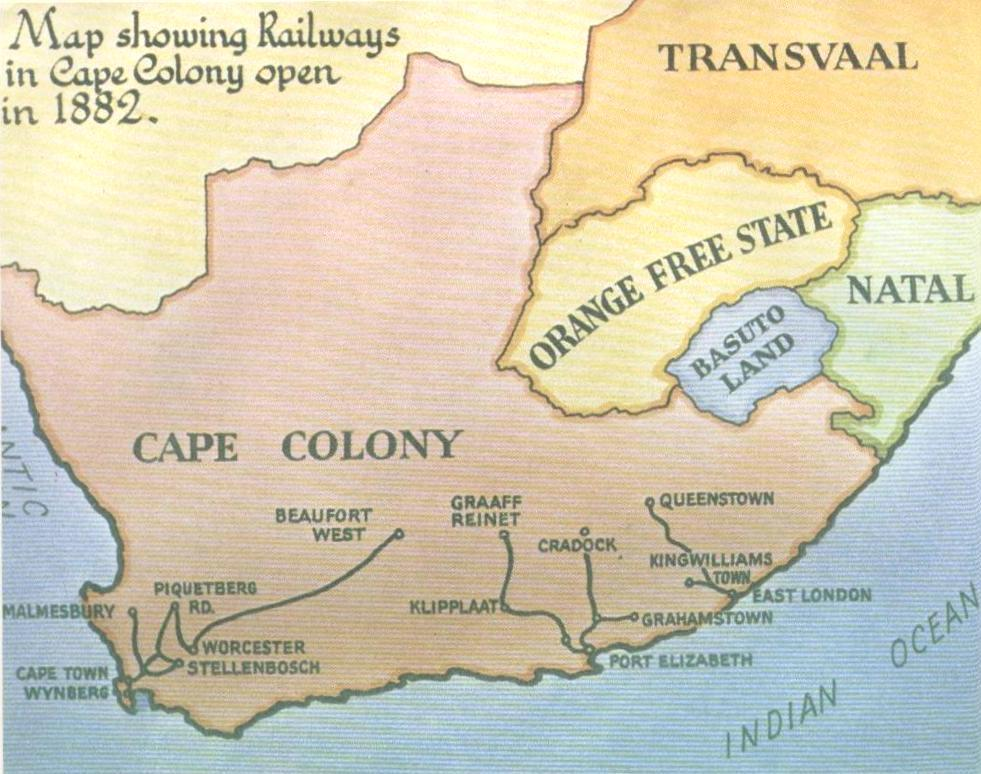
Map of the Cape Government Railways network in 1882.

=== The Diamond Rush ===
A small western area of the Republic of the Orange Free State is home to many of the diamond mines of South Africa. Before the rush to discover diamonds, many of the indigenous people of Africa already used these diamonds as simple tools. John O’Reilly finding diamonds in the 1850s sparked what is known as the diamond rush. By 1869, thousands of people made their way to the Vaal River with the hopes of finding their fortunes. Consequently, mining communities emerged across the region, including Klipdrift, Pniel, Gong Gong, Union Kopje, Colesberg Kopje, Delport's Hope, Blue Jacket, Forlorn Hope, Waldek's Plant, Larkins's Flat, Niekerk's Hope, and many other smaller settlements. The Cape Government formulated plans in 1873, to connect these diamond fields with the three ports of Cape Town, Port Elizabeth and East London. This created the Cape Government Railways.

The later part of the diamond rush took place on a 6,000-acre (24 km^{2}) farm known as Dutoitspan. Due to this discovery, the mining towns of Old De Beers developed as well as Kimberley, which was also known as "New Rush." Kimberley proved to be one of the wealthiest mines on earth. These new mines within the Orange Free State and their great wealth attracted the attention of the British Empire; their new-found interest eventually led to a heated debate between the Orange Free State, the Griqua leaders, and the British Government.

In 1871, the discovery of diamond deposits by prospectors in Griqualand led to a struggle for control between Britain, the Orange Free State, the Griqua state and the Transvaal. A Griqua chief claimed the land that the mines were located on belonged to him and asked for the protection of the British Government. This action resulted in the British annexation the region which became known as Griqualand West. This land was originally given to the Orange Free State by the British in 1854. The Orange State was pressurised by the Earl of Carnarvon to become part of the plan to confederate the countries of Southern Africa under British rule, but it refused. Eventually, the Orange Free State was compensated by payment of $525,000 and although it joined in some of the meetings about confederation, it still rejected the plan. In 1880, Griqualand West was handed by the British to the Cape Colony, within which it became a separate province. This allowed for Cecil Rhodes' entrance into Cape Colony politics to further his agenda as one of the mining magnates when he stood for election to parliament in Barkly West.

=== The Gold Rush ===
In 1886, George Harrison discovered gold in Witwatersrand, in the Transvaal, which led to a stampede of gold diggers from Australia, California, London, Ireland and Germany. The influx of gold diggers created a stream of wealth pouring into the previously poverty-stricken region. However, severe health problems caused by dust from the dry diggings and unsanitary conditions also appeared in dig sites, along with other types of diseases, death and crime. The industry, characterised as monopolistic and political, would be at the center of controversies, such as the conflicts of the Jameson Raid of 1895 and Anglo-Boer war in 1899, for the region.

=== Social effects ===
With the discovery of diamonds in Griqualand West, gold in Witwatersrand and also coal in the Transvaal, the capacity of production changed the political and economic structure of South Africa. "The development of industrial capitalism in the region was markedly accelerated, whilst the long era of dispossession of independent African chiefdoms was finally completed, paving the way for the mobilisation of large numbers of African labourers to provide cheap labour for this industrial revolution".

== Government and politics ==
The main concerns of British policy in southern Africa were economical administration. The British decided to take control of the Cape Colony (1806), as a temporary measure against the French, to protect the trade route between Europe and Asia.

It was only decades later, in 1871, that the British took control of the separate state of Griqualand West. As time progressed, British policies in the Griqualand West Colony, such as Proclamation 14 and the Black Flag Revolt caused tension between the British Cape Colony leaders and the Southern Africa groups such as the Boers. Similar effects resulted later from the Franchise Dispute in the Transvaal.

=== Proclamation 14 ===
Griqualand West, after the diamond rush, had been dominated by the overwhelming influx of settlers, and saw severe discriminatory laws arise already under the independent "Diggers Republic" of Stafford Parker (1870–71) and direct British rule (1871–1880). Proclamation 14 August 1872 was a decree by British Imperial officials to pacify the Kimberly diggers and control black labour. It stated that "servant" could be black or white but that all blacks must carry a pass with them all times to cross the Kimberly pass point. These could be day passes to find employment or work passes (labor contracts). The labour contract would be signed by the "master" and had to show the black worker's name, wage and length of employment. These contracts had to be carried on their persons at all times or they could face imprisonment, fines or a flogging. Colonial officials did excuse some blacks from this requirement if they deemed them "civilized".

=== Black Flag Revolt ===
"The Black Flag Revolt" in 1875 was between the white diggers and the British colonial government of Griqualand West. The British official administering the Griqualand West Colony was Sir Richard Southey, who wished to curb the independence of the diggers. The revolt was led by Alfred Aylward. Other major players in the revolt were William Ling, Henry Tucker and Conrad von Schlickmann. The diggers were upset about high taxes, increased rent and colored unrest. Aylward was pushing for a Republican form of government and preached of revolution. He formed the Defense League and Protection Association which pledged action against taxation. Aylward inspired the diggers to take up arms in March and formed the Diggers' Protection Association that was paramilitary. A black flag was the signal for Aylward's supporters to revolt. William Cowie, a hotel owner, was arrested without bail for selling guns to Aylward without a permit. Aylward mounted the "black flag", the signal to revolt, in response to Cowies' arrest. The rebels blocked the prison upon the arrival of Cowie led by Police escort. Cowie was eventually acquitted. Southey asked for British troops to be sent to help control the situation. Volunteers from the Cape also assembled to assist. The rebels held control of the streets for ten weeks. They surrendered upon the arrival of the British Red Coats on 30 June 1875. The rebel leaders were arrested and put on trial but were found not guilty by a jury of their peers. London was not happy with the way that Southey had handled the situation and the costs of sending troops, and he was removed from his position. The significance of the "Black Flag Revolt" was a victory for white interests, the end to independent diggers and signaled the rise of diamond magnates.

Proclamation 14 and The Black Flag Revolt greatly increased hostility between Southern Africa's native inhabitants and the British leaders.

=== Swaziland ===
Swaziland had preserved its existence even while around its other native tribes had fallen one by one. Swaziland was promised independence by both the Transvaal as well as Britain with respective treaties. All this changed following the discovery of gold in the De Kaap Valley in 1884.

The Swazias had historically assisted the Europeans and played a role in both Boer and British conflicts against their enemies the Pedi and the Zulu. Boer farmers gained grazing concessions, followed by mining rights. To deal with the growing demand for concessions from white settlers, the Swazi Chief Mbanzeni employed Offy Shepstone of Natal to run the concession administration. Upon his arrival Shepstone formed the white governing committee to oversee taxes and law enforcement on the white settlers. Shepstone soon proved to be corrupt, and concessions were being sold off at an alarming rate. Soon The Transvaal had acquired railway, telegraph and electricity concessions. In an attempt to slow down the concessions Mbanzeni gave the White Governing Committee authority over all whites in Swaziland. This proved disastrous and the rapid selling off of Swaziland continued.

On 3 May 1889 Krueger informed the British he would forego all claims to the North if he could obtain political rights to Swaziland. The White Governing Committee agreed to the deal and Mbanzenis country was sold out from under him. Following the death of Mbanzeni the Transvaal and Britain divided up the remaining territory until sole control fell to the Transvaal in 1894.

=== The Franchise Dispute ===
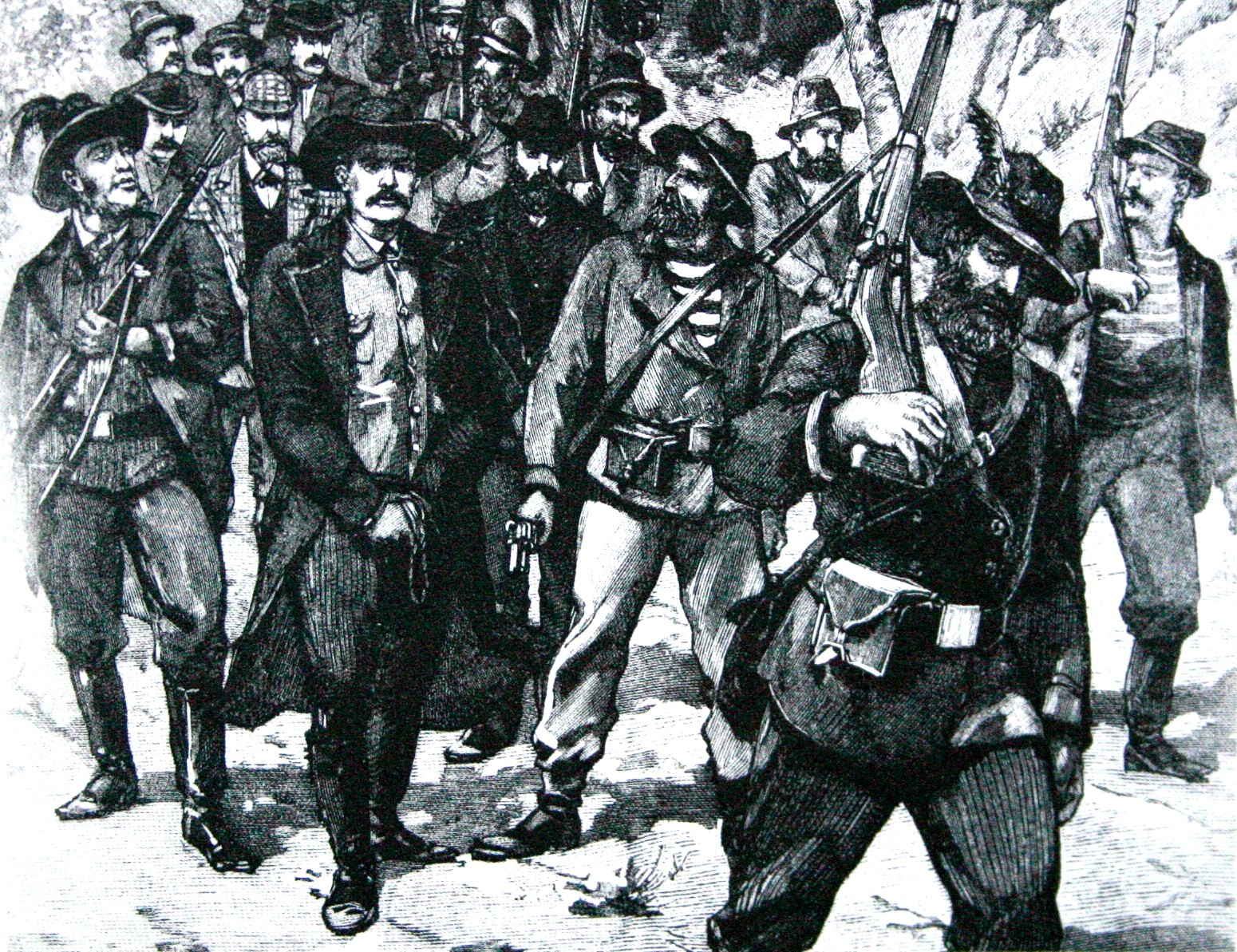
The Boers defeat the "Jameson raid" – Petit Parisien 1896

With the influx of foreign workers into the Transvaal following the discovery of gold in Witwatersrand, the dispute over foreigners rights became a major problem for the Kruger government. Originally after residing in the Transvaal for one year foreigners were given the right to vote. In 1882 to counteract the increasing foreign population, the requirement was raised to five years as well as a twenty-five pound fee. Following the establishment of the Second Volksraad in 1891 the requirements were again raised, this time to fourteen years and requiring voters to be over the age of forty. However, to vote in the newly established Second Volksraad residents needed only to reside in the Republic for two years and pay a five-pound fee. This Second Volksraad however would be over-ruled by the First. This essentially created a dual class society.

During the tense times following the Jameson Raid the franchise dispute was at the center of talks looking to avoid war. During talks in Bloemfontein between Kruger and Sir Alfred Milner in 1899, Milner suggested giving full franchise to every foreigner who had resided in the Transvaal for five years as well as seven new seats in the Volksraad. With the foreign population being significantly larger than that of the Boers, Kruger believed this would essentially mean the end of The Transvaal Republic as an Afrikaner state.

Kruger countered with a "sliding scale" offer. Uitlanders who had settled before 1890 could obtain franchise after two years, settlers of two or more years could apply after five years and all others after seven years. This proposal would also include five more seats in the Volksraad. Milners ultimate desire however was immediate franchise for a significant proportion of Uitlanders so to better British interests in the Transvaal. A wire to Milner to accept the terms arrived too late and the proceedings were cancelled without a resolution.

In a final attempt to avoid war Kruger proposed enfranchisement to any foreigner who had lived in the Transvaal for five years as well as ten new seats in the Volksraad, in return Britain would have to drop any claim at all to the Transvaal as well as no longer take interest in the republic's internal affairs. The British government sent a letter to Kruger accepting the franchise concessions but refusing the other aspects of the deal. Failure to resolve these issues was one of the main causes of the Second Boer War.

== Belligerent forces ==
Many ethnic groups participated in the South African Wars from 1879 to 1915. These groups included colonial settlers such as the British and the Boers as well as indigenous tribes and clans.

=== Boers ===
According to the strict corporate hierarchy of the Dutch East India Company, all Europeans in its overseas colonies were considered either Company employees, or "vrijlieden", also known as "vrijburgers" (free citizens). Vrijburgers were often former Company employees who applied for permission to retire in a given territory after completing their service contracts. They had to be Dutch citizens by birth, married, "of good character", and committed to spending at least twenty years in South Africa. Reflecting the multi-national character of the Company workforce, some Germans were open to consideration as well, and in the late 1680s they were joined by over a hundred French Huguenot refugees who had fled to the Netherlands following the Edict of Fontainebleau and had been subsequently resettled by the Dutch at the Cape.

The Company granted the vrijburgers farms of thirteen and a half morgen each, which were tax exempt for twelve years, and loaned each household the necessary implements and seeds. However, the new farmers were also subject to heavy restrictions: they were ordered to focus on cultivating grain, and each year their harvest was to be sold exclusively to Dutch officials at fixed prices. They were forbidden from growing tobacco, producing vegetables for any purpose other than personal consumption, or purchasing cattle from the native tribes at rates which differed from those set by the company. With time, these restrictions and other attempts by the colonial authorities to control the settlers resulted in successive generations of vrijburgers and their descendants becoming increasingly localised in their loyalties and national identity and hostile towards the colonial government.

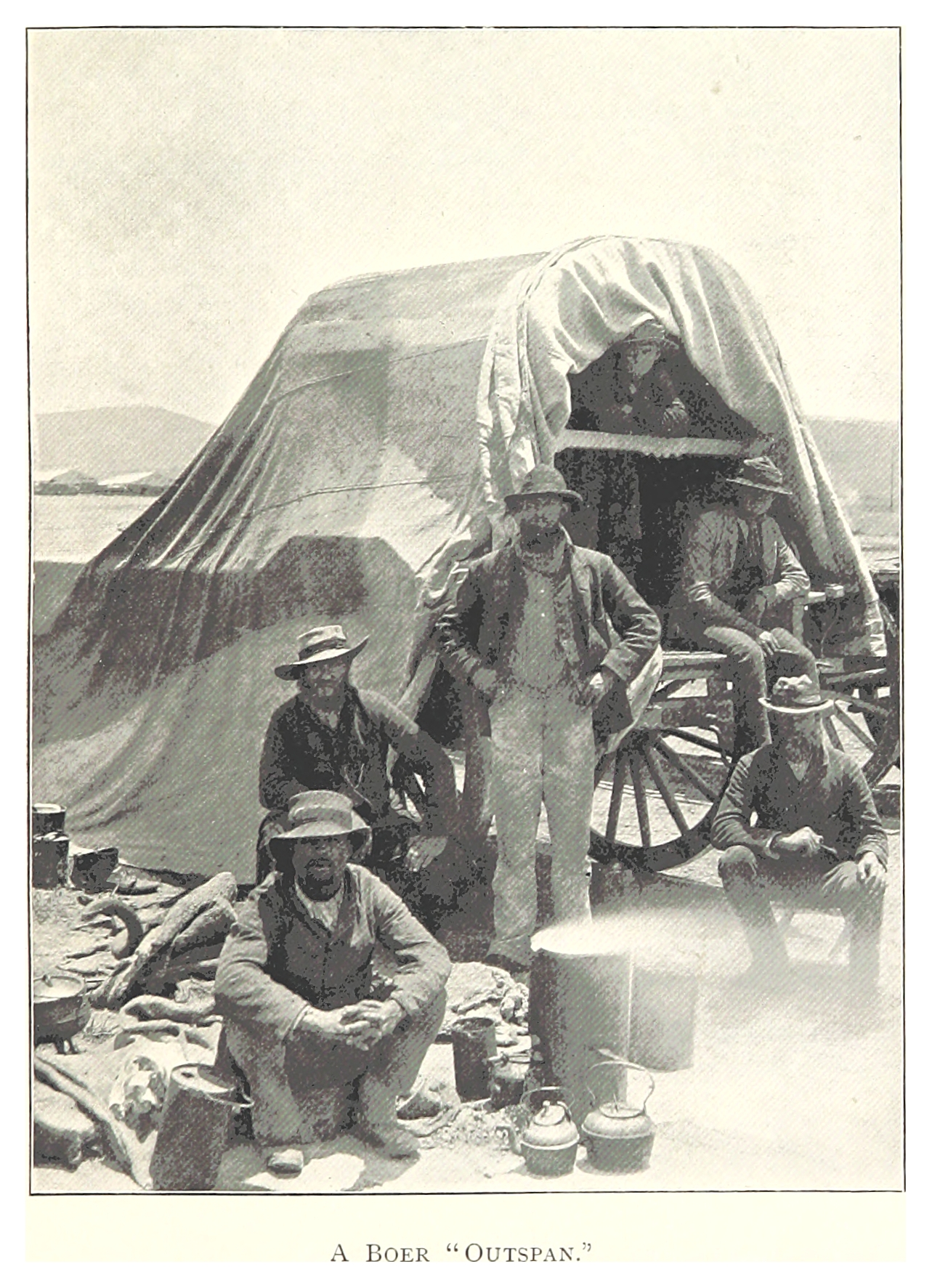
A Boer camp, 1899

Vrijburgers who settled directly on the frontiers of the Dutch Cape Colony, known as Boers, became fiercely independent; they pushed beyond the colony's borders and had soon penetrated almost a thousand kilometres inland. A few adopted nomadic lifestyles permanently and were known as trekboers. The Boer expansion was driven by the constant search for fresh pasture and a desire to rid themselves of petty Dutch administrators. In 1769 the Boers encountered a southwards migration of the Xhosa people, sparking a violent competition between both groups for land in the vicinity of the Great Fish River.

The Boers pursued an even less amiable relationship with the British colonial government than they did with the Dutch. Between 1828 and 1834 the British set up a new court system in the colony, replacing Dutch with English as the official language, despite the fact that the majority of the settlers only spoke Dutch. In 1815, a controversial decision by the Cape authorities to arrest a Boer for assaulting his native servant produced a minor revolt known as the Slachter's Nek Rebellion. This, coupled with other grievances such as the abolition of slavery in 1834 and the imposition of new taxation and legislative controls, led thousands of Boers to undertake the Great Trek and found their own Boer republics inland. Despite the distance covered by the itinerant Boers, known as voortrekkers, British attempts to re-assert control over them continued during the Great Trek . This resulted in the first British annexation of a Boer state, the Natalia Republic, in 1843, and subsequently of two others, the South African Republic (also known as the Transvaal) and the Orange Free State. Boer attempts to defend the sovereignty of their short-lived republics resulted in the First and Second Anglo-Boer Wars.

During World War I, embittered former Boer partisans launched an unsuccessful attempt to reestablish the Boer republics in the newly independent Union of South Africa, which had been granted dominion status within the British Commonwealth. This incident was widely denoted as the Maritz Rebellion.

=== Zulu ===
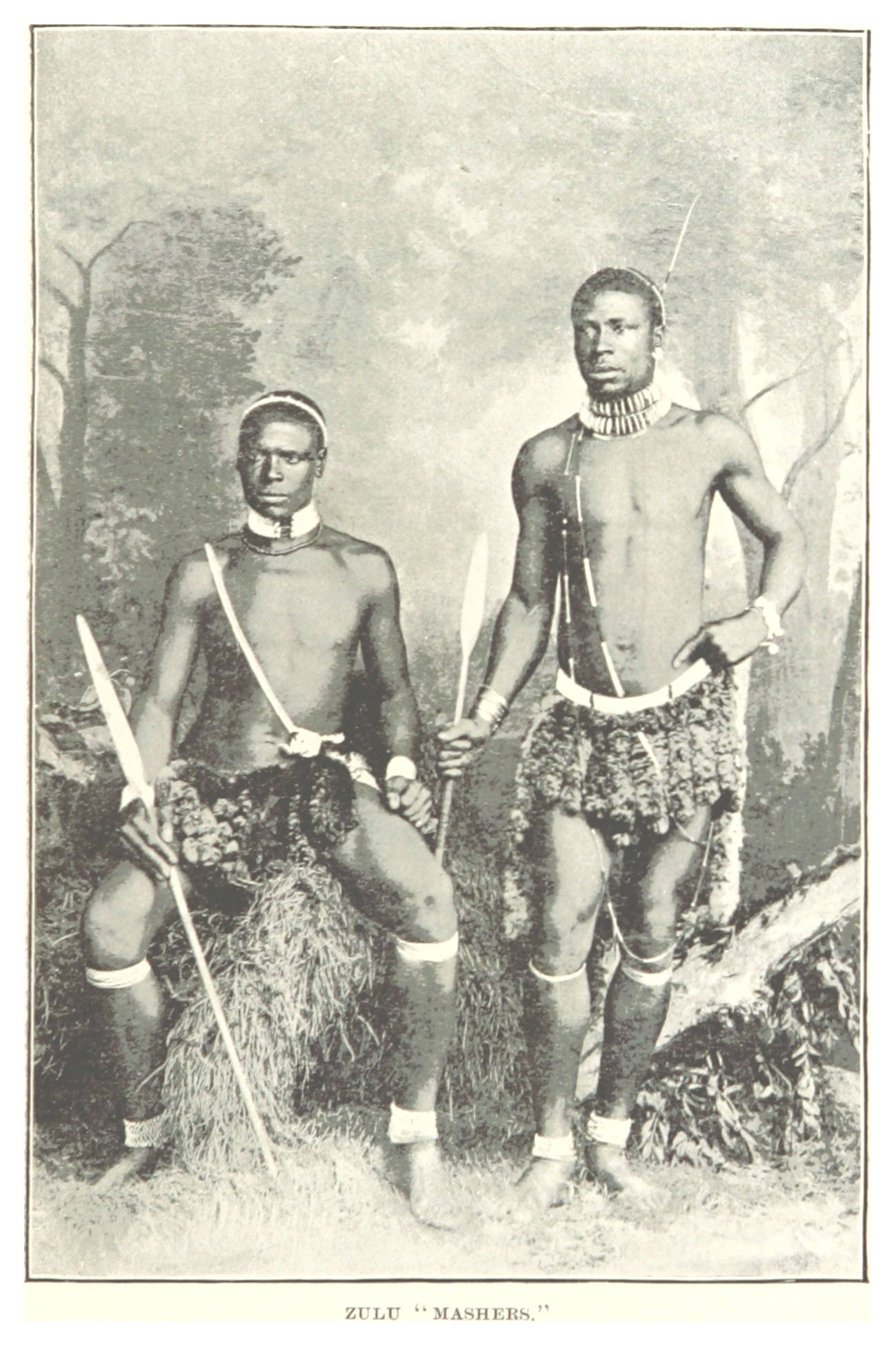
Zulu men in traditional clothing

The Zulu originated from the Nguni clans which moved down the east African coast during the Bantu migrations. The Zulu tribe traditionally resided in the Natal province on the eastern side of South Africa. The Zulu were involved in two major wars. They fought against the British colonials in the Anglo-Zulu War in 1879. The Zulu were eventually overpowered by superior British technology. The Anglo-Zulu war resulted in the absorption of traditional Zululand into the British Cape Colony. The second conflict also involved Zulu and British colonials. Bambatha, a leader of the Zondi clan led a rebellion against British authority in the Natal province. The rebellion was suppressed by British colonial forces.

=== Colonial British ===
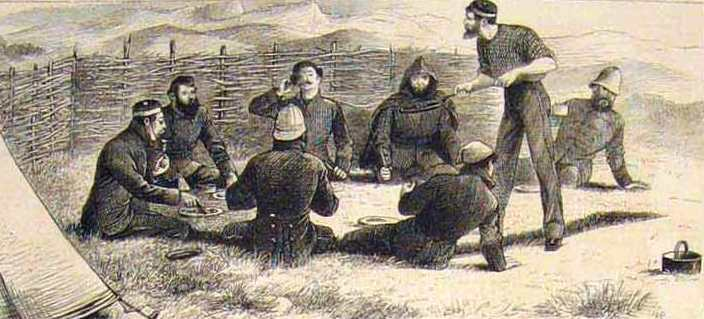
British Cape soldiers at camp in 1878

The British took control of the Cape Colony in 1795. It was first used as a naval port on the way to the more established British colonies of India and Australia. In 1820 the British government relocated a large number of settlers to the new South African colony. The colony now had two distinct groups of European settlers, the British colonials and the Dutch Boers. The British settlers usually resided in the towns and held urban jobs such as in trade and manufacturing. The British colonials experienced conflicts with a militaristic and organised tribe in the Natal Province, the Zulu. There were two major conflicts with these indigenous people, the Anglo-Zulu War and the Bambatha Rebellion. British colonials also had two conflicts concerning the independence of Boer republics. In the First Boer War, the Boers became independent from British colonial control. Later, in the Second Boer War the Boers declared war on the Cape Colony over the placement of British troops. The British colonial forces eventually captured all Boer major cities, and the formerly free South African Republic came under the control of the British. There were several conflicts started by British colonial settlers that the British government and army had to finish. Cecil Rhodes was involved in many of these conflicts including the Jameson Raid and Pioneer Column Invasion. Two conflicts occurred with the Ndebele people or Matabele as the British colonials called them. These were two rebellions against British colonial authority that were quickly suppressed by notable individuals such as Leander Starr Jameson and Colonel Baden-Powell. The British colonials faced another rebellious threat in 1914 when General Maritz and a number of South African forces declared independence from the British. Maritz allied himself with the Germans at the nearby German South-west Africa colony. Walvis Bay was an area first captured by the Germans at the outbreak of World War I. Walvis Bay was later recaptured by British colonials.

=== Ndebele ===
In the 1820s a branch of the Zulu led by Mzilikazi split from the main tribe to form the Ndebele people. Their people moved west from Zululand and settled near present-day Pretoria. They would eventually move slightly north to present day Zimbabwe causing territorial pressure with the Shona people. Conflict with the British colonials erupted in 1893 when their leader deployed warriors to attack and plunder the Shona people living near Fort Victoria. Unintentional confrontation broke out between Ndebele warriors and British soldiers at the fort. Although outnumbered, the British eventually suppressed the Ndebele. A second Ndebele war broke out in 1896 when they rebelled against the authority of the British South Africa Company. This war like the previous one eventually evaporated with the death of the leader insurrection. Even today this war is celebrated as the First War of Independence in Zimbabwe.

=== Xhosa ===
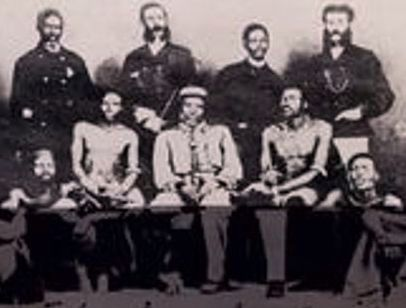
Early image of Xhosa King Sarili (center), seated with diplomats and Councillors in 1871.

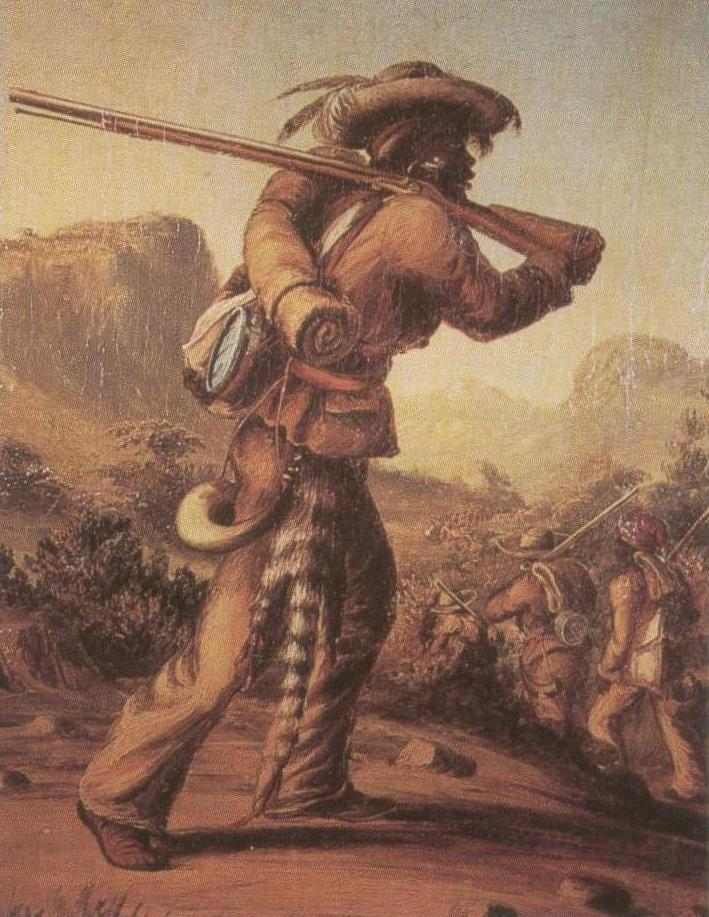
The Fengu people were legendary sharpshooters and essential allies of the Cape Colony. They later assimilated with the Xhosa nation.

The Xhosa people were a group of Bantu-speaking chiefdoms driven out of the Zuurveld grasslands by the British colonists in 1811. In 1819, the Xhosa attacked the frontier village of Graham's Town with 10,000 warriors but were defeated and lost even more land. In 1834, the Xhosa again invaded the colony but were again driven back and lost more land to the British.

These wars between the Xhosa and Dutch and British colonists took place along the east coast of Cape Colony between the Great Fish and Great Kei rivers. In 1811, the British began a policy of clearing the land of Xhosa people to make way for more British colonists. Nearly an entire year of fighting (1818–19) ensued.

Following the battle, around 4000 British colonists migrated to the area along the great Fish River. The further the colonists pushed east, the more resistance they met. Spoils of the war of 1834 to 1835 were 60,000 cattle which the colonists took over. From 1846 to 1853 was a longer struggle. In the war of 1877 to 1879, the colonists took over 15,000 cattle and around 20,000 sheep. In the aftermath, all Xhosa territory was lost to the colonists of the Cape Colony.

== Key figures ==
Throughout the period of the South African Wars, people on both sides of the conflict achieved notability. Some of these people were in favor of the British colonizing South Africa and making it a British territory, while others fought against the British in an attempt to slow down and stop these efforts.

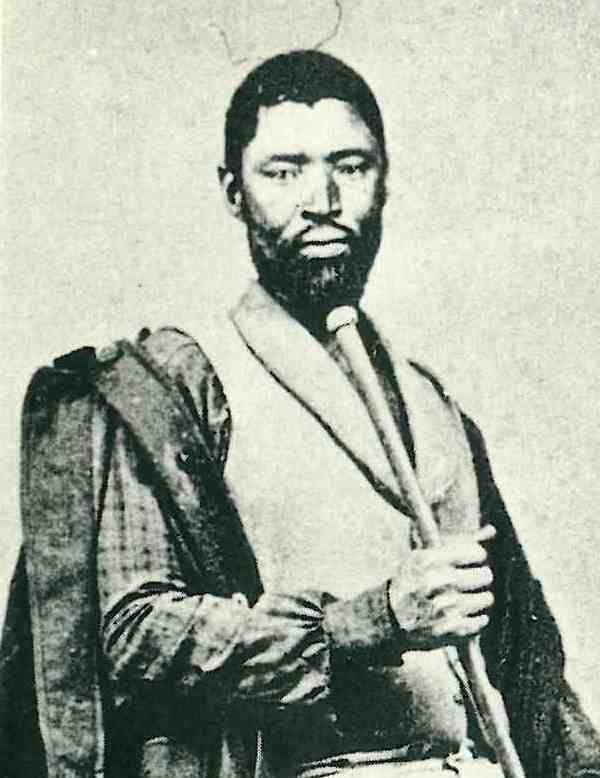
Sandile kaNgqika

Sandile kaNgqika was the dynamic and charismatic chief of the Rharhabe House of the Xhosa Kingdom, who led his army in a string of wars until he was killed by Fengu sharpshooters in 1878. Although he acted independently, he usually recognised the authority of King Sarhili(Kreli) of the Gcaleka, whose country lay to the east and who was nominally the Paramount-Chief of all the Xhosa people. Sandile's soldiers used modern firearms (in addition to their traditional weapons for close combat) and they were skilled in guerrilla warfare. However, his tragic death was a turning point. It brought to a close the last of the Xhosa Wars (1779–1879); and saw the beginning of the greater South African Wars (1879–1915) which now encompassed the whole subcontinent.

The Earl of Carnarvon was the colonial secretary in London from 1874 to 1878. He was greatly concerned with Imperial defence of the Cape and felt that it was a crucial point in the empire's trade and future security. For this reason, he wished to bring all the various states of southern Africa into one single British-controlled Confederation. He had recently confederated Canada, initiating a unified, British-controlled government that meshed two cultures and create a bi-lingual society, and he wished to replicate that success in southern Africa. The South Africa Act 1877 was derived from the British North America Act concerning draft confederation. Carnarvon felt that if it worked for Canada, it could also apply to southern Africa. Many southern African states fiercely resisted this interference in the region. His attempt to enforce this system of confederation onto southern Africa was a primary cause of the first set of the South African Wars.

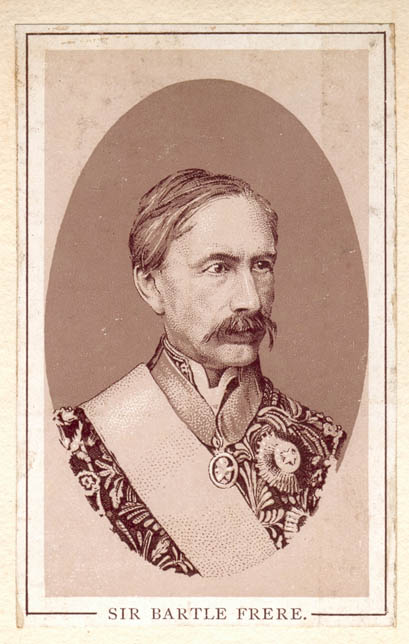
Henry Bartle Frere

Sir Henry Bartle Frere was the new British Governor whom Carnarvon sent out to southern Africa in 1877, to enforce his confederation plan, bring the various states of southern Africa into the united British federation, and preempt what he believed would be a "general and simultaneous rising of Kaffirdom against white civilization". For this purpose, Frere initiated the Anglo-Zulu War, the 9th Frontier War, the Gun War, and overthrew the elected government of the Cape Colony to replace it with the pro-federation Sprigg puppet government. He critically underestimated the Zulu State as "a bunch of savages armed with sticks" and likewise miscalculated in taking on war with the Boers and the Basotho – against all of whom the British suffered serious setbacks and defeats, before sheer force of arms extricated them. Back in London, the new British Government was horrified by Frere's actions. "What was the crime of the Zulu?!" became the call-to-arms of liberal leader William Gladstone. In 1880, Bartle Frere was recalled to London to face charges of misconduct, but the conflicts which he initiated were effectively the commencement of the South African Wars.

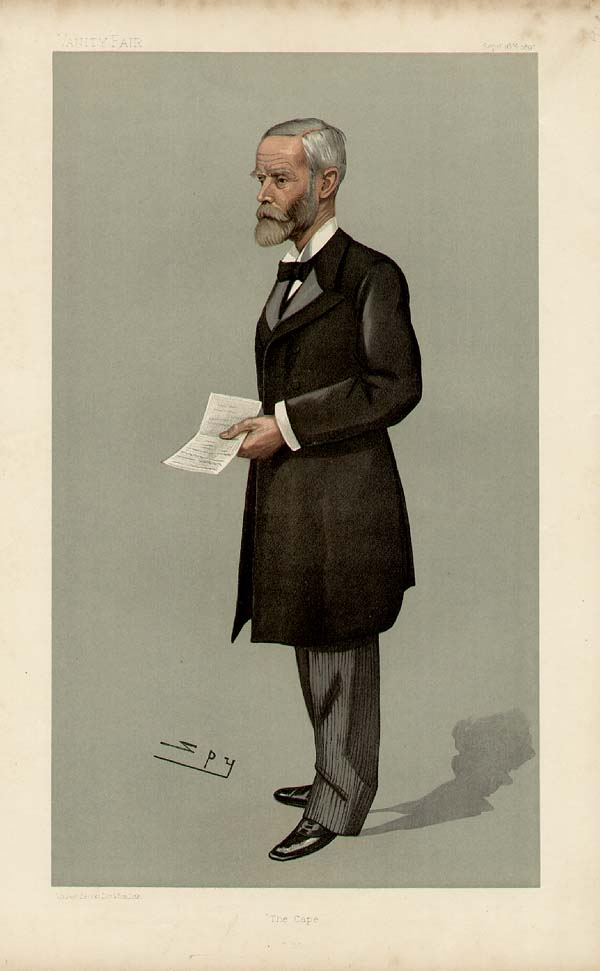
John Gordon Sprigg, from Vanity Fair

John Gordon Sprigg was the local puppet Prime Minister of the Cape (1878–81), whom Bartle Frere installed to lead the Cape Colony into Confederation, after he had deposed the previous elected government. At first, Sprigg had opposed confederation (like most local Cape leaders), but he prudently converted, and Frere offered him the Cape government if he promised to assist the confederation plan. His government consequently pursued expansionist military policies and attempted to segregate and disarm the Cape's Black soldiers and allies. His discriminatory policies shocked much of the Cape's liberal political elite and alienated the Cape's traditional allies – such as the Sotho and Fengu nations. A string of defeats followed – from the superior strategies of the Sotho army, among others. Facing military defeat and bankruptcy, Sprigg became more and more unpopular. Once his imperial protector Bartle Frere was recalled to London, the Sprigg government was overthrown by opposition movements in the Cape Parliament.

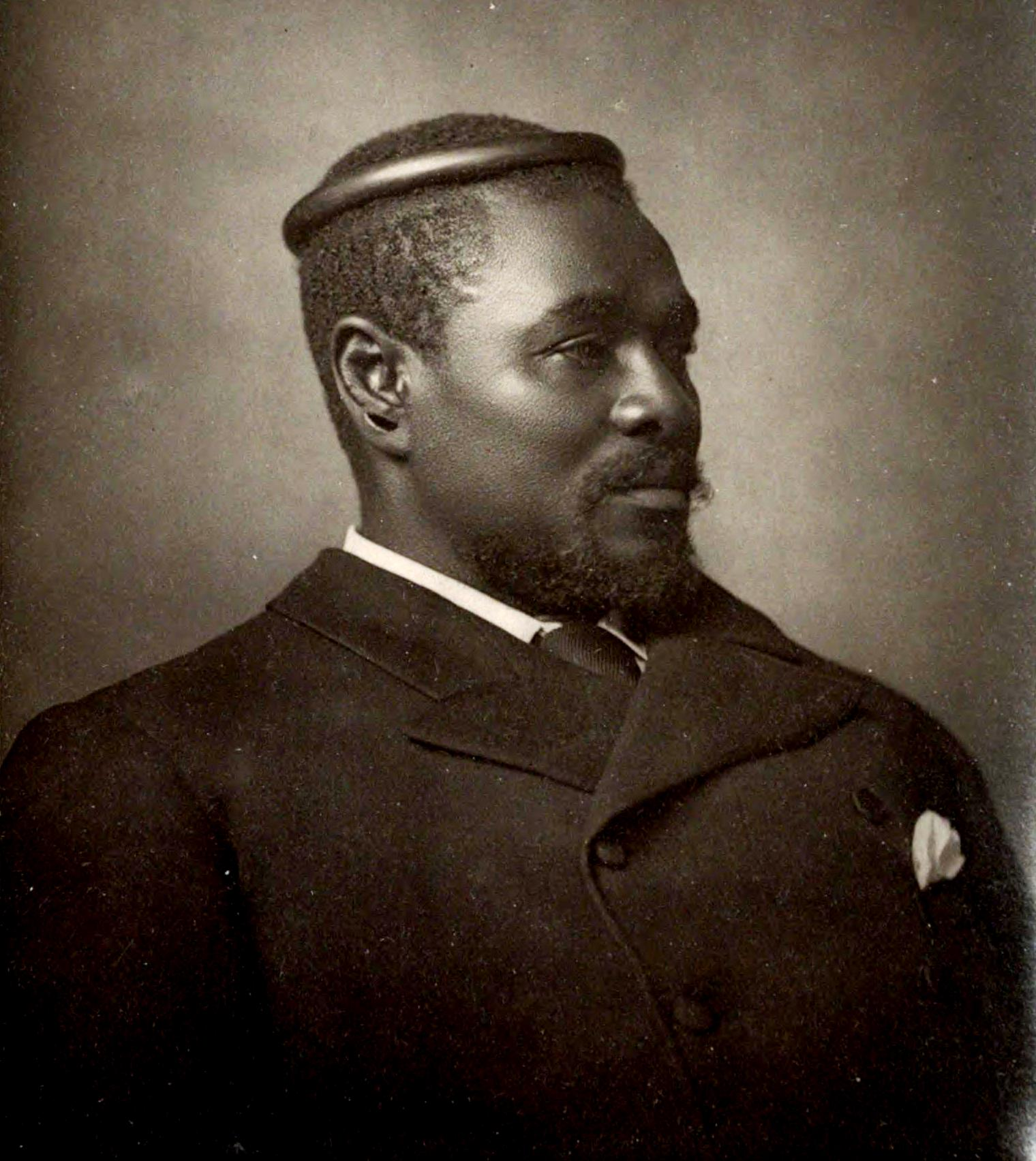
King Cetshwayo kaMpande

The Zulu King Cetshwayo kaMpande was a key figure in confronting British imperialism in Southern Africa. His name means 'The Slandered One'. Cetshwayo was the last independent Zulu King. Bartle Frere felt he needed to conquer the Zulu Kingdom, for the confederation plan to succeed. He attacked the Zulus using the excuse of Cetshwayo's ordering a raid in Natal to seize two Zulu women who were wives of Cetshwayo's favourite chief, Sihayo kaXongo. On 11 December 1878, Frere's representative Sir Theophilus Shepstone informed the Zulu leader that he could either turn in the two men who led this raid into Natal and disarm his army, or face war. The disarmament conditions were deliberately impossible to fulfill, Cetshwayo refused them, and the British attacked the Zulu on 22 January 1879. The British attacked with only 1700 troops while the Zulu brought 24,000. The battle was almost a complete massacre of the British with only sixty Europeans surviving. Cetshwayo and his army were eventually defeated at oNdini on 4 July 1879. He escaped but was recaptured a month later and held as a prisoner of war. In 1882 Cetshwayo was allowed to travel to England and meet with Queen Victoria. While in England he was treated as a public hero by the liberal opposition for his resistance to Britain. Cetshwayo was returned in secret to Zululand on 10 January 1883. On 8 February 1884 Cetshwayo died (likely from poison). His son Dinizulu was proclaimed king on 20 May 1884.

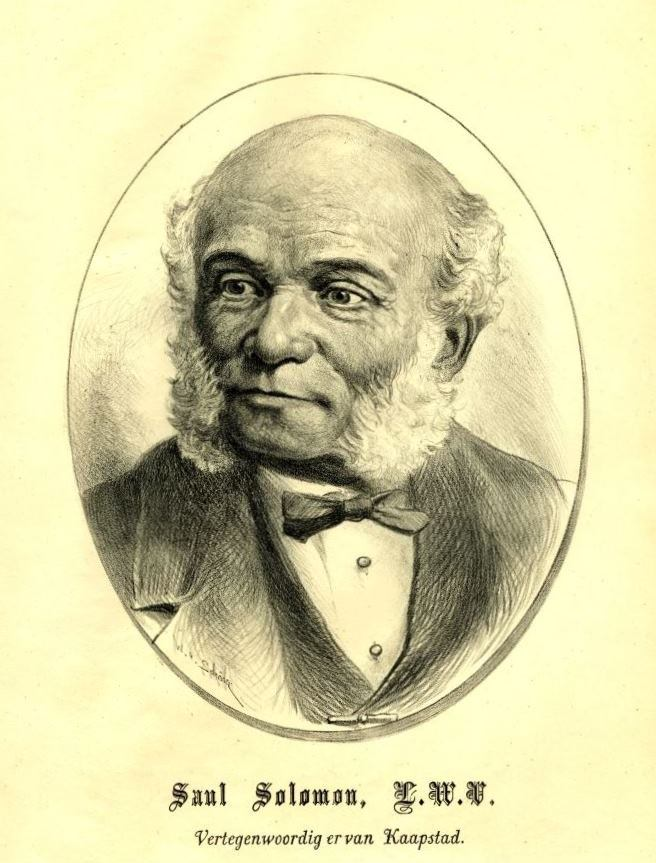
Saul Solomon

Saul Solomon was a personal friend of the Zulu King, and a powerful anti-war MP in the Cape Parliament, where he was a leader of the "Cape Liberal" movement. Originally, he had been an ally and supporter of the Cape's locally elected Prime Minister John Molteno, who had opposed British control. Then after Frere arrived and the government changed, Solomon initially trusted Sprigg when he came to power. But once he realised the nature of Sprigg and Bartle Frere's policies, he became their greatest political enemy in the Cape. When he led the liberal campaign against the Sprigg government, he was targeted in several high-profile political trials, which attempted (unsuccessfully) to silence him. He was instrumental in bringing about Sprigg's downfall in 1881, but Solomon was elderly and retired from politics soon afterwards.

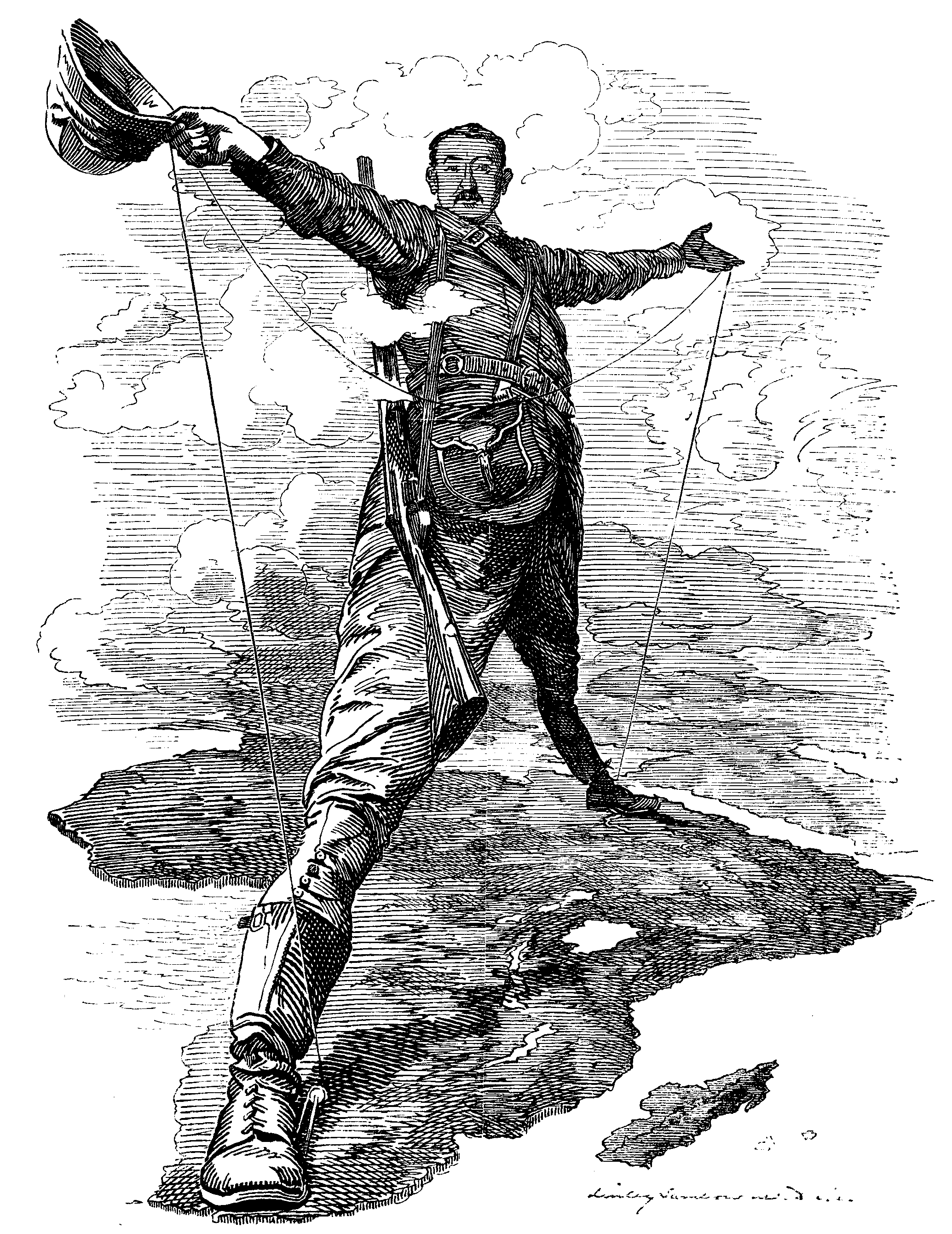
Caricature of Cecil John Rhodes, after he announced plans for a telegraph line from Cape Town to Cairo.

The mining magnate and British imperialist Cecil Rhodes brought about the second wave of the South African Wars, through his desire to control the continent and its diamond and gold resources. Rhodes first gained power through his control of the mining industries. He was the founder of the Diamond Company De Beers, which today markets 40% of the world's rough diamonds and at one time marketed 90%. He used his power in the diamond fields to get elected to parliament and finally, in 1890, he succeeded in becoming Prime Minister of the Cape Colony. He then implemented laws that would benefit mine and industry owners. He introduced the Glen Grey Act to push black people from their lands and make way for industrial development. Rhodes desired control over the Boer Republic of the Transvaal, where the gold mines were located. He launched the Matabele wars, to encircle the Boer republics. Then in 1895 he engineered the infamous Jameson Raid into the Transvaal. The raid failed, and ended in humiliation, but this skirmish eventually led to the Second Anglo-Boer War. Through his conquests inland, Rhodes was also the founder of Rhodesia which later became Zambia and Zimbabwe.

Dr. Leander Jameson was a supporter and admirer of Cecil Rhodes. Rhodes appointed him director of the De Beers Company. Rhodes also used Jameson to launch the notorious "Jameson raid" into the Transvaal. The raid was to overthrow the Boer government of Paul Kruger in 1895 and allow Rhodes to take control. The raid failed, and Jameson was convicted of violating the foreign enlistment act and sentenced to 15 months in prison. After Rhodes's fall, Jameson continued Rhodes's legacy. He became leader of the pro-imperialist "Progressive Party", and in 1904 became Prime Minister of the Cape.

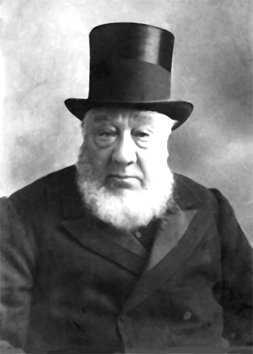
Boer President Paul Kruger

Paul Kruger fought against the British colonization efforts. He was born Stephanus Johannes Paul Kruger on 10 October 1825. Later in life he earned the nickname "Old Lion of the Transvaal" which came from the way he looked. Kruger was against the annexation of the Transvaal region in 1877 and was named the Commandant-general of the Transvaal army before the age of 30. In 1880, Kruger joined with Piet Joubert and M. Pretorius to fight for independence. The Boers won the war in 1883 and Kruger became state president. He remained president for many years. When the Anglo-Boer war broke out, Kruger again led the Boers. In 1900 the British forces advanced on Kruger and his men. Kruger escaped and settled in the Netherlands for the duration of the war. He never returned to the Transvaal. Kruger died on 14 July 1904 in Switzerland. His body was shipped back to the Transvaal and buried in Pretoria, in Heroes Ace.

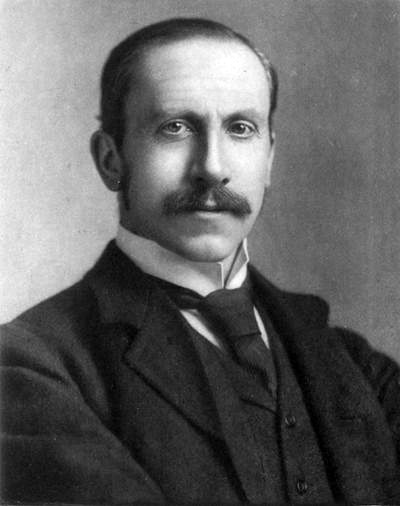
Lord Alfred Milner

Lord Alfred Milner was High Commissioner for Southern Africa (1897–1905), a self-declared "race patriot", and the initiator of the Second Anglo-Boer War. His aggressive style of imperialism was apparent to locals even on his first arrival. On first meeting him, Jan Smuts accurately predicted that Milner would be "a second Bartle Frere" and "... more dangerous than Rhodes". Milner was instrumental in pressurising the Boers into war, through his championing of the cause of the British Uitlanders in the Transvaal. He massively underestimated the cost and duration of the war though, and the British suffered a series of humiliating defeats at the hands of the far smaller Boer forces. Towards the end of the war, he attempted to push through humiliating treaties which would forcibly Anglicise the Boers.

General Herbert Kitchener was the famed British military leader, sent out by Milner to complete the defeat of the Boers in 1899. Unable to defeat the Boer commandos and their guerrilla warfare tactics, Kitchener resorted to systematic burning of Boer civilian settlements and homesteads, as "Scorched Earth" tactics to initiate a famine. He also made large-scale use of concentration camps for the Boer civilian population. Roughly 26,370 Boer women and children (81% were children) died in these concentration camps, and roughly 20,000 Black African prisoners died in similar camps. However, in 1902 they eventually succeeded in pressurizing the Boer commandos to surrender and sign the Treaty of Vereeniging.

The famous writer Rudyard Kipling was strongly in favor of the British colonisation of Africa. He was also a personal friend of Cecil Rhodes. When the Boer War broke out, Kipling joined in campaign efforts to raise money for the troops and reported for army publications. While involved in this campaign, Kipling would be forced to view the tragedies of war. He witnessed people dying from typhoid and dysentery and also witnessed the bad barrack conditions. He wrote poetry in support of the British cause in the Boer War. In early 1900 Kipling helped start a newspaper called The Friend for British troops in Bloemfontein. Kipling eventually left South Africa and returned to England, where he was already highly regarded as the poet of the empire.

=== Women's voices in the War ===
Women had a highly restricted role in 19th century society, but in spite of this, several women nonetheless succeeded in becoming prominent voices on the South African Wars.

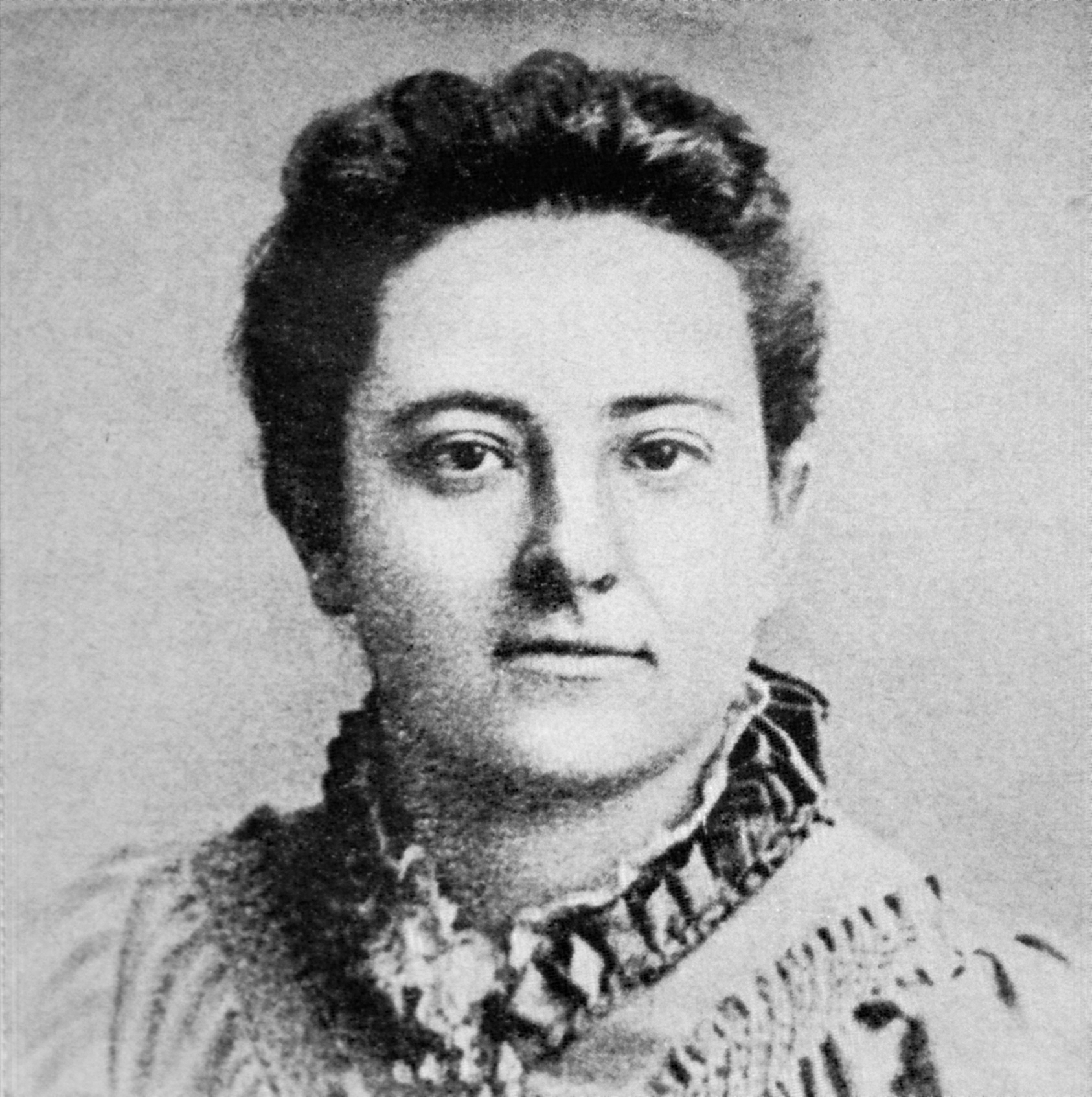
Olive Schreiner (1889)

Olive Schreiner was a sympathizer with the Boers. She was a writer and a strong opponent of British Imperial policy. She addressed the human side of the war, by sympathizing with the Boer women who were forced to send their men off to war despite their lack of military training. Boer men younger than 16 and older than 60 faced a well trained and supplied British military (England, with Canada and Australia). Schreiner also admired the Orange Free State's prolonged resistance to the British occupation.

Elizabeth Maria Molteno was a writer, a suffragette, and an early civil rights activist, who was also a prominent anti-war campaigner. She was a founding member of the South Africa Conciliation Committee (1899) and organized mass protests against British policies. She identified strongly with the continent of Africa and its peoples, and she urged all races in South Africa to do likewise. She later worked with Gandhi, Sol Plaatje and John Dube in their different struggles for civil and political rights.

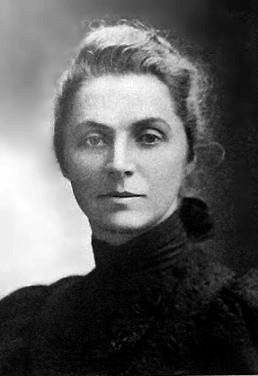
Emily Hobhouse, the anti-war activist.

Emily Hobhouse was without doubt the most influential voice of women, during the Anglo-Boer war. She was a founding member and Secretary of the South Africa Conciliation Committee (1899) and one of the first female investigative journalists in a war zone. She travelled to the South African war zone on behalf of the South African Women and Children Distress Fund. In her report, she exposed the mistreatment of the women and children in the Boer refugee camps. As a result, she was arrested and deported. She was probably the most powerful agitator against conditions of the Boer concentration camps.

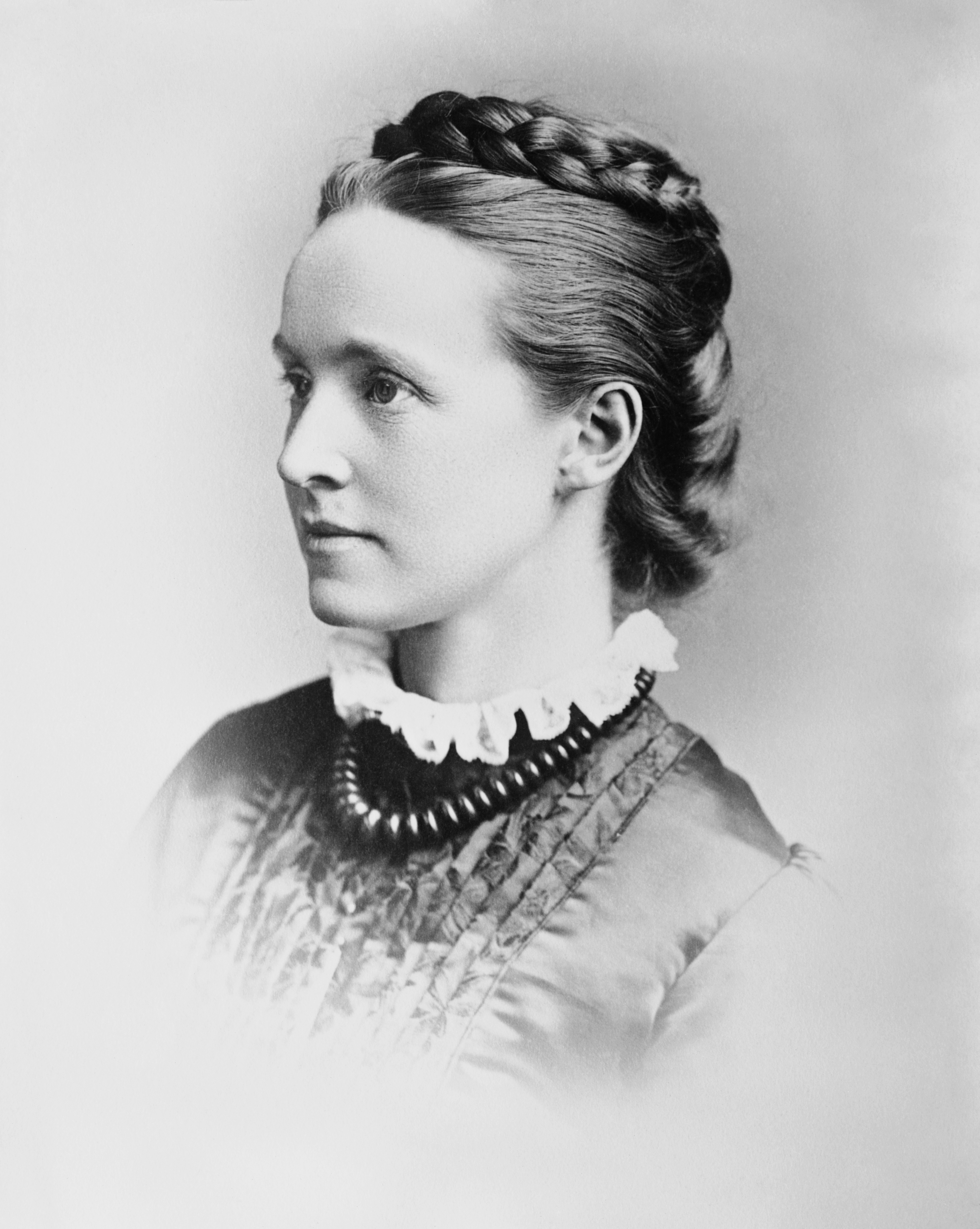
Millicent Garrett Fawcett

Millicent Garrett Fawcett was an investigative journalist who was pro-war. Fawcett justified the maltreatment of Boer women and children in the concentration camps, by stating that they participated in war by supplying their men with vital British military information, making them part of the war effort and consequently deserving of the same war treatment as combatants. She also blamed the Boer mothers for their children's deaths in the concentration camps. She often emphasized "race" and described the unhygienic conditions as if they were natural for the Boer women but failed to mention that they were obviously not supplied with soap in the concentration camps. She compared Boers to 17th century English ignorant peasants.

== In fiction ==
The Boer War has been the focus of a considerable body of fiction numbering over two hundred novels and at least fifty short stories in English, Afrikaans, French, German Dutch, Swedish and even Urdu if we count the translation of Rider Haggard's Jess in 1923.

For the social and literary historian, it provides over a hundred-year record of the relationship between literature and history.

The vast majority of novels and short stories about the Anglo-Boer conflict were published around the time of the war and reflect the values and attitudes to British imperialism. Some of the titles published then give a fairly accurate impression of the patriotic fervour which found its way into print: B. Ronan, The Passing of the Boer (1899); E. Ames, The Tremendous Twins, or How the Boers were Beaten (1900); C.D. Haskim, For the Queen in South Africa (1900); F. Russell, The Boer's Blunder (1900); H. Nisbet, For Right and England (1900) and The Empire Makers (1900). Among the more notable literary figures of the day who were closely associated with the events of the Anglo‑Boer conflict were Rudyard Kipling (1865–1936); Winston Churchill (1874–1965); H. Rider Haggard (1856–1925); Sir Arthur Conan Doyle (1859–1930); Sir Percy Fitzpatrick (1862–1931); Edgar Wallace (1875–1932); and John Buchan (1875–1940).

Some of the most interesting names associated with satirising the Anglo‑Boer conflict include H.H. Munro (Saki) (Alice in Pall Mall, 1900); G.K. Chesterton (The Napoleon of Nottinghill, 1904), Hilaire Belloc (Mr. Clutterbuck's Election, 1908) and Kipling: "Fables for the Staff", published in The Friend in 1900 in which he lampooned the incompetence of the British general staff. Douglas Blackburn's A Burgher Quixote (1903) is one of the most undervalued works in South African literature.

The end of the Great War saw an interesting ideological shift from imperialism to an ideological commitment to the Union of South Africa. The conflict after the World War 1 is depicted essentially as a civil war in which the members of the same family who have fought on opposite sides must now, for their common good, make peace. This is an attitude already anticipated in Francis Bancroft's (Mrs. Francis Carey Slater's) early novels The Veldt Dwellers (1912) and Thane Brandon (1913). It is also the major theme in Daphne Muir's A Virtuous Woman (1929), Norman McKoewn's The Ridge of White Waters (1934), F.A.M. Webster's African Cavalcade (1936), as well as Kathleen Sinclair's saga which includes Walking the Whirlwind (1940), The Sun Rises Slowly (1942) and The Covenant (1944).

From the 1930s there is a diminishing concern with depicting the causes and consequences of the Boer War as dogmatic assertions to be attacked or defended. Coincidentally, there has been a tendency to depict the struggle from the Boer point of view, as in W C Scully's The Harrow (1921), Daphne Muir's A Virtuous Woman (1929) and Manfred Nathan's Sarie Marais (1938).

Seen within the wider context of South African literature the racial theme that had to a large extent lain dormant in Boer War fiction during the imperial phase now begins to assert itself. Only one novelist who wrote about the war during the imperial phase, George Cossins in A Boer of To‑day (1900), admits to a black‑white problem.

Since 1948 the call for unity between Afrikaner and English has remained, but the race issue has become more and more focal. Race relations are a major preoccupation in Henry Gibb's four book saga: The Splendour and the Dust (1955), The Winds of Time (1956), Thunder at Dawn (1957) and The Tumult and the Shouting (1957), and Daphne Rooke's Mittee (1951).

Most writers since 1948, with some notable exceptions, have treated the war largely as the backdrop for historical romance: Stuart Cloete, Rags of Glory (1963); Sam Manion, The Great Hunger (1964); Wilbur Smith, The Sound of Thunder (1966); Dorothy Eden, Siege in the Sun (1967); Josephine Edgar, Time of Dreaming (1968); Daphne Pearson, The Marigold Field (1970); Jenny Seed, The Red Dust Soldiers (1972); Desiree Meyler, The Gods Are Just (1973); and Ronald Pearsall, Tides of War (1978). At the same time there is a greater interest in addressing such vexed questions as the concentration camps, the effects of martial law, the 'Handsuppers' and the results of the scorched earth policy.

The South African conflict was in many respects a civil war. Not only were there many Boers from the Cape, and later the two republics, who joined the National Scouts and fought for the British, but there were many Cape Boers who joined the commandos. This aspect of the war produced some of its finest responses in fiction, for example Herman Charles Bosman's short stories "The Traitor's Wife" and "The Affair at Ysterspruit", and Louis C. Leipoldt's novel Stormwrack (1980). The question of divided loyalties is a large issue in Boer War fiction.

Nor did the conflict end with the war. As late as 1980 a successful Australian film Breaker Morant was based on Kenneth Ross's play and Kit Denton's novel The Breaker (1973).

The Boer War has continued to be a popular subject for escapist fiction. Whereas the writers at the height of the Empire were overwhelmingly British, with the decline of imperialism the field is now dominated by South African writers.

== See also ==
- Boer Wars
- Anglo-Zulu War
- Military history of South Africa

== Sources ==
- Hyam, Ronald (2002). Britain's Imperial Century 1815–1914 (3rd ed.). New York: Palgrave Macmillan.
- Meredith, Martin (2007). Diamonds and Gold and War. New York: Public Affairs. ISBN 978-1-58648-473-6.
- Morton, William J. (1877). "The South African Diamond Fields, and a Journey to the Mines". Journal of the American Geographical Society of New York. 9.
- Pakenham, Thomas (1979). The Boer War. New York: Random House.
- Saunders, Christopher (1983). Historical Dictionary of South Africa. London: The Scarecrow Press.
