= Fripp (surname) =

Fripp is an English surname of uncertain derivation, possibly a metonymic occupational name for a clothes dealer. Notable people with the surname include:

- Alfie Fripp (1913–2013), British airman
- Alfred Downing Fripp (artist) (1822–1895), British watercolourist
- Alfred Downing Fripp (surgeon) (1865–1930), British physician
- Alfred Ernest Fripp (1866–1938), Canadian lawyer and politician
- Betty Fripp (1904–1975), British Girl Guide executive
- Charles Edwin Fripp (1854–1906), English painter
- Edgar Innes Fripp (1861–1931), English Unitarian minister and antiquarian
- George Arthur Fripp (1813–1896), British watercolourist
- Henry Charles Innes Fripp (1867–1963), English artist
- Johnny Fripp (1921–2022), Canadian skier and football player
- Kim Fripp (1952–2023), Canadian ski jumper
- Robert Fripp (born 1946), British guitarist
- Robert McKay Fripp (1858–1917), English architect
- Thomas Fripp (1864-1931), Canadian artist

== See also ==
- Fripp (disambiguation)
