= Crease (surname) =

Crease is a surname. Notable people with the surname include:

- Henry Pering Pellew Crease (1823–1905), British lawyer, judge, and politician
- Jimmy Crease (born 1950), former association football player
- Kevin Crease (1936–2007), South Australian television presenter and newsreader
- Robert P. Crease (born 1953), American philosopher and historian of science
- Susan Reynolds Crease (1855–1947), English-born Canadian artist and activist for women's rights
- Sarah Lindley Crease (1826–1922), Canadian artist
- Josephine Crease (1864–1947), Canadian artist
