= Betty Fripp =

British Girl Guide executive (1904–1975)

Betty Fripp OBE
- Fripp in a 1925 newspaper
- Born: Betty Agnes Fripp; 16 March 1904; London, England
- Died: 23 December 1975 (aged 71); West Lulworth, Dorset
- Family: Alfred Downing Fripp (father)

Betty Agnes Fripp OBE (16 March 1904 - 23 December 1975) was a British Girl Guide executive. She received the Silver Fish Award, the movement's highest adult honour, in 1954. She was awarded an OBE for services to Guiding in 1960. She was a competitive swimmer in the 1920s. In 1966 she trained the first all-Girl-Guide team to swim the English Channel.

== Personal life ==
Fripp was the second child of five born to Sir Alfred Downing Fripp (1865–1930), honorary surgeon to King Edward VII, and Lady Margaret Scott, née Haywood (1880–1965). Fripp was an accomplished swimmer, as were her siblings. In the 1920s, she won several large competitions, including the championship and rose bowl at the London Bath Club.

She qualified as a secretary at Hilda Neal's secretarial school, which, at the time, was the "fashionable" thing to do. She was a member of the Ancient Order of Froth Blowers, a charitable organisation set up by one of her father's patients, with the title "Tornado".

She lived at Portland Place in the 1920s and 1930s. She was living at Chatsworth Court, London when she died.

== Girl Guides ==
Fripp joined the Girl Guide movement as a Brownie. Her mother was one of the first London commissioners. Fripp later ran a Girl Guide company in London's East End, and was Girl Guide division commissioner for East Central. Other roles she held for Girl Guides included:

- Public Relations Committee, chair
- International commissioner for Great Britain
- Hospitality Committee, chair

She was involved in the "greatest Guide camp Cambridgeshire has ever known", commemorating the 21st birthday of the movement, in 1932. In 1954 she received the Silver Fish award, the movement's highest adult honour. She was awarded an OBE for services to Guiding in 1960. In 1966, Fripp organised and trained a record-breaking all-Girl-Guide team to swim the English Channel.
