= Margaret Kitto =

Canadian painter and educator

Margaret Elizabeth Kitto
- Born: July 28, 1873; London, England, United Kingdom
- Died: August 9, 1925 (aged 52); Victoria, British Columbia, Canada
- Known for: Painting, teaching
- Notable work: establishment of an art gallery in Victoria's Crystal Garden (1925)
- Style: watercolour, painting local scenes

Margaret Elizabeth Kitto (July 28, 1873 – August 9, 1925) was an English-born Canadian artist and educator.

The daughter of Francis Bowyer Kitto and Lavinia Mary Tilly, she was born in London and came to Victoria with her family in 1891. In 1922, she opened the Deco Art Studio with Lillian Sweeney, also an artist; they produced and sold various arts and crafts. Kitto taught at the Sacred Heart Convent School and the Western Art Studio; she later taught evening classes for the local school board. Her pupils included Edythe Hembroff-Schleicher, who was Emily Carr's friend and biographer. She was a member of the Island Arts and Crafts Society, serving on the executive board from 1911 to 1917 and was vice-president in 1925. With Josephine Crease, she led sketching parties for the Society.

Her efforts led to the establishment of an art gallery in Victoria's Crystal Garden in 1925.

She mainly worked in watercolour, painting local scenes. Her work is included in the collections of the Art Gallery of Greater Victoria and the British Columbia Provincial Archives. Her work was included in a 2016 exhibition Water+Pigment+Paper at the Art Gallery of Greater Victoria.

She died in Victoria in 1925.
