= Susan Reynolds Crease =

English-born Canadian artist and activist for women's rights

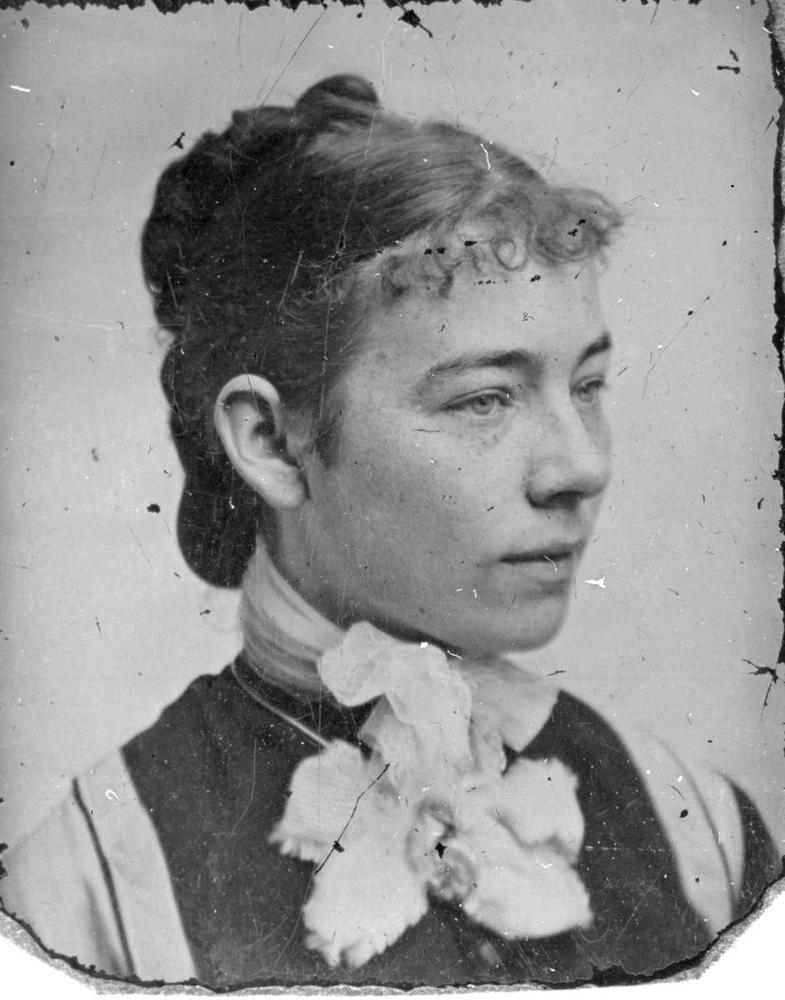
- Born: November 18, 1855; Antron, Cornwall
- Died: July 15, 1947 (aged 91)
- Education: King's College London

Susan Reynolds Crease (November 18, 1855 – July 15, 1947) was an English-born Canadian artist and activist for women's rights.

== Life ==
The daughter of Sir Henry Pering Pellew Crease and Lady Sarah Lindley Crease, she was born in Antron, Cornwall and came to Victoria, British Columbia in 1860. Crease moved to New Westminster with her family in 1862, returning to Victoria six years later. She took private art lessons in Canada and England, also attending art classes at King's College in London with her sister Josephine. Crease produced a number of watercolours of Vancouver Island. She was a member of the Island Arts and Crafts Society.

From 1884 to 1933, she was a member of the local Local Council of Women and helped promote the visit of suffragist Emily Pankhurst.

The diaries of Susan and her mother, Sarah, are noted for their portrait of Victoria life at the turn of the 20th century. Crease died in Victoria at the age of 91.

Her work is included in the collection of the University of British Columbia.
