= Alfred Fripp =

Alfred Fripp may refer to:

- Alfred Downing Fripp (artist) (1822–1895), British artist
- Alfred Downing Fripp (surgeon) (1865–1930), English surgeon
- Alfred Ernest Fripp (1866–1938), Canadian lawyer and politician
- Alfie Fripp (Alfred George Fripp, 1913–2013), longest serving and oldest surviving British World War II prisoner of war
