= Crease =

Crease may refer to:

- A line (geometry) or mark made by folding or doubling any pliable substance
- Crease (band), American hard rock band that formed in Ft. Lauderdale, Florida
- The Creases, an Australian indie rock band formed in Brisbane
- Crease pattern, origami diagram type that consists of all or most of the creases in the final model
- Crease Range, mountain range in northern western British Columbia, Canada
- Skin crease, areas of skin where it folds

== People ==
- Crease (surname)

== Sports ==
- Crease (cricket), area demarcated by white lines painted or chalked on the field of play
- Crease (hockey), volume of space in an ice rink directly in front of the goalie net, indicated by painted red lines on the rink surface
- Crease, in lacrosse, white circle around the orange net, into which only the goalie and defense may step
