= The Last Stand at Isandlwana =

1885 painting by Charles Edwin Fripp

- The Last Stand at Isandhula
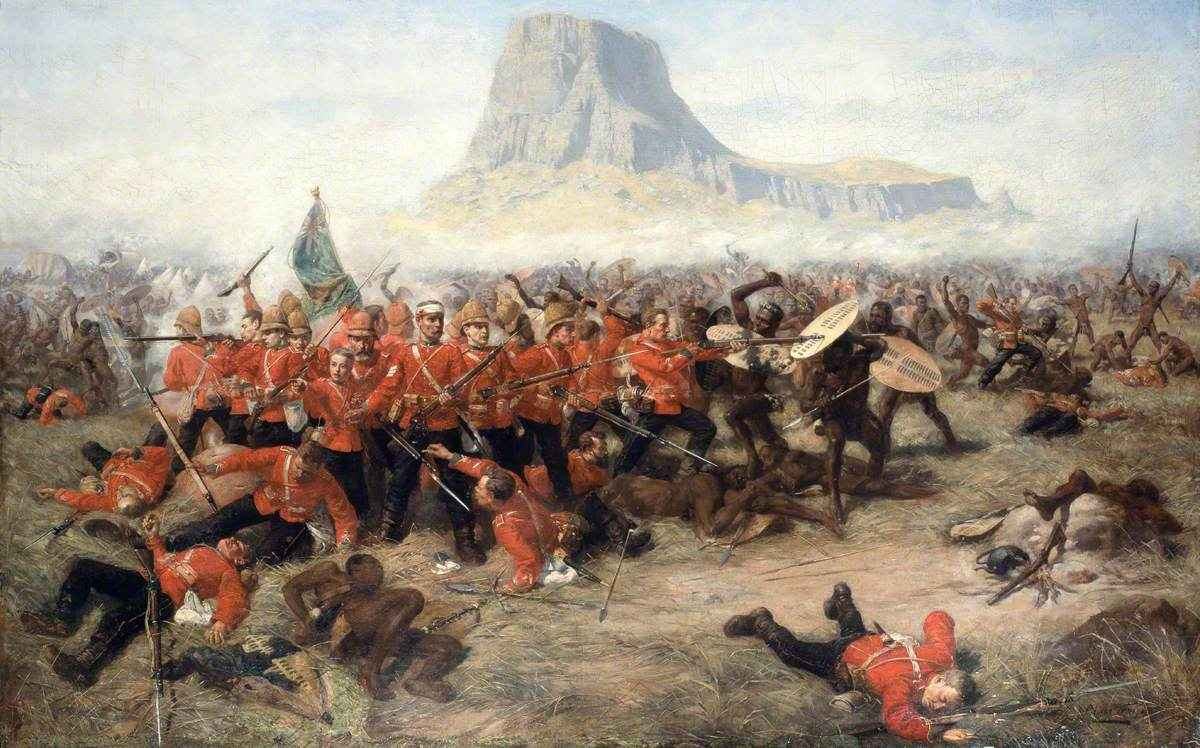
- Artist: Charles Edwin Fripp
- Year: 1885
- Medium: Oil painting
- Subject: Battle of Isandlwana
- Condition: On display
- Location: National Army Museum, London

The Last Stand at Isandlwana (originally titled The Last Stand at Isandhula) is an oil painting by Charles Edwin Fripp. It depicts the last stand of the British army at the battle of Isandlwana, and is considered one of the most notable portrayals of the Anglo-Zulu war. It is exhibited at the National Army Museum, in London.

== Title and subject ==
The Last Stand at Isandlwana depicts the 1879 battle of Isandlwana, the first major engagement of the Anglo-Zulu war between the British Empire and the Zulu Kingdom. Having invaded Zululand, the British Army under Lord Chelmsford suffered a major defeat at Isandlwana, partially mitigated by the successful defense of Rorke's Drift of the same day. The British forces subsequently reorganized, invaded Zululand again and captured the Zulu king Cetshwayo, winning the war.

The depiction of the battle is likely an artistic liberty taken by its author, Charles Edwin Fripp, and probably does not represent the actual unfolding of the combat. The initial title was The Last Stand at Isandhula, an incorrect spelling of the name of the isolated Mount Isandlwana, South Africa, where the event occurred.

== Description ==
The painting depicts the British last stand at the battle of Isandlwana, focusing on a company of soldiers in the foreground attempting to form an infantry square, a common military tactic in the British Army during the 19th century. The few remaining British soldiers are struggling to hold their position, and their camp is visible in the background being completely overrun by the Zulu impi. Despite being mostly static, the painting effectively depicts the confusion and the furious struggle that occurred during the battle.

Among the British soldiers is visible a young drummer boy; this is an artistic liberty taken by the author as no boy is recorded being present among the troops at Isandlwana. The absence of any officer figure is also remarkable, most likely a deliberate omission by Fripp to criticize the widely perceived incompetence of the British commanders. Fripp's depiction of the Zulus was notably accurate for the time, as he was fond of the Zulu after witnessing their warriors' courage at the battle of Ulundi.

== History ==
=== Genesis ===
Fripp, a correspondent for the weekly newspaper The Graphic, was sent to South Africa to report the war once it broke out. He allegedly visited the battlefield at Isandlwana some weeks after the massacre, witnessing the skeletal remains of unburied bodies. This grim vision inspired Fripp to portray the heroism of the defeated British Army.

Historian Ian Knight casts some doubt on whether Fripp actually visited Isandlwana. The reporter undoubtedly went to South Africa in 1879, as he followed Lord Chelmsford in his second invasion of the Zululand later that year. As part of the army, Fripp witnessed the battles of Gingindlovu and Ulundi, where he was nearly killed. However, Knight notes that the depiction of Mount Isandlwana is factually wrong, as its depiction in the painting is very inaccurate. He speculates that Fripp only saw Isandlwana in some contemporary photographs, which depicted a large cairn on the side of the mountain very similar to what came to be the painting's image. This, and the absence in the notes of Fripp of any reference to a battlefield visit, seem to corroborate Knight's theory, although there is no definitive confirmation.

=== Public reception and fame ===
Fripp worked on the painting for some years. A previous work of his, also portraying the events of Isandlwana and depicting the death of officers Nevill Coghill and Teignmouth Melvill, was well received by the public in 1881. Isandhula was his most ambitious project at the time, and Fripp was fairly confident in its potential success.

The painting was finished and exhibited in 1885 at the Royal Academy of Arts in London, but it was met with general indifference. Having ended six years prior, the general interest in the Anglo-Zulu war had considerably diminished, and the British public was reluctant and embarrassed to remember the biggest defeat in the conflict. The visit of Zulu king Cetshwayo in Britain in 1882 also changed the general opinion over the Zulus, making the press and the public much less hostile towards them.

Following its financial unsuccess, the painting became property of the National Army Museum in London, where is still exhibited to this day. Over the next years and decades The Last Stand at Isandlwana experienced a growing level of popularity, becoming one of the most notable pieces of art regarding the Anglo-Zulu war, and as one of the most notorious and reproduced military paintings of all time.

== Conservation ==
Over decades of continuous display at the National Army Museum, the painting suffered gradual and substantial damage. The piece was water damaged by improper storage, and the original varnish had gradually turned yellow, rendering the colors opaque. During the 20th century some poorly done touch-ups were made to the painting, further damaging it. Some minor sections also went missing over time.

In 2016 personnel from the National Army Museum began a restoration process of the painting, removing dirt, repainting the missing portions and restoring the original bright colours. Historic photographs of the painting itself were used as reference in order to obtain the most accurate result.
