= Josephine Crease =

Canadian painter

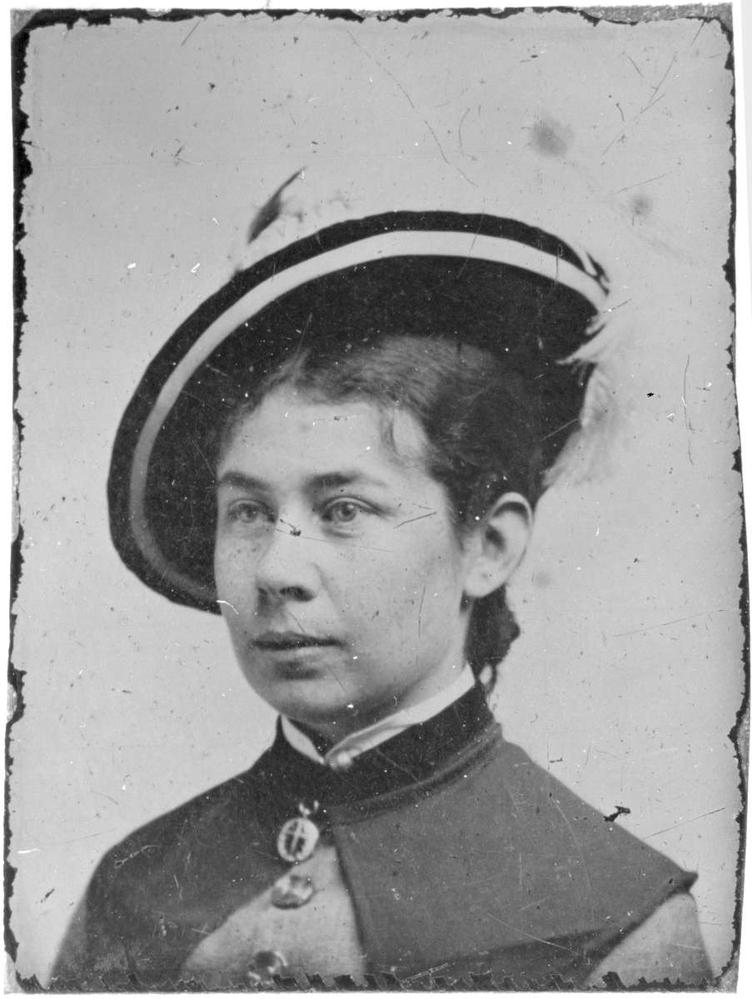
- Born: 7 August 1864; New Westminster, British Columbia Colony
- Died: 24 December 1947 (aged 83); Victoria, British Columbia
- Education: King's College London

Josephine Crease (August 7, 1864 – December 24, 1947) was a Canadian artist.

== Life ==
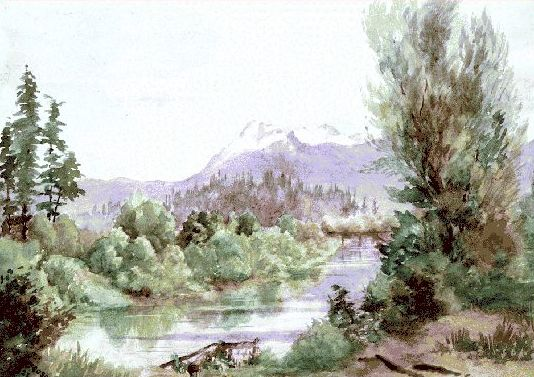
One of her watercolours

She was the daughter of Sir Henry Pering Pellew Crease and Lady Sarah Lindley Crease. She was born in New Westminster and moved to Victoria with her family in 1869. She attended art classes at King's College in London with her sister Susan.

Crease took sketching trips around Vancouver Island and painted watercolours of local landscapes. She was a founding member of the Island Arts and Crafts Society, serving as its honorary president in 1939, and a member of the Victoria Sketch Club, serving as its president in 1903. She was included in exhibitions by the British Columbia Society of Fine Arts, at the Vancouver Art Gallery, which exhibited her work in 1978, and at the Victoria Fair.

She died in Victoria at the age of 83.

Her work is held in the collections of the Provincial Archives of British Columbia and the Art Gallery of Greater Victoria.
