= Henry Charles Innes Fripp =

English artist (1867–1963)

- Bathing Maidens Surprised by a Knight by Henry Charles Innes Fripp
- Born: Henry Charles Innes Fripp; 10 May 1867; Clifton, Bristol, England
- Died: 13 January 1963; Battersea, London, England

Henry Charles Innes Fripp (1867-1963) was an English painter, genre artist and illustrator, stained glass maker, designer, and teacher. Many of his illustrations appear under the name Innes Fripp.

He was born in 1867 to a family of well known public officials and artists. His actual birth date is unknown, but church records show he was christened on 10 May 1867 at Clifton, St John the Evangelist, Gloucestershire, England. His father was Samuel Charles Fripp and his mother was Clara Fripp. Samuel Charles Fripp was an architect and sculptor, and a committee member of the Royal West of England Academy. His uncle was the noted landscape painter George Arthur Fripp of the Royal Watercolour Society, while his great great grandfather was the highly regarded maritime painter Nicholas Pocock. His cousin was the surgeon Sir Alfred Downing Fripp. Downing Fripp wrote "Human Anatomy For Art Students" illustrated by Innes Fripp published in 1911 by J. B. Lippincott, Philadelphia.

Fripp studied at the Bristol School of Art and the Royal College of Art before moving on to study in Paris. He also taught at the Royal College of Art where he was an Assistant Master, the Lambeth School of Art, and at Queen's College in London where he was Professor of Art.

His exhibits include 19 paintings shown at the Royal Academy of Arts between 1893 and 1946, featuring a design for a stained glass window entitled "The Danaids", and the paintings The Waterwitch, Evening Light, and The Forum: Pompei, 21 paintings with the Royal Institute of Painters in Water Colours, 17 works at the Dudley Gallery, and several exhibited at the Walker Gallery, Manchester City Art Gallery and the New Gallery in London, once a prominent venue for Pre-Raphaelite, Aesthetic movement and industrial and applied arts.

Innes designed a plaque for the Ancient Order of Froth Blowers, a charity "to foster the noble Art and gentle and healthy Pastime of froth blowing amongst Gentlemen of-leisure and ex-Soldiers", which was created by Albert Temple in gratitude to Alfred Downing Fripp whose surgical skills saved his life. The charity was at its most popular in the 1920s, with most of the funds raised donated to the Invalid Children's Aid Association. The plaque designed by Innes Fripp was created to accompany donations of £500 (about £20,000 in today's money) to fund the costs of 50 children's hospital beds.

Most of his best-known works are of fantasy or religious themes, including "The Centaur at Play", "Madonna and Child", and his series of illustrations for "The Gateway to Romance" by Emily Underdown, for which Innes Fripp did the illustrations in 1909 for publisher Thomas Nelson And Sons, and Lancelot and Guenevere by Gladys Davidson, illustrated by Fripp, published in 1912 by Dana Estes and Co.

He married Winifred Mary Pottow on 1 August 1899 in Bristol, Gloucester. They had three children, Barbara Innes Fripp, Stephen Innes Fripp, and Geoffrey Innes Fripp. Geoffrey Fripp served in Lord Strathcona's Horse 6 Hussars with the rank of Major. Stephen Innes Fripp achieved the rank of 2nd Lt Infantry while serving during World War II.

He lived at Oxberry Avenue, Fulham in 1891 and Jubilee Place in 1894. His Kensington Studios location was in Prince's Square, London from 1897 to 1946.

He died on 13 January 1963, leaving an estate valued at approximately £3,500, about £65,000 in today's money.
