= Jimmy Campbell and Reg Connelly =

20th century British songwriting duo

Jimmy Campbell
- Born: James Alexander Campbell-Tyrie; 5 April 1903; Gosforth, Northumberland, England
- Died: 19 August 1967 (aged 64); London, England
- Occupation: Songwriter
- Years active: c.1925–1950s

Reg Connelly
- Born: Reginald John Connelly; 22 October 1895; Buckhurst Hill, Essex, England
- Died: 23 September 1963 (aged 67); Poole, Dorset, England
- Occupations: Songwriter, music publisher
- Years active: c.1925–1960s

Jimmy Campbell (born James Alexander Campbell-Tyrie; 5 April 1903–19 August 1967) and Reg Connelly (born Reginald John Connelly; 22 October 1895–23 September 1963) were English songwriters and music publishers. Writing together in the 1920s and 1930s, they sometimes used the pseudonym Irving King for their song compositions, and often worked as lyricists in collaboration with other composers. Together, they established the successful music publishing firm Campbell Connelly.

== Early life and songwriting partnership ==
Connelly was born in Buckhurst Hill, Essex, in 1895, and Campbell in Gosforth, Northumberland, in 1903. They had contrasting personalities: Campbell was extravagant and dismissive of financial security, while Connelly was reserved, and an astute businessman. By 1925 they had started working together as songwriters, and wrote "Show Me the Way to Go Home". After failing to find a publisher, they formed their own publishing company in London, initially in Tottenham Court Road. The song became a big hit in both Britain and America, reportedly selling some 2 million copies as sheet music, and was recorded by many bands from the 1920s onwards, most successfully by Vincent Lopez in 1926.

The pair moved their office to Denmark Street in 1926, and formally established the music publishing firm Campbell Connelly in 1929. They wrote their first "standard", "If I Had You," in 1928, with composer Ted Shapiro. The song was later recorded by Judy Garland, Nat King Cole, Frank Sinatra, and many others. They had further success in 1931 with "Goodnight Sweetheart," written with composer Ray Noble and recorded by Guy Lombardo, Al Bowlly and Rudy Vallee among others.

One of their most successful songs, "Try a Little Tenderness", was written with Harry M. Woods in 1932. First recorded by Ray Noble's Mayfair Dance Orchestra, it was a hit for the Ted Lewis Orchestra, and was successfully revived by soul singer Otis Redding in 1966. Their other compositions included the Froth Blowers' anthem, "The More We Are Together", and "I'd Rather Be a Beggar with You Than a King with Somebody Else" which was co-composed with Oliver Perry, and was recorded in 1931 by the New Mayfair Dance Orchestra with an uncredited Al Bowlly on vocals.

== Later lives ==
Connelly continued to run the music publishing business, and in 1933 joined forces with the Gaumont-British film company to corner the market for songs presented in British films, notably those starring Jessie Matthews. The company also established deals with American companies, building the publishing business into one of the most successful in the world with 14 associated companies. Among the popular songs published by Campbell Connelly in later years were "I Left My Heart in San Francisco", "Big Spender", and "Sunny".

Campbell married actress Betty Balfour (adding Balfour to his own name by deed poll), and in 1936 sold his stake in the publishing company. He organised a tour of Australia with a dance band, but it was a commercial disaster, and Campbell returned to Britain to face a large tax bill. After his divorce in 1941, and a period attempting to find work in Hollywood, he worked in London as a song plugger with Noel Gay, before rejoining Campbell Connelly. In 1951, Campbell wrote "Down at the Ferryboat Inn" with Don Pelosi; it was recorded by the Beverley Sisters. However, The Times reported in 1953 that he had "treated money casually", becoming homeless and an alcoholic. He remarried, moving with his second wife to Spain and later Tangier.

Connelly died in Poole, Dorset, in 1963, aged 67. Campbell died in London in 1967, aged 64. The publishing house Campbell Connelly was sold to The Music Sales Group in 1982.
