= Frip =

Frip may refer to:

- FRIP or Revolutionary and Popular Indoamericano Front (Frente Indoamericano Revolucionario y Popular), political movement in Argentina
- Frip, fictional village in children's book The Very Persistent Gappers of Frip by George Saunders

== See also ==
- Fripp (disambiguation)
