= Victoria Sketch Club =

The Victoria Sketch Club is a Canadian arts organization, the oldest Canadian arts group west of Ontario.

It was established in 1909 as The Island Arts Club. The 56 charter members included Emily Carr, Samuel Maclure and Josephine Crease. The club's stated purpose was "to bring together artists and those interested in art; to hold public exhibitions of art and craft work; and to stimulate general interest in arts and crafts". It was renamed the Island Arts and Crafts Society in 1912. Most early members were immigrants from Britain and were interested in portraying the local scenery. In 1952, the society was renamed The Sketch Club and subsequently became the Victoria Sketch Club. The club continues to hold an annual exhibition of members' work.

In 2009, the Maltwood Art Museum and Gallery presented a retrospective Rebels and Realists: 100 Years of the Victoria Sketch Club.

== Notable members ==
- Emily Carr
- Samuel Maclure
- Jack Shadbolt
- Max Maynard
- Ted Harrison
- Ina Uhthoff
- Katharine Maltwood
- Stella Langdale
- Sarah Lindley Crease
- Thomas Fripp
- Edythe Hembroff
- Margaret Kitto
- Sophie Pemberton
- Nell Bradshaw
