= Thomas Fripp =

Canadian artist (1864-1931)

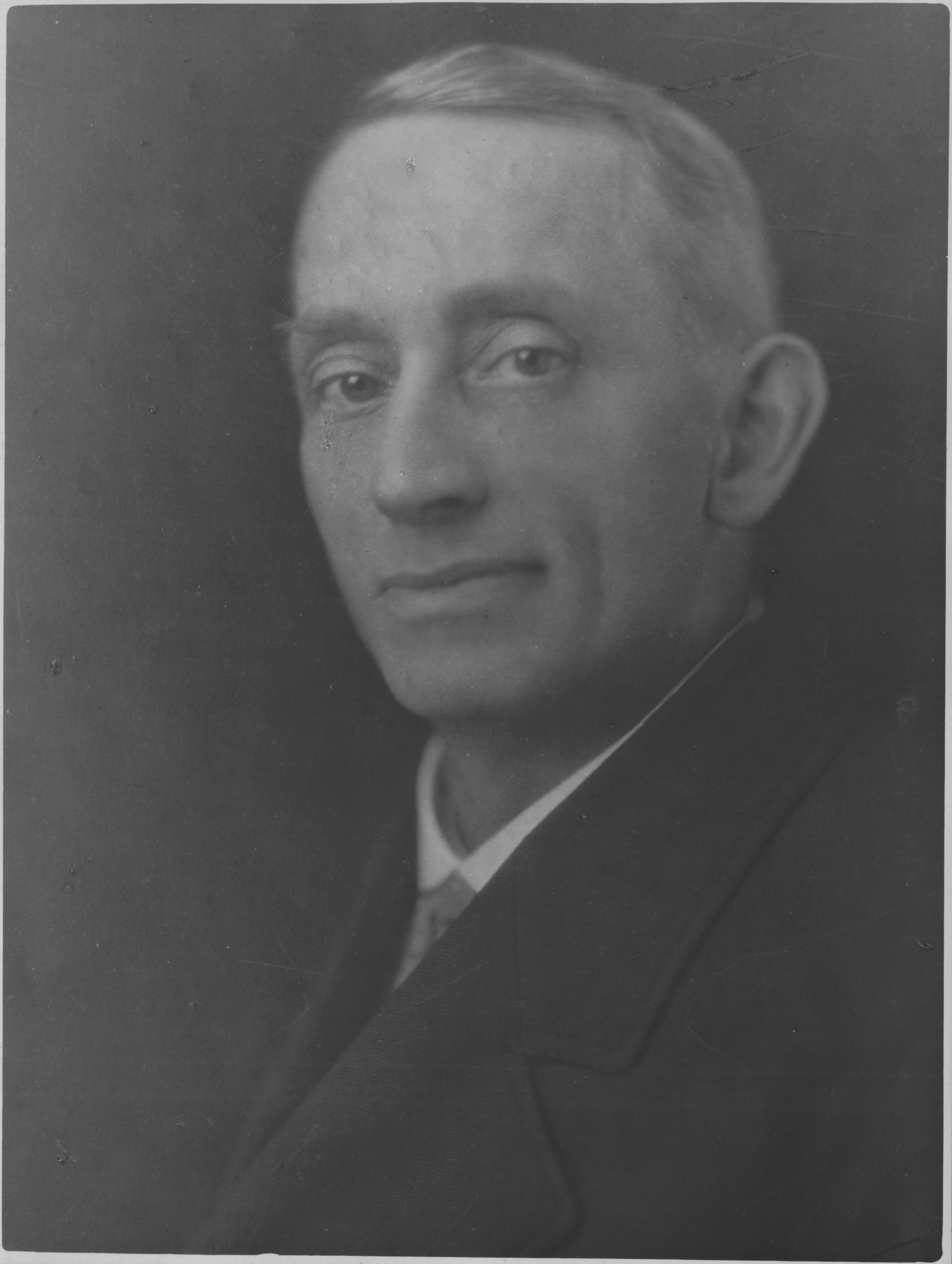
- Born: March 23, 1864; London, England
- Died: May 30, 1931 (aged 67)
- Education: St John's Wood Art School, London; Royal Academy of Arts (1887-1890)
- Known for: painter
- Spouse: Gertrude Maude Muriel (m. 1897)

Thomas William Fripp (March 23, 1864 – May 30, 1931) was an English-born Canadian artist who portrayed in watercolour the mountains of British Columbia and the Rockies.

== Biography ==
Fripp was the son of George Arthur Fripp, an artist, and Mary Percival. He was born in London, England. His great-grandfather Nicholas Pocock was a noted, marine artist, and founded the Royal Watercolour Society. Fripp studied at St John's Wood Art School and then continued his art studies in Italy in 1886. From 1887 to 1890, he learned from his father at the Royal Academy of Arts. He came to British Columbia in 1893, settling at Hatzic as a homesteader. After suffering an injury, Fripp moved to Vancouver to continue in a career as an artist.

Between 1900 and 1902, Fripp worked in a local photographic studio. He exhibited his art with the Vancouver Arts and Crafts Association in 1900. With Emily Carr and others, he established the British Columbia Society of Fine Arts, which received its charter in 1909, becoming the first chartered art society in the province. Fripp served seven years as the society's first president and served again as president from 1926 to 1931. He also exhibited with the Island Arts and Crafts Society in Victoria from 1912 to 1914 and from 1928 to 1930. In 1920, he became a member of the first executive of the British Columbia Art League. He was president of the Vancouver Sketch Club from 1920 to 1921.

He is known mainly for his watercolours of the Rocky Mountains and landscapes of the Pacific coast, but he also worked in oil and produced some portraits. He is praised especially for the depiction of light in the mountains.

His work is held in private and public collections, including the National Gallery of Canada, the Vancouver Art Gallery, the Art Gallery of Greater Victoria and the British Columbia Archives.

Fripp married Gertrude Maude Muriel in 1897; the couple had two sons and a daughter.

He died in Vancouver from bronchial illness at the age of 67.

His brother Charles Edwin was also a painter and lived for a time in Canada. His brother Robert McKay was an architect who practised in Vancouver.

== Legacy ==
Fripp had a retrospectives at the Vancouver Art Gallery (1952) and at the Art Gallery of Greater Victoria (1983).
