= Fripp =

Fripp may refer to:

- Fripp (novel), by Miles Tredinnick
- Fripp (surname)
- Fripp Island, South Carolina, U.S.
- "Fripp", song by the Catherine Wheel from Chrome

== See also ==
- Frip (disambiguation)
