= Charles Edwin Fripp =

English painter (1854–1906)

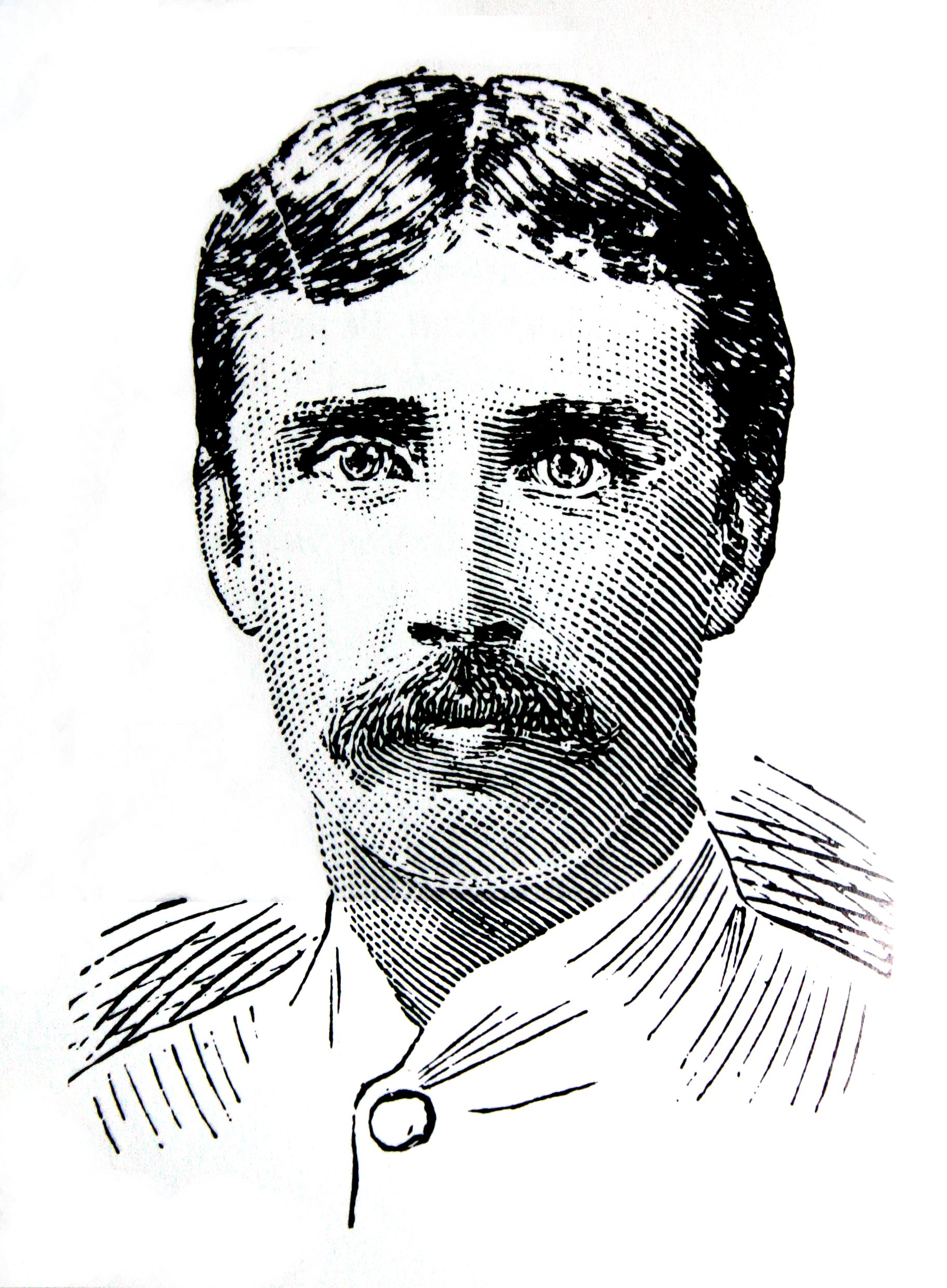
Charles Edwin Fripp

Charles Edwin Fripp (4 September 1854 – 30 September 1906) was an English painter and illustrator, and special war artist.

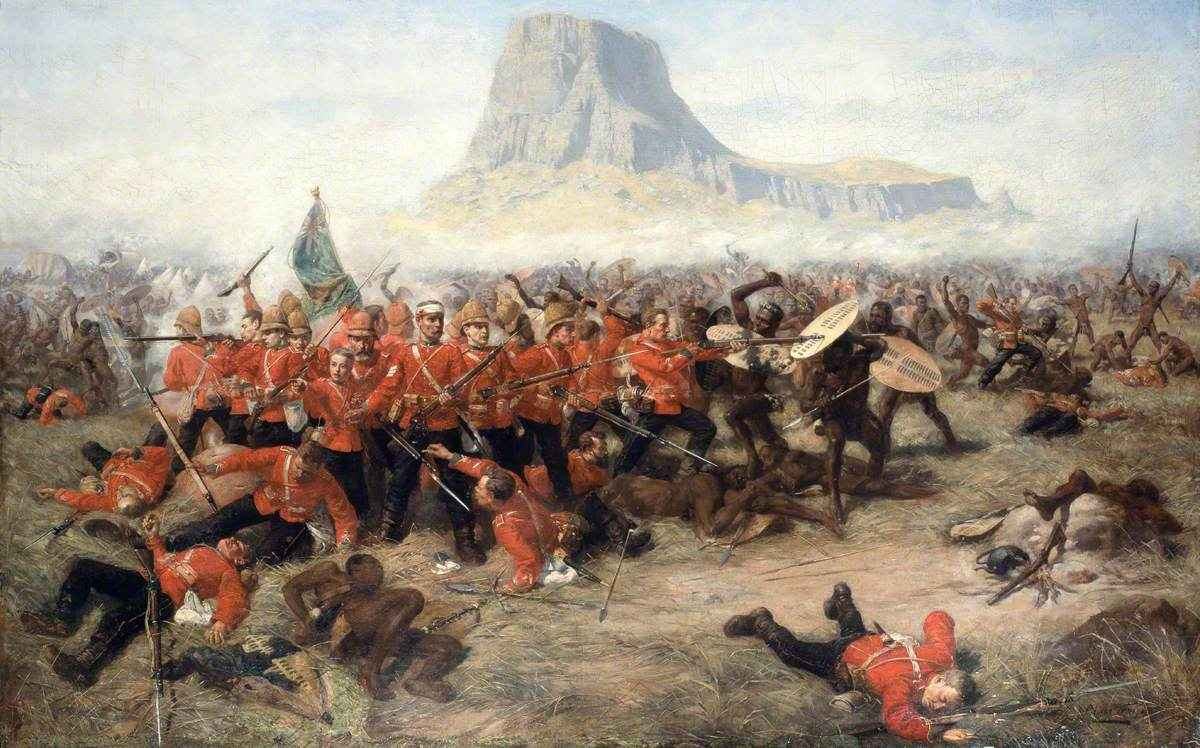
The Last Stand at Isandlwana, by Charles Edwin Fripp

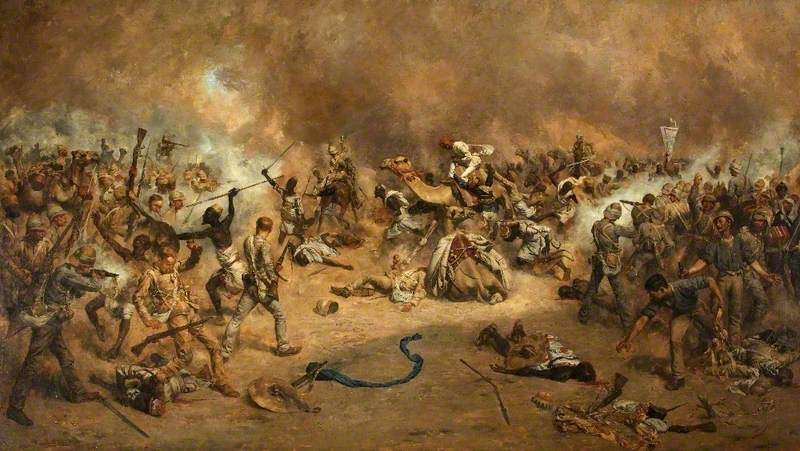
"Battle of Tofrek"

Charles Edwin Fripp was born in London, one of the twelve children of George Arthur Fripp (1822–1895), a landscape artist, and Mary Percival. His brother Thomas W. Fripp also became a watercolourist in Canada and his brother Robert McKay Fripp worked as an architect in Vancouver.

Fripp was an Associate of the Royal Watercolour Society. He painted mainly military subjects and worked as a special artist for The Graphic and The Daily Graphic during various wars in South Africa including the Kaffir War of 1878, the Zulu War, and the Boer War; he also covered the Sino-Japanese War of 1894–95 and the Philippines campaign of the Spanish–American War in 1899. He exhibited The Last Stand at Isandhula (sic) and The Attack on General Sir John McNeill’s Force near Suakim at the Royal Academy in 1885 and 1886 respectively. The former is now in the National Army Museum in London, England, while the latter is in the collection of the Duke of Edinburgh's Royal Regimental Museum at Salisbury, England, having been presented to the Royal Berkshire Regiment in January 1929.

In 1889, Fripp visited British Columbia on his way to Japan. During the 1890s, he lived in Enderby.

Fripp died on 30 September, 1906 in Montreal.

== Works By ==
- Fripp, Charles E., "Reminiscences of the Zulu War, 1879", Pall Mall Magazine, Vol. XX, January–April 1900, pp. 547–562.
