= Ancient Order of Froth Blowers =

Defunct British charity

A detail from an Ancient Order of Froth Blowers handkerchief. "Ale Fellow, Well Met!"

The Ancient Order of Froth Blowers was a humorous British charitable organisation "to foster the noble Art and gentle and healthy Pastime of froth blowing amongst Gentlemen of-leisure and ex-Soldiers". Running from 1924 to 1931, it was founded by Herbert Longdale Temple, an ex-soldier and curtain-merchant, initially to raise £100 (equal to £7,204 today) for the children's charities of the surgeon Sir Alfred Fripp. One of the Order's first meeting places was the Swan, Fittleworth, W. Sussex; the 'No. 0 Vat'.

== History ==
Temple founded the organisation in gratitude for life-saving stomach surgery by Fripp. Membership of this spoof order cost 5 shillings (equal to £18 today), each member receiving a pair of silver, enamelled cuff-links and a membership booklet and card entitling them to blow froth off any member's beer "and occasionally off non-members' beer provided they are not looking or are of a peaceful disposition". The motto was "Lubrication in Moderation".

The idea was to meet regularly in pubs or clubs ("Vats") to enjoy "beer, beef and baccy", possibly a memory of the Skeleton Army of the 1880s, and there to be fined for heinous sins, such as not wearing the cuff-links (dinners opened with the highest-ranking member, the "Senior Blower", giving the command "Gentlemen, shoot your linen" at which point all members showed their cuffs). All fines and residual membership fees to be sent to Sir Alfred and Lady Fripp for their "Wee Waifs" of the East End of London.

In late 1925, the editor of The Sporting Times started to publish articles on the Order's gatherings, and the idea took hold of the public imagination. The now-retired Fripp travelled around the country as guest speaker at over 200 of these Vats, and thousands clamoured to join: men ("Blowers"), women ("Fairy Belles"), their children and their dogs ("Faithful Bow-Wows") were all enrolled. Those who enrolled others received titles such as Blaster (25 members recruited), Tornado (100), up to Grand Typhoon (1000).

For five years the Froth Blowers extolled Britishness and "Lubrication in Moderation". Their song The More We Are Together, an adaptation of Oh du lieber Augustin specially written by the pseudonymous Irving King, was heard everywhere.

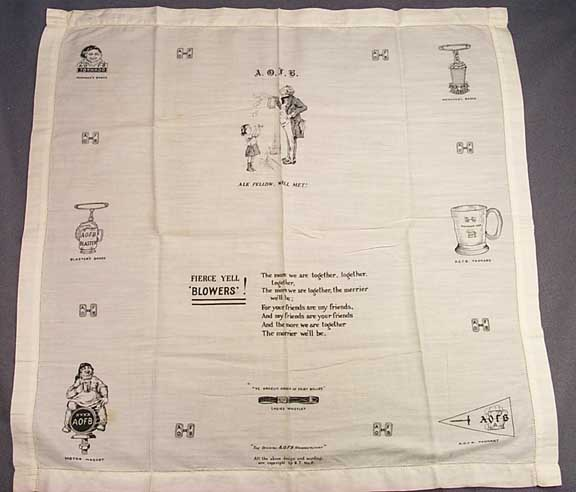
An Ancient Order of Froth Blowers handkerchief.

A detail from the handkerchief – the "Motor Mascot".

A pair of Ancient Order of Froth Blower cufflinks.

The more we are together, together, together
The more we are together
The merrier we'll be.
For your friends are my friends
And my friends are your friends,
And the more we are together
The merrier we'll be.

By late 1928, 700,000 had joined, raising over £100,000 (equal to £7,610,432 today) for hospital cots, outings to the country, invalid children, etc. It endowed 40 hospital cots, funded holidays for thousands of needy children, and in 1929 established a roof garden for mothers and children on the Marylebone Housing Association's first block of slum clearance flats.

A plaque designed by artist and illustrator Henry Charles Innes Fripp, cousin of Arthur Fripp, was created to accompany donations of £500 (about £20,000 in today's money) to fund the costs of 50 children's hospital beds.

Their popularity was particularly upsetting to the Temperance activists who believed that it was alcohol which caused the "wee waifs'" suffering; not something a doctor and surgeon-to-the-King should be sponsoring. In 1927, Walter Greville of the Good Templars described it as "the latest recruited ally of the liquor trade", saying that "for ridiculous vulgarity and foolish methods it took the first prize". Sir George Hunter, speaking for the Fellowship of Freedom and Reform in 1929, called the Froth Blowers "a disgrace to the country".

Nevertheless, the Lord Chancellor, Viscount Hailsham, described it as "a great charitable organisation", and when Fripp died in 1930 his Times obituary said of the Froth Blowers, "These, by their innocent mirth, assisted by a catchy tune, have contributed largely to charities, and have entertained and brightened the lives of innumerable children".

The movement came to a natural end shortly after Fripp's death, when The Sporting Times folded and finally Bert Temple died in 1931. In that year the Ancient Order of Froth Blowers Limited went into voluntary liquidation. Residual money was used by Lady Fripp and her family to fund "Heartsease", a Girl Guide retreat in the grounds of the West Wickham Home of Recovery for Children with Heart Disease, a hospital which had been partially funded by Froth Blower gifts in 1927. The Ancient Order of Froth Blowers Girl Guide and Boy Scout Charity Limited still administers this site.

== Quote from the AOFB handbook ==
"A sociable and law-abiding fraternity of absorptive Britons who sedately consume and quietly enjoy with commendable regularity and frequention the truly British malted beverage as did their forbears and as Britons ever will, and be damned to all pussyfoot hornswogglers from overseas and including low brows, teetotalers and MPs and not excluding nosey parkers, mock religious busy bodies and suburban fool hens all of which are structurally solid bone from the chin up".

== Cultural references ==
John Betjeman's poem The Varsity Students' Rag contains the line "I started a rag in Putney at our Froth-Blowers' branch down there".

In Dorothy Sayers's story The Adventurous Exploit of the Cave of Ali Baba, Lord Peter Wimsey describes his safe as "the ordinary strong-room, where I keep my cash and Froth Blower's cuff-links and all that." In her novel Unnatural Death, Lord Peter assures a nurse that "I haven't come to sell you soap or gramophones, or to borrow money or enrol you in the Ancient Froth-blowers or anything charitable". In her novel The Unpleasantness at the Bellona Club, Lord Peter makes a facetious reference to "the Froth Blowers' Anthem."

The mercenary group led by Mike Hoare in an attempted 1981 coup of the Seychelles disguised itself as a drinking party calling itself The Ancient Order of Froth Blowers.

In The Female of the Species by Sapper, the anthem is used as a means of identification by Bulldog Drummond and his chums.
