= Robert McKay Fripp =

English architect (1858–1917)

Robert McKay Fripp (December 16, 1858 – December 16, 1917) was an English-born architect who practised in Canada, the United States, Australia and New Zealand.

== Biography ==
Fripp was born on December 16, 1858, in Clifton, to painter George Arthur Fripp and Mary Percival. He articled as an architect in Berkshire. He was strongly influenced by the Arts and Crafts movement as reflected in the work of Richard Norman Shaw and William Morris. He continued his studies at the Royal College of Art and the British Museum and went on to work with Sir Horace Jones in London.

Fripp went to Australia in 1880, working in architectural offices in Adelaide, Melbourne and Sydney. In the following year, he went to New Zealand, practising in Auckland. In 1887, he married Christina Nichol there. In 1888, he left for North America, settling in Vancouver. He returned to New Zealand from 1896 to 1898, then went back to Vancouver. In 1901, he became a fellow of the Royal Institute of British Architects and, in 1906, was certified as an architect in California, practising for a time in Los Angeles. He returned to Vancouver in 1908.

While in New Zealand during the 1880s, Fripp served as secretary of the Auckland Society of Arts and introduced architecture classes.

Besides Arts and Crafts design, Fripp also built houses in the style of California architects Greene and Greene.

In 1910, Fripp became a fellow of the Royal Society of Arts. He was also president of the Canadian Handicrafts Guild in Vancouver.

He died on December 16, 1917, aged 59, in Vancouver. His brothers Thomas and Charles were both artists who spent time in British Columbia.
