= George Arthur Fripp =

English painter (1813–1896)

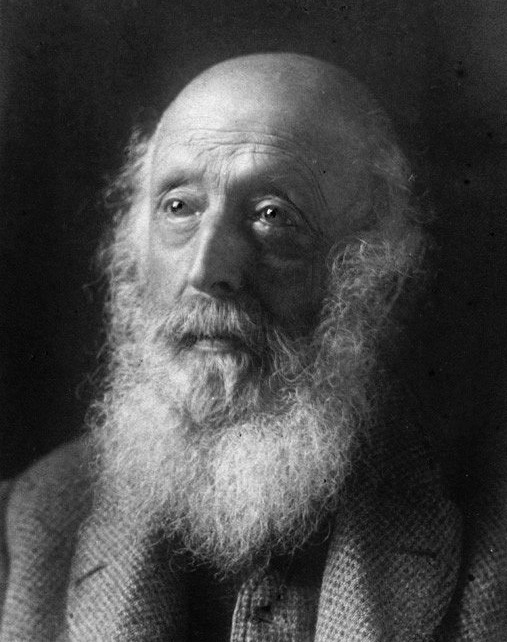
Fripp in the 1890s

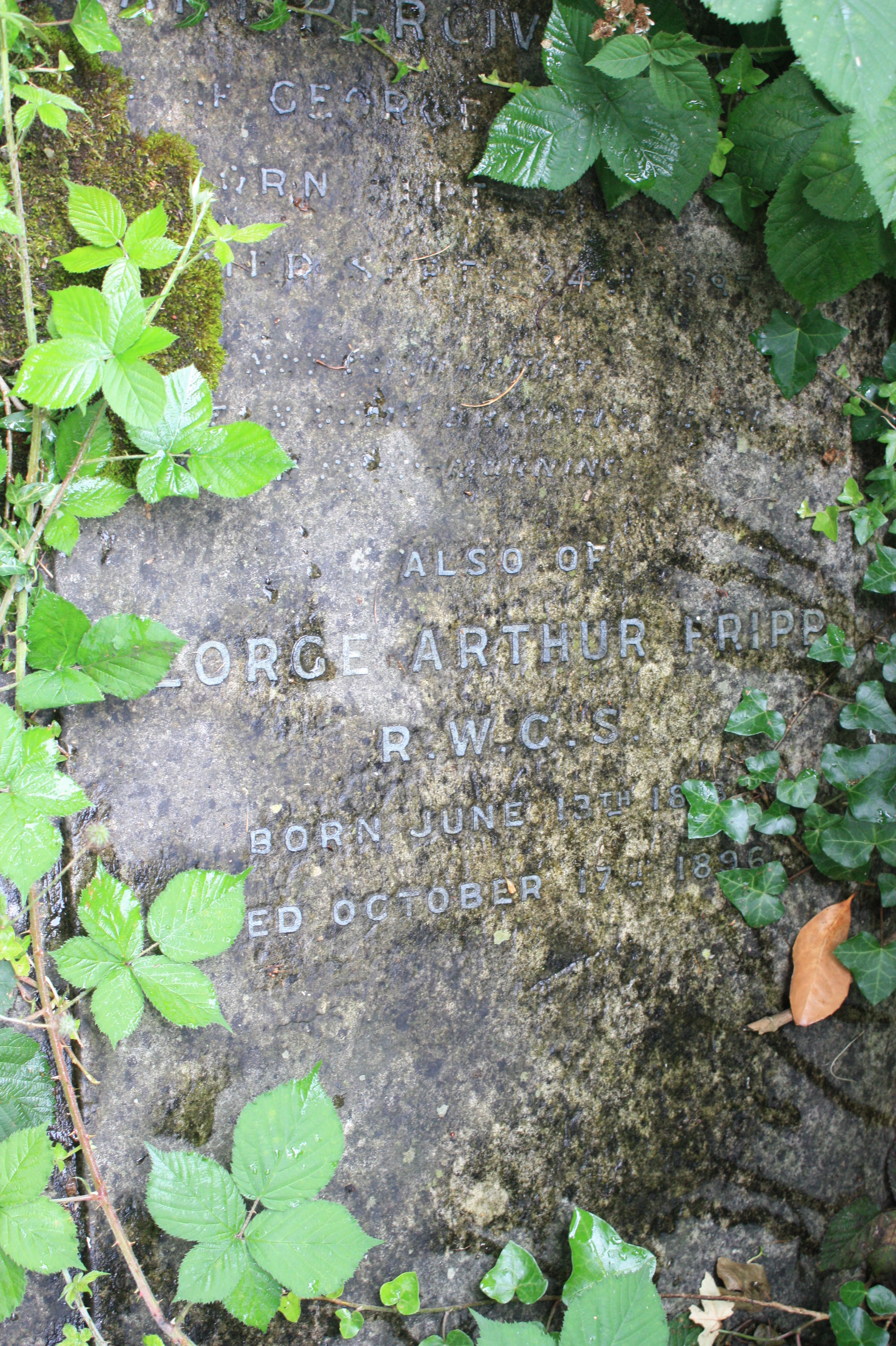
The grave of George Arthur Fripp, Highgate Cemetery, London

George Arthur Fripp RWS (13 June 1813 – 17 October 1896) was a British watercolourist.

== Life ==
Fripp was born on 13 June 1813, in Bristol, and educated in Bristol, Birmingham and Leamington. He was a grandson of Nicholas Pocock, a brother of Alfred Downing Fripp and an uncle of Henry Charles Innes Fripp.

He had lessons in oil painting from James Baker Pyne and first exhibited at the Bristol Society of Artists in 1832. In 1834 he accompanied the Bristol artist William James Müller on a sketching tour of Europe, which produced works he later exhibited at the Royal Academy from 1838.

In 1841, he exhibited at the Old Watercolour Society, becoming an associate that year, a full member in 1845, and secretary from 1848 to 1854. He became well known for his watercolours, mostly scenic British views.

He married Mary Percival in 1846. Two of their twelve children also became artists: Charles Edwin Fripp an artist-reporter for The Graphic, and Thomas Fripp, a watercolourist in Canada. Another son, Robert, became an architect

Fripp died in Hampstead, on 17 October 1896, aged 83. He is buried in the eastern section of Highgate Cemetery in north London. The grave lies in the north-east section close to the vault of his friend Edwin Wilkins Field and the grave of George Eliot, just south of George Holyoake. It is a flat stone slab at ground level and hard to locate in the overgrown areas off the main paths.

== Gallery ==
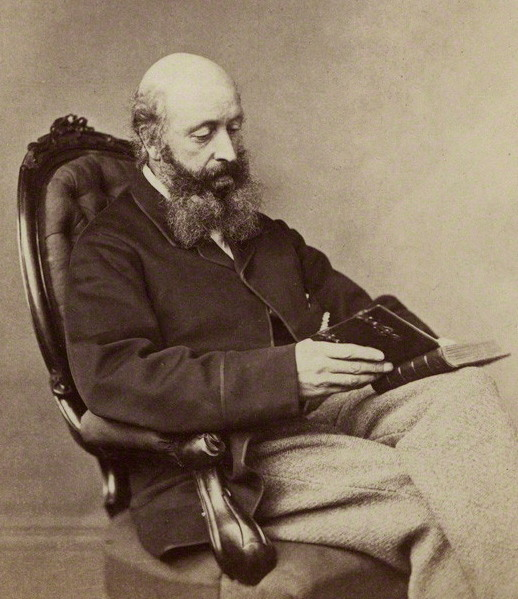
George Arthur Fripp in the 1860s

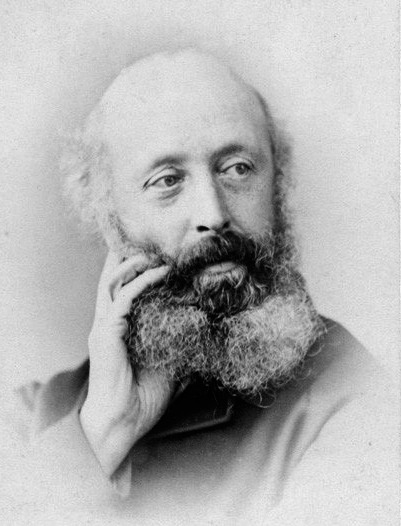
George Arthur Fripp in the 1860s

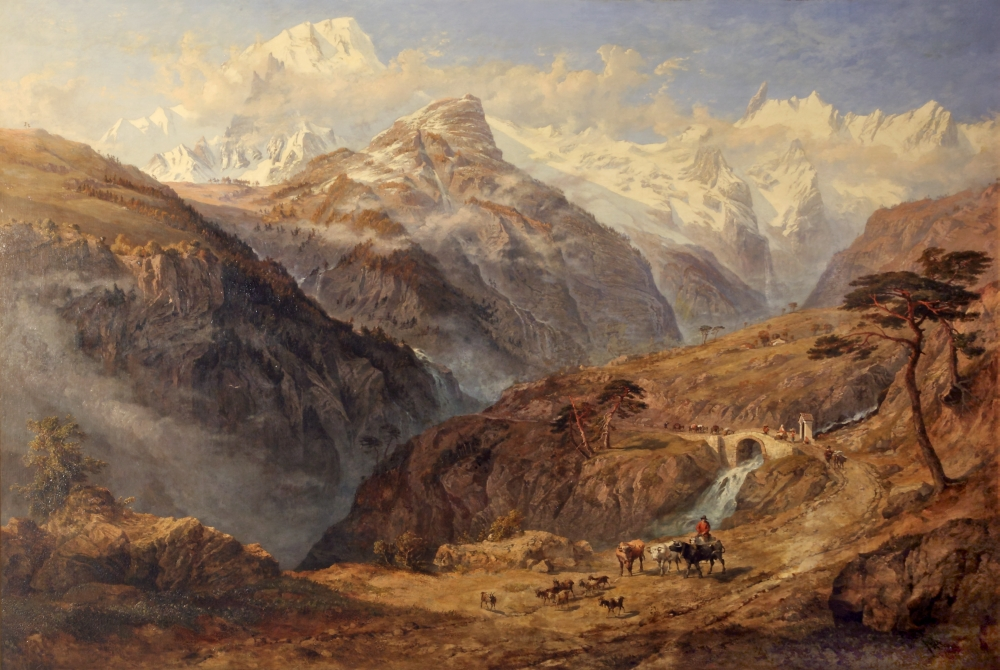
Mont Blanc, from near Cormayeur, Vallé d'Aoste (1848)

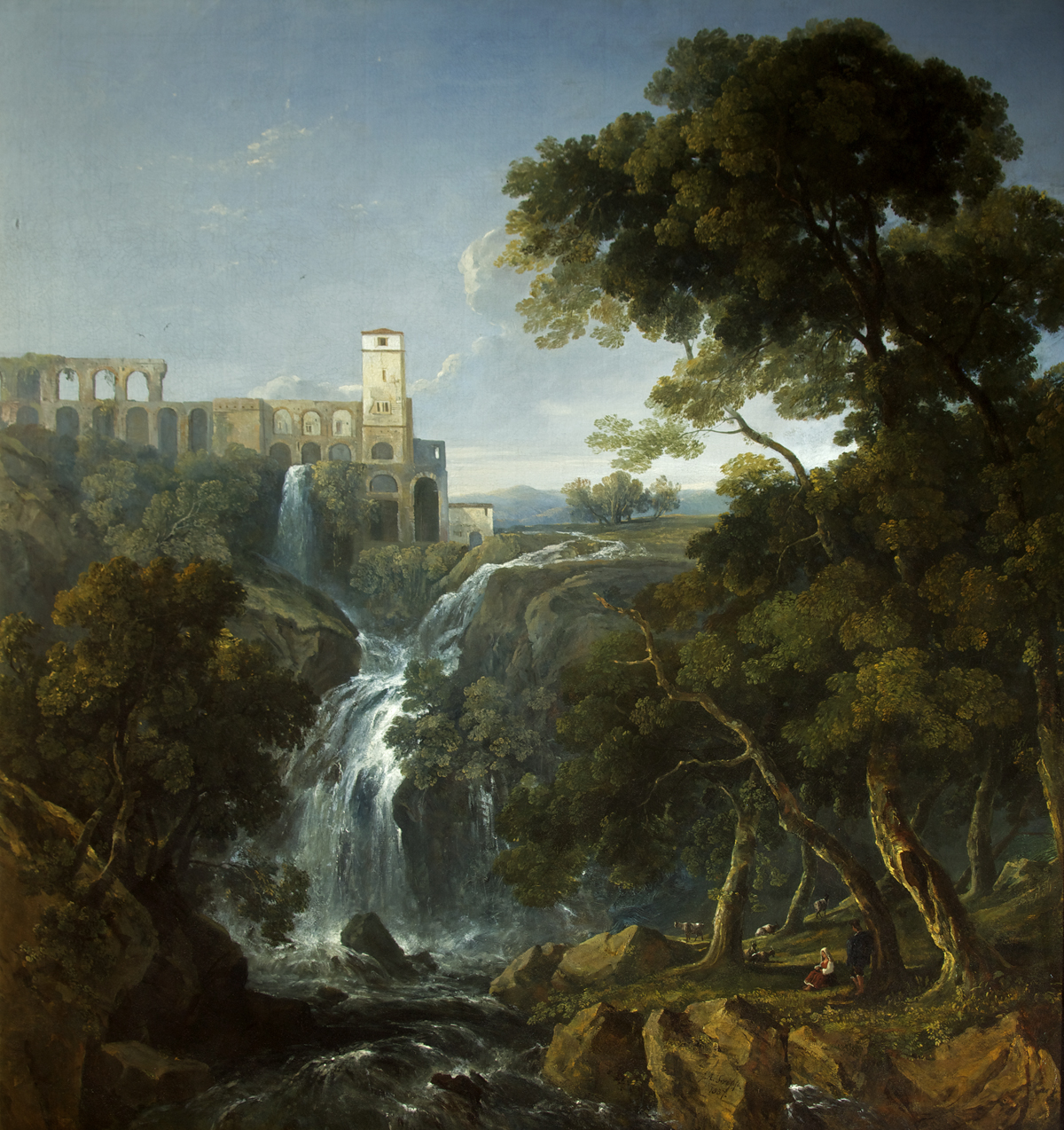
Tivoli (1837)

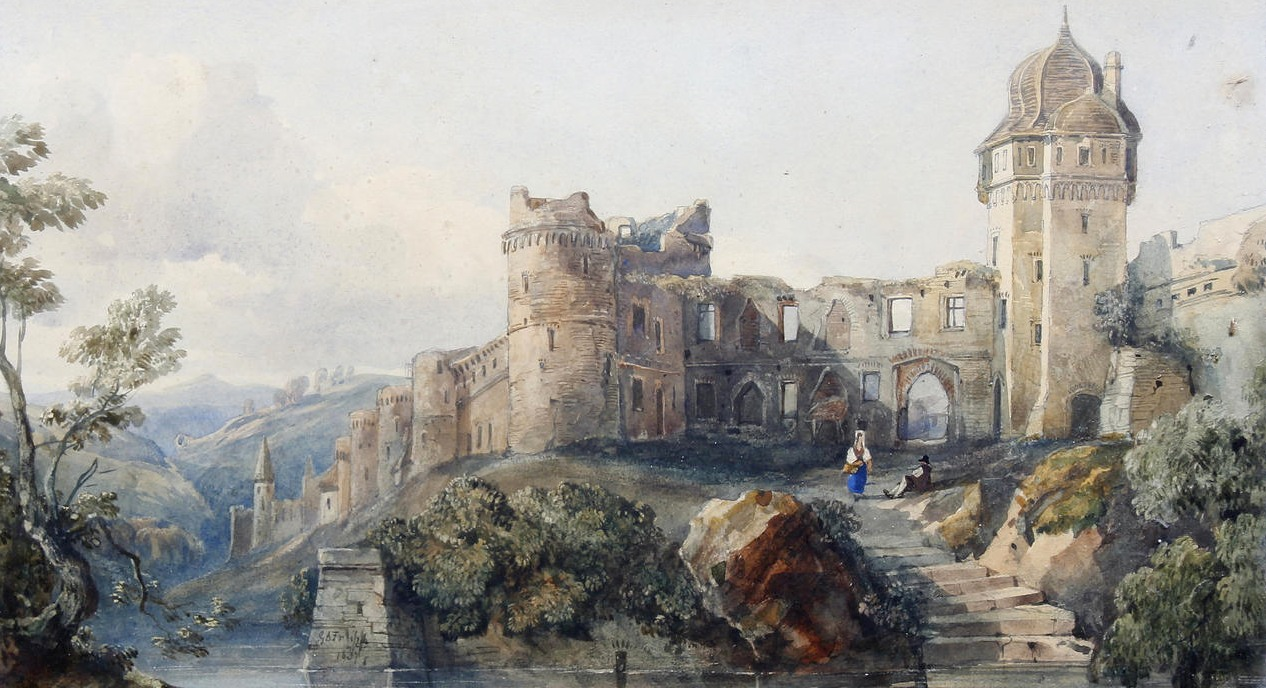
Castle ruins by a river (1830s)

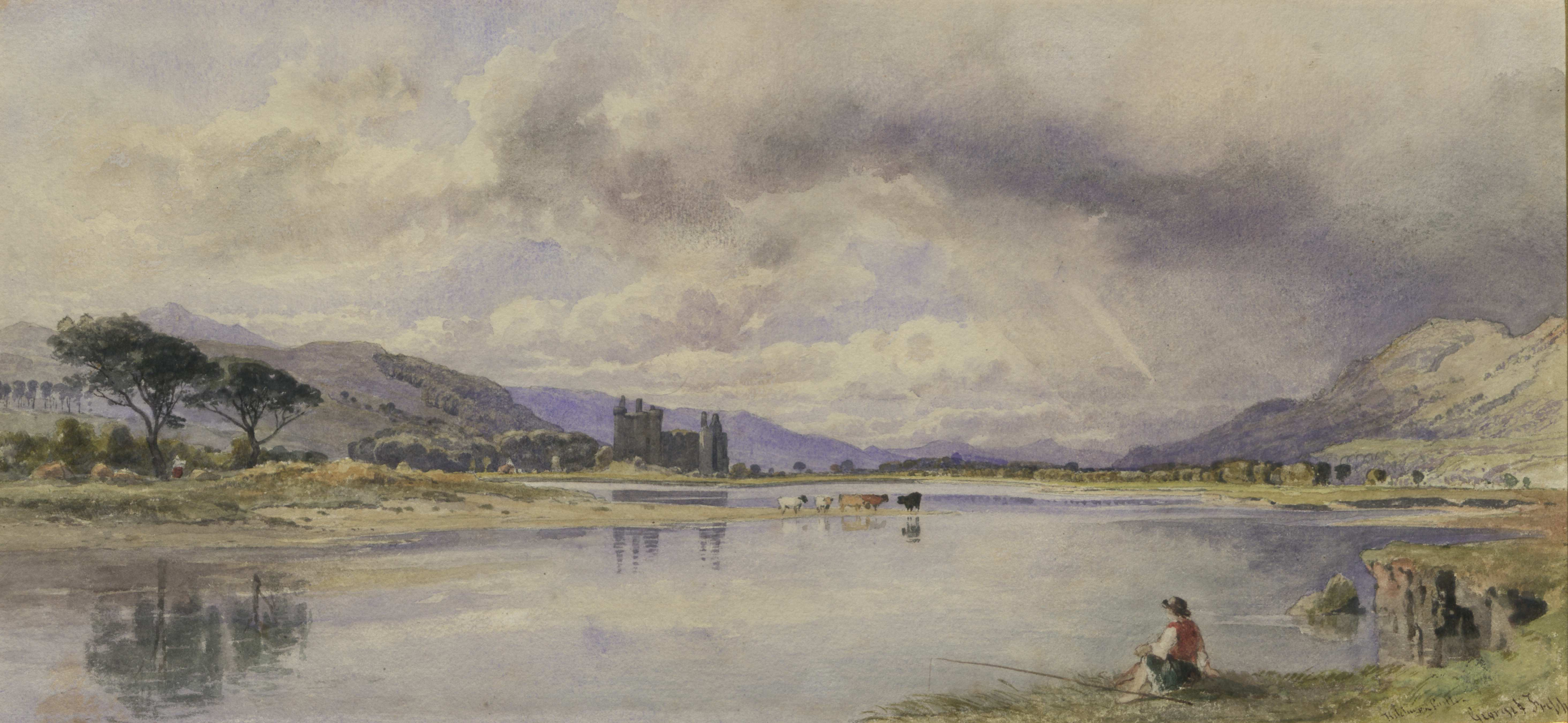
Kilchurn Castle - Loch Awe, Aberdeen Archives, Gallery & Museums Collection
