= Henry Pering Pellew Crease =

British judge and politician (1823–1905)

Sir Henry Pering Pellew Crease
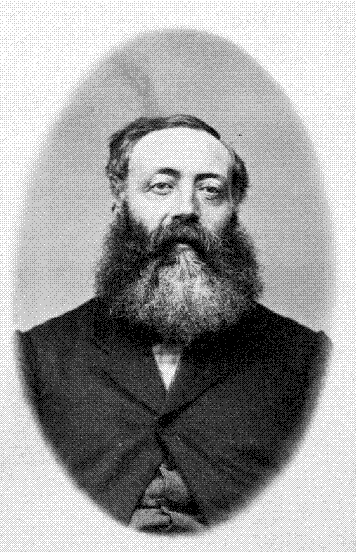

Supreme Court of British Columbia
- In office 13 May 1870 – 20 January 1896
- Appointed by: Anthony Musgrave

Attorney General of British Columbia
- In office 15 October 1861 – 13 May 1870
- Appointed by: James Douglas
- Preceded by: George Hunter Cary
- Succeeded by: George Phillippo

Personal details
- Born: 20 August 1823 Ince Castle, Cornwall, England
- Died: 27 November 1905 (aged 82) Victoria, British Columbia, Canada
- Spouse: Sarah Crease née Lindley
- Children: 6
- Education: Mount Radford School
- Alma mater: Clare College, Cambridge
- Profession: lawyer

Sir Henry Pering Pellew Crease (20 August 1823 – 27 November 1905) was a British lawyer, judge, and politician, in the colonies of Vancouver Island and British Columbia. He was the first Attorney General of the united Colony of British Columbia, and sat on its Supreme Court for 26 years.

== Early life ==
Crease was born at Ince Castle, in Cornwall, the son of a Royal Navy captain. He attended Mount Radford School in Exeter, where he was a contemporary of Joseph Trutch. He earned his BA from Clare College, Cambridge and then studied law at the Middle Temple. Though called to the bar in June 1849, he did not immediately pursue his career in law. Instead he joined his parents in an unsuccessful canal building endeavour in Upper Canada. After only a short turn as a barrister on his return to England, he took a job in Cornwall managing a tin mine owned by Great Wheal Vor United Mines, which ended with his employer suing him.

By the time Crease left again for Canada in April 1858, he had married Sarah Lindley and had three young daughters, Susan, Mary, and Barbara. Sarah was the daughter of the famous botanist, John Lindley. She was also a talented scientific illustrator and artist, and would go on to create many drawings and watercolours of early BC. Unable to find work in Toronto, Henry decided to try his luck in Victoria, and arrived there in December.

== Lawyer and politician ==
Upon his arrival in Victoria, Crease was admitted as a barrister to the courts of Vancouver Island and British Columbia, and became thereby the first lawyer qualified to practice in both jurisdictions. Crease opened a practice in Victoria and travelled with Supreme Court Judge Matthew Baillie Begbie on his first circuit of the frontier in the midst of the Gold Rush.

Crease, his wife, and his children, became friends of Colonel Richard Clement Moody, Kt., who was the founder and the first Lieutenant-Governor of British Columbia, and with the officers of Moody's Royal Engineers, Columbia Detachment. Like Moody, Crease remained nostalgic for the ethnic traditions of Britain and opposed the mercantile Hudson's Bay Company's control over the new colony.

In 1860 Crease was elected to the Vancouver Island House of Assembly as an independent member for Victoria. However, he was criticised by the British Colonist (which was run by Amor de Cosmos) for his sympathy with the colonial government, which, the following year, appointed Crease Attorney-General of British Columbia, for which Crease resigned his seat in the Assembly. Crease enacted hundreds of laws in between his legal tours, which regulated the colony's utilisation of its natural resources, including land and gold mining, under principles of free trade.

Crease on the lawn of Pentrelew, his home in Victoria

The Crease family's home in New Westminster was Ince Cottage, on Sapperton Road, that was named after the castle that belonged to Henry's mother's family in England. He sent his sons to Haileybury College in England for their schooling, and was dismayed to note that, "While you and I talk of the Old Country as 'Home,' all our children call Canada 'home'".

When the colonies were joined in 1866 Crease became the first Attorney General of the new united colony. In 1868 he moved to the new colony's new capital of Victoria, where he built a new home, Pentrelew, on Fort Street. In Victoria, as in New Westminster, Crease participated in community organisations: the Church of England, Royal Colonial Institute, and the Law Society of British Columbia, of which he was a co-founder. He was on the board of the Colonial Securities Company, and was a lieutenant in the Seymour Artillery Company.

The British Columbia government, including Crease, did not negotiate treaties with the native Indians. In the legislature in 1870, Crease objected to discussion of the native Indians because they "do get word of what's going on". Crease stated that "our policy has been, let the Indians alone".

== British Columbia Supreme Court ==
In 1870 he was appointed a judge of the Supreme Court of British Columbia and retired from his government post. Crease was suspicious of both Canadian Confederation because it threatened greater government control and threatened local preferences. "I believe that England is sick of her Colonies," he wrote, "and to be a Colonist, whatever your POSITION & CHARACTER when at Home – is to lose Caste the moment you become a bona fide settler." Crease nevertheless was chosen to prepare for Confederation as the chair of the Royal Commission for the Revision of Laws of BC.

After British Columbia had become a province of Canada in 1871, Crease campaigned for judicial independence, including the right of judges to live outside their districts. In 1881 the British Columbia Supreme Court, including Crease, ruled in the Thrasher case that the province's attempts to regulate judges were unconstitutional. Their decision was overturned two years later by the Supreme Court of Canada.

In 1882, Crease presided over the trial of John Hall, who owned most of the land on Burrard Inlet that now makes up the community of Belcarra, British Columbia, who was accused of murdering his mother-in-law. Crease had once employed Hall as his agent in a dispute with trespassers who illegally logged on land he and his friend Robert Burnaby owned near Hall's Ranch. Hall was found guilty of manslaughter: and his land was signed over to his attorney to pay for his defence.

In 1884, Crease overturned the Chinese Population Regulation Bill, which imposed an annual tax of ten dollars on each Chinese resident in Canada who was over the age of ten years. He ruled that the provincial government had acted beyond its constitutional authority in passing the act, which was within only federal powers of taxation. The next year, as a member of the Royal Commission on Chinese Immigration, Crease wrote that "The real fact is, and the more completely it is recognized the better, that we cannot do without a certain number of Chinese for manual labour and for domestic servants," but warned that Chinese immigrants "will never assimilate with the Anglo-Saxon race, nor is it desirable that they should … They do not regard British Columbia as their home and when they die send their bones home to be buried in China."

By sitting on several Royal commissions, the Exchequer Court of Canada, and the British Columbia Supreme Court, Crease remained an influential figure after his defeat in the Thrasher case. However, federal Justice Minister Sir Charles Hibbert Tupper was not impressed with Crease's judgment and advocated Crease's retirement in a letter to British Columbia Supreme Court Chief Justice Theodore Davie. Crease retired in January 1896, and on 23 January 1896 Crease was knighted. He died in 1905 and was buried at Ross Bay Cemetery in Victoria.

== Sources ==
- J. B. Kerr, "Crease, Henry Pering Pellew" in Biographical Dictionary of Well-known British Columbians: with a historical sketch (Vancouver: Kerr & Begg, 1890) p. 133
