= Alfred Downing Fripp (surgeon) =

British surgeon

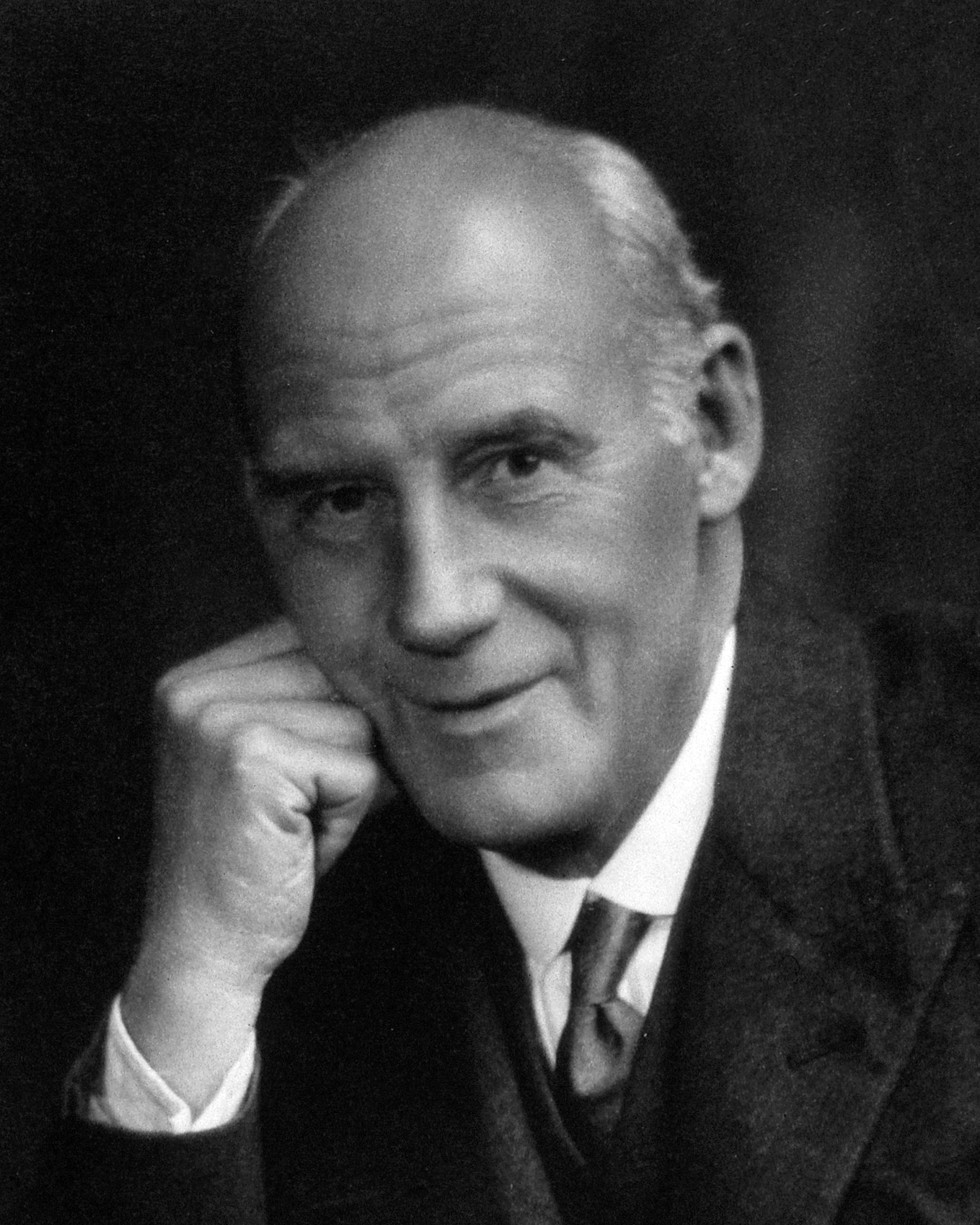
Alfred Downing Fripp

Sir Alfred Downing Fripp KCVO (12 September 1865 – 25 February 1930) was a British surgeon. He was Honorary Surgeon to His Majesty in the Medical Households of King Edward VII and King George V. He is also known for his contribution to the development of field hospitals during the Second Boer War.

== Early life ==
Fripp was born in Blandford Forum, England in 1865 to the artist Alfred Downing Fripp and Eliza Bannister Roe. His father's first wife, Anne Dalton Allies, was a cousin of Canon John Neale Dalton, tutor to Prince Albert Victor and Prince George and godfather to Fripp. Anne died in 1850 after giving birth to Fripp's half-sister, Annie. Fripp had another sister, Jeanie (Edith Jane), and a brother, Rex (Reginald). Annie married Edward Penny, who became physician to Marlborough College. Rex, a pupil of the school, died aged eighteen in 1895; their parents died in the same bronchial epidemic. Jeanie had gained a 'Senior Optime' in mathematics at Girton College in 1886 and soon after married William Hale-White, son of Mark Rutherford. Hale-White, a physician, and Fripp, a surgeon, were to work at Guy's Hospital together for over thirty years.

== Royal Patronage ==
In 1883, on a visit to Cambridge to visit his sister, Fripp called on his godfather, John Neale Dalton, at Trinity College, where Neale Dalton was acting as chaperone to Prince Albert Victor to whom Fripp was introduced. A year later he spent a few days at Cambridge in Prince "Eddy's" company. Six years passed in medical studies, sporting activities and theatre-going, when he accepted a two-week job as a locum tenens for William Jalland, a Guy's Hospital alumnus, in York. As Prince Eddy was stationed in the area and had to be attended to, they met up again. The Prince insisted that he accompany him to Royal Deeside where Fripp became an accepted, if unofficial, doctor-in-residence to the Prince and other members of the Royal Family. Fripp was sent with Eddy on a Royal Tour to South Wales with only the Prince's equerry, George Holford, in attendance. At the age of twenty-four, and still with exams to pass, he had the seal of Royal approval.

When Prince Albert Victor – Fripp's "hope of hopes" – died in the flu epidemic of 1892, Fripp thought his royal days were over, but four years later Edward VII, then the Prince of Wales, made him his Surgeon-in-Ordinary. With Holford's help and his own persistence, he persuaded Edward to preside over the Guy's Hospital Fund, ensuring the financial security of the Hospital, before he had been given a post there. However, after this Cooper Perry and Cosmo Bonsor persuaded the Board to create an assistant surgeon post for him. This, and his private practice in his brother-in-law's house in Harley Street, established him as a doctor, teacher and surgeon. A year later, just before his marriage, he set up as a consultant in his own home, 19 Portland Place. For the next 30 years aristocrats, plutocrats and famous stage personalities were frequent visitors - most as patients and friends.

== Marriage ==
On 8 June 1898, Alfred Fripp married Margaret Scott Haywood (1880–1965), daughter of Thomas Haywood of Woodhatch House, Reigate. His godfather officiated and George Holford was best man. The Fripps were to have five children: Alfred Thomas Fripp (1899–1995); Betty Agnes Fripp (1904–1975); Margaret Cicely Fripp (1908–1972); Venetia Sybil Fripp (1911–1993); and Reginald Charles Fripp (1915–1982).

The Fripps were halfway through their honeymoon – bicycle touring in Dorset and France – when they had to rush back to London so that Fripp could attend the Prince of Wales. He had damaged his knee in a fall at Waddesdon Manor and required Fripp to accompany him to Cowes Regatta. The Fripps were found a cottage near Osborne House where they befriended Guglielmo Marconi who was demonstrating his new telegraph machine to Queen Victoria. Along with the Prince of Wales and Sir James Reid, Fripp was one of the first people to send an official message using Marconi's invention.

== Boer War ==
When, in late-1899, it was obvious that the Boer War was not going to be "over by Christmas", the yeomanry of the shires were asked to enlist in order to augment the regular army – who were being killed more by an enteric epidemic than by Boer snipers. Georgiana Curzon decided to raise money to set up Imperial Yeomanry Hospitals, the first and biggest being at Deelfontein. Knowing Fripp socially – at places like Warwick Castle, where he was often a guest of Daisy Greville, Countess of Warwick and her husband – she and her committee (mainly composed of society ladies) selected Fripp to turn an empty bit of the Karoo, chosen by Frederick Roberts, 1st Earl Roberts, into an army hospital for 500 yeomanry patients.

With generous funding from the committee and the acquiescence of the military commander, Arthur Sloggett, Fripp transformed the idea of how to run a base hospital: despite being scoffed for doing it, he took over five times as many nurses as the Royal Army Medical Corps (RAMC) provided for a similar number of patients; he took more orderlies and assistants (including his wife who, leaving their son with her mother, travelled with him – and was later rewarded with a Royal Red Cross medal for keeping the men supplied with cigarettes and other such 'comforts'); and he took a physician, Washbourn, a dental expert, Newland-Pedley – both from Guy's – and an X-ray specialist, Hall-Edwards from Birmingham: three such specialists had never been taken to war before. He even took a masseuse who, he claimed, was more useful than he and his three experts put together. Having said all this, in his answers to questions put to him by members of the Royal Enquiry into the War in South Africa, he claimed that the modern steam sterilising unit he had had shipped from England saved more lives than medical expertise – and was more necessary than the most up-to-date medical implements.

The success of this hospital was such a contrast to the RAMC. hospitals – where men were dying in squalor – that when the MP, William Burdett-Coutts, reported the facts to Parliament and The Times, there was public outrage. However, Fripp had already returned with ideas of his own for the reform of the Army Medical Service. He sought out Arthur Balfour, who sent Fripp to speak to the newly appointed secretary of state for war, St John Brodrick, 1st Earl of Midleton, and between them they chose a committee, headed by Brodrick, to work out the details of reform along Fripp's lines. One of their choices was Alfred Keogh whom Brodrick appointed as Chairman of the working Committee; others were Cooper Perry of Guy's and Sir Frederick Treves. King Edward made sure his Government put the committee's recommendations into practice before the end of his reign, but knighted Fripp for his part in instigating the reforms much earlier – on 18 July 1903; at 37, the youngest doctor to receive this title.

At the outbreak of the Great War, Sloggett was in charge of the RAMC but, when the task immediately proved to be too much for one man, Keogh was brought out of retirement to share the duties. Fripp's practical solutions to problems at Deelfontein and his detailed plans for the RAMC's reform were put into practice by the two army medical officers who knew most about them. Years later, Brodrick wrote, "(I was) chief guest to a dinner given to celebrate the splendid service of the corps in the Great War. I felt that their most deserving guests would have been King Edward and Sir Alfred Fripp.". At the time, Fripp's part in the success of the IYH was deliberately left out of Lady Howe's 3-volume report because he had infuriated her by suggesting to the commission of enquiry that some of the statistics in her first Volume were 'cooked'. He was never to receive full acknowledgement for this life-saving work.

== 1914–1918 ==
At the beginning of World War I, Fripp was employed by the War Office at Royal Naval Dockyard Rosyth as Consulting Surgeon to the Navy. Later he described what he had seen. After one year, the government decided that employing civilian experts was an unnecessary expense, so Fripp returned to voluntary surgical and advisory work in London hospitals set up by his wealthy friends in their palatial houses. For example, he helped George Holford to turn his Dorchester House in Park Lane into a hospital for officers, and then worked there.

A few months before the War ended, Fripp became embroiled in the Noel Pemberton Billing affair. Billing published an article saying that the dancing of Maud Allan as Salome was part of a plot to enable Germany to blackmail all those (47,000, according to Billing) establishment and society people who enjoyed watching lesbian dancing from a homosexual's play – or other such deviant pleasures. She sued him for libel in May 1918, and a bizarre court case ensued during which Billing implied that Margot Asquith, who employed a German governess and was a devotee of Allan's provocative act, was a danger to the security of the State. Fripp, for patriotic or personal reasons, agreed to attest that he knew of people at court who might be a danger to security, but Judge Charles Darling, 1st Baron Darling refused to allow Fripp to answer any of the questions put to him. Billing won his case.

Before the war ended, Fripp had invited David Alfred Thomas, 1st Viscount Rhondda and Cooper Perry to his house to discuss the setting-up of a Ministry of Health. Lord Rhondda's death a few months later meant that this meeting lost its significance.

== Charity ==
Fripp raised a lot of money, not only for Guy's Hospital — for whom he raised £20,000 from his patients in 1925 and £50,000 from Gilbert Wills, 1st Baron Dulverton in 1926 — but also for children's charities. His principal charity was the Invalid Children's Aid Association (ICCA). He founded the Hackney branch of the ICCA in 1906 and raised £10,000 for it, and was dedicated in his oversight of the Branch.

In 1924, he performed life-prolonging abdominal surgery on a patient called Bert Temple. Temple formed Ye Ancient Order of Froth Blowers (AOFB), aiming to raise £100 from life-membership fees (5/-) and fines at meetings. This target was reached in one year. Then, in 1926, the Sporting Times advertised it and it took off. In four years Fripp, who was 'No. 1' to Bert's 'No.0', attended over 200 AOFB functions and received in excess of £100,000 from the 688,000 Froth Blowers who had joined by 1930. His participation made Fripp a target of disapproval from the temperance movement.

== Last years ==
George Holford died in 1926 and the only non-family member he left money to was Fripp, his friend of thirty-six years. As this was the considerable sum of £5,000, Fripp had a house designed for him in Lulworth, Dorset, by Edwin Lutyens and named it 'Weston' after Holford's country house, Westonbirt. Fripp was made a governor of Guy's Hospital in appreciation of everything he had done for it, so was busy in retirement attending meetings of the Hospital and the AOFB. In early 1930 he contracted nephritis and died on 25 February. He was buried in Lulworth churchyard. On 4 March a memorial service was held in St Martin-in-the-Fields.

Fripp left money to Durham University for an annual lecture on "happiness and success", the first – in 1932 – being given by Stanley Baldwin and another by Baden-Powell. John Hay Beith launched the Sir Alfred Fripp Memorial Fund a month after Fripp's death – devoted to the development, building and upkeep of a children's department at Guy's Hospital and the Sir Alfred Fripp Memorial Fellowship in Child Psychology. Lady Fripp and her daughters continued his work, particularly in the area of girls' and boys' Scouting. He wrote a book with a colleague – Human Anatomy For Art Students – illustrated by his cousin, Henry Charles Innes Fripp (1867-1963).
