= Nicholas Pocock =

English artist (1740–1821)

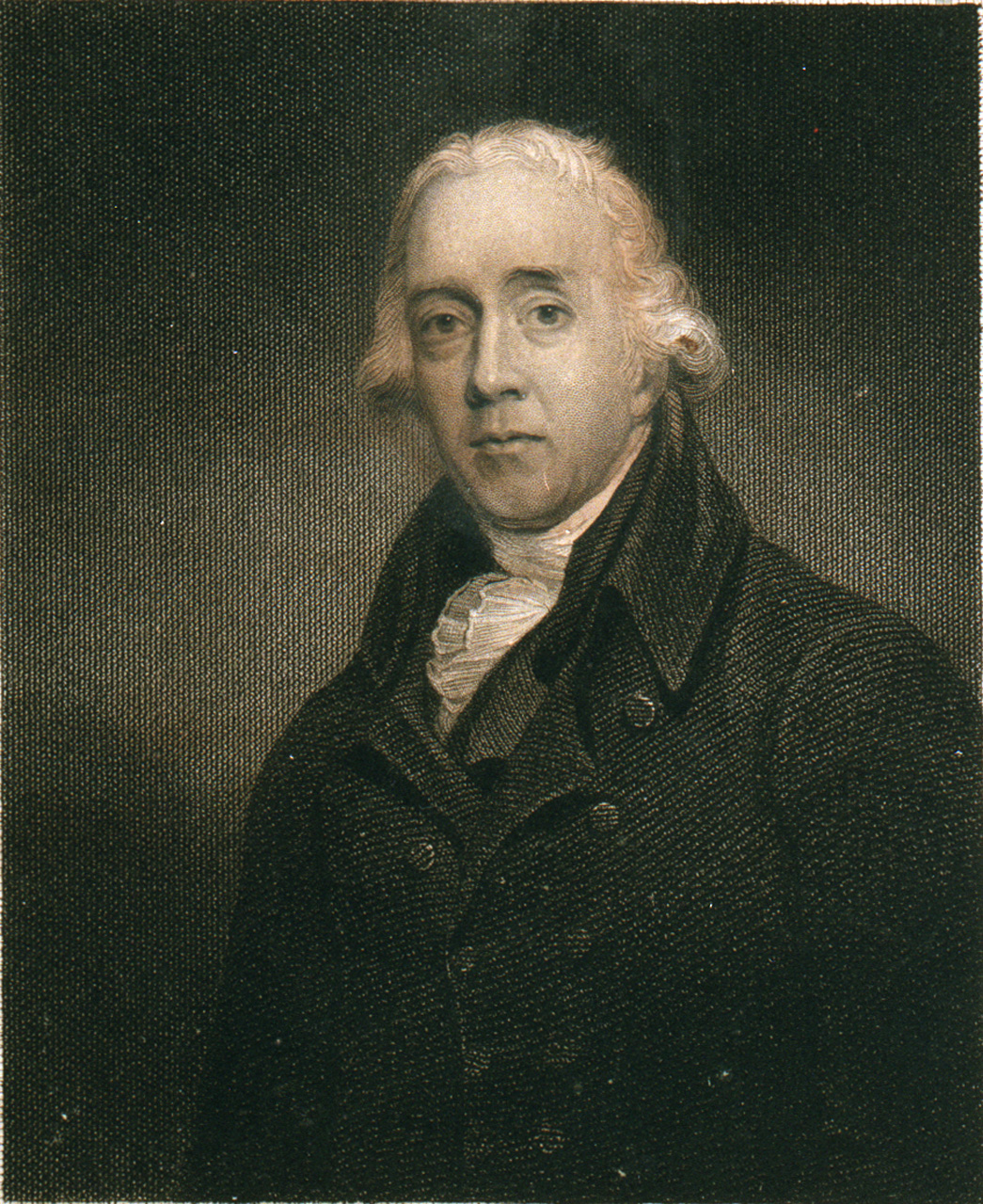
Portrait of Pocock by Edward Scriven

Nicholas Pocock (2 March 1740 – 9 March 1821) was an English artist who specialised in marine art, in both oils and watercolour.

== Birth and early career at sea ==
Pocock was born in Bristol in 1740, the son of a seaman. He followed his father's profession and was master of a merchant ship by the age of 26. During his time at sea, he became a skilled artist by making ink-and-wash sketches of ships and coastal scenes for his logbooks.

== Painting career ==
In 1778, Pocock's employer, Richard Champion, became financially insolvent due to the effects of the American Revolutionary War on transatlantic trade. As a result, Pocock gave up the sea and devoted himself to painting. The first of his works were exhibited by the Royal Academy in 1782.

Later that year, Pocock was commissioned to produce a series of paintings illustrating George Rodney's victory at the Battle of the Saintes. In 1789, he moved to London, where his reputation and contacts continued to grow. He was a favourite of Samuel Hood and was appointed Marine Painter to George III.

Pocock's naval paintings incorporated extensive research, including interviewing eyewitnesses about weather and wind conditions as well as the positions, condition, and appearance of their ships, and drawing detailed plans of the battle and preliminary sketches of individual ships. He was also present himself at the Glorious First of June in 1794, on board the frigate HMS Pegasus.

In addition to his large-scale oil paintings depicting naval battles, Pocock also produced many watercolours of coastal and ship scenes.

== Family and death ==
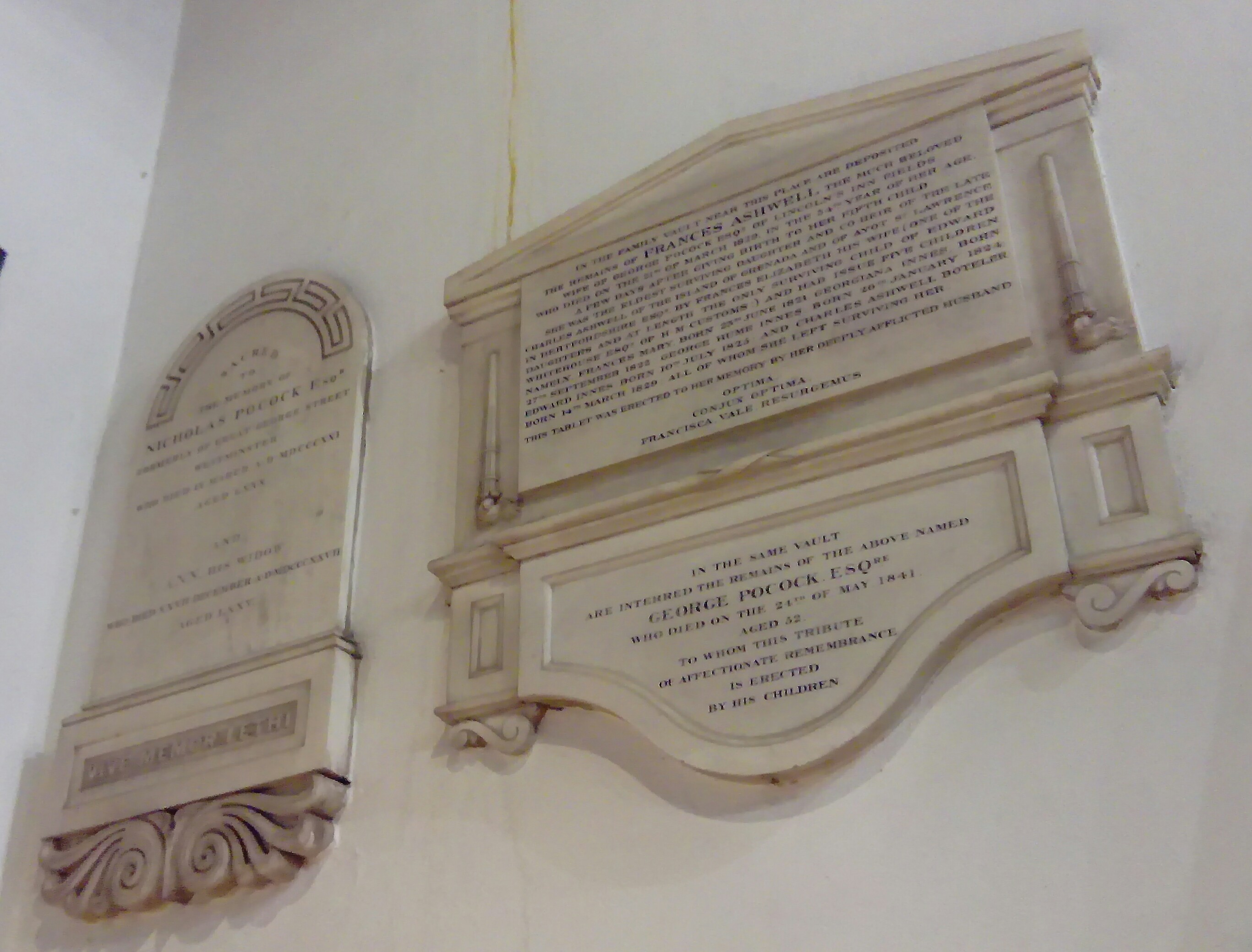
Wall memorial to Pocock in Holy Trinity Church, Cookham (left), beside those of his daughter-in-law Frances Ashwell (top right) and his son George (bottom right).

Pocock married Ann Evans of Bristol in 1780; together they had eight children. His son Isaac was an artist and dramatist, his second son William Innes Pocock was a Royal Navy Officer and marine artist. Two of his grandsons, Alfred Downing Fripp and George Arthur Fripp, were also artists.

He died on 9 March 1821 at the home of his oldest son, Isaac, in Raymead in the parish of Cookham, near Maidenhead, and is buried in the parish church there.

== Gallery ==
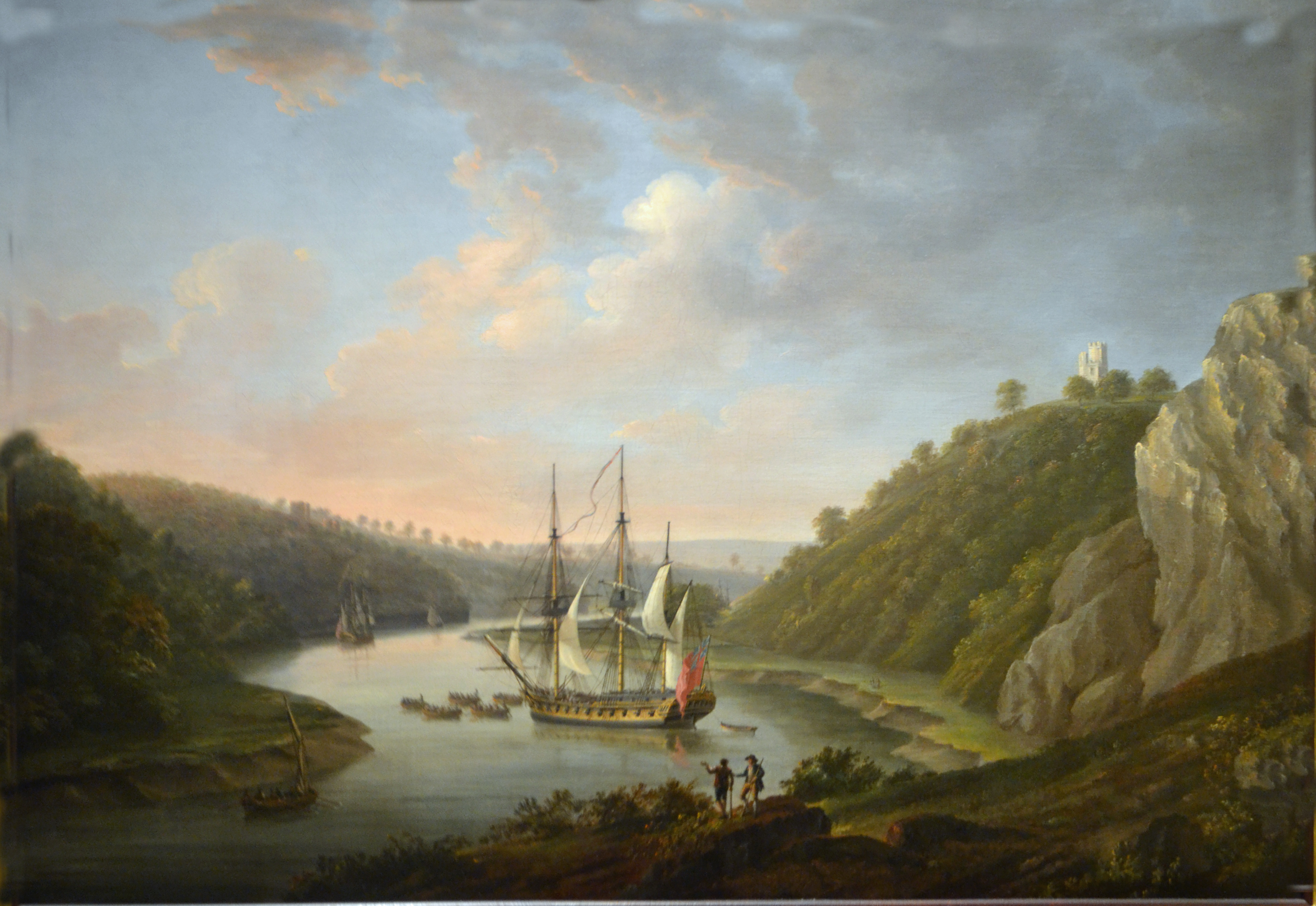
The Avon Gorge at Sunset (1785)

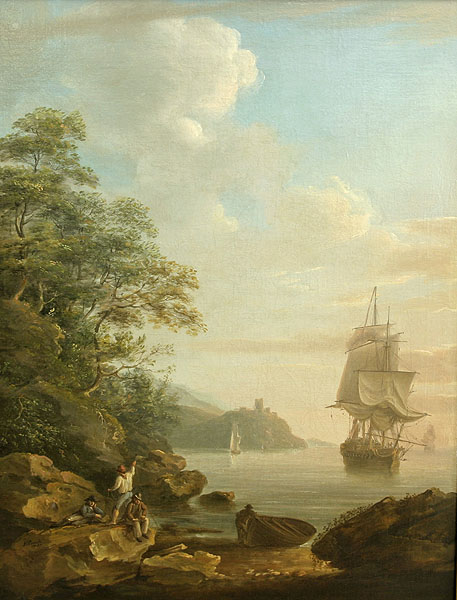
Man-Of-War at a Coastal Anchorage (1787)

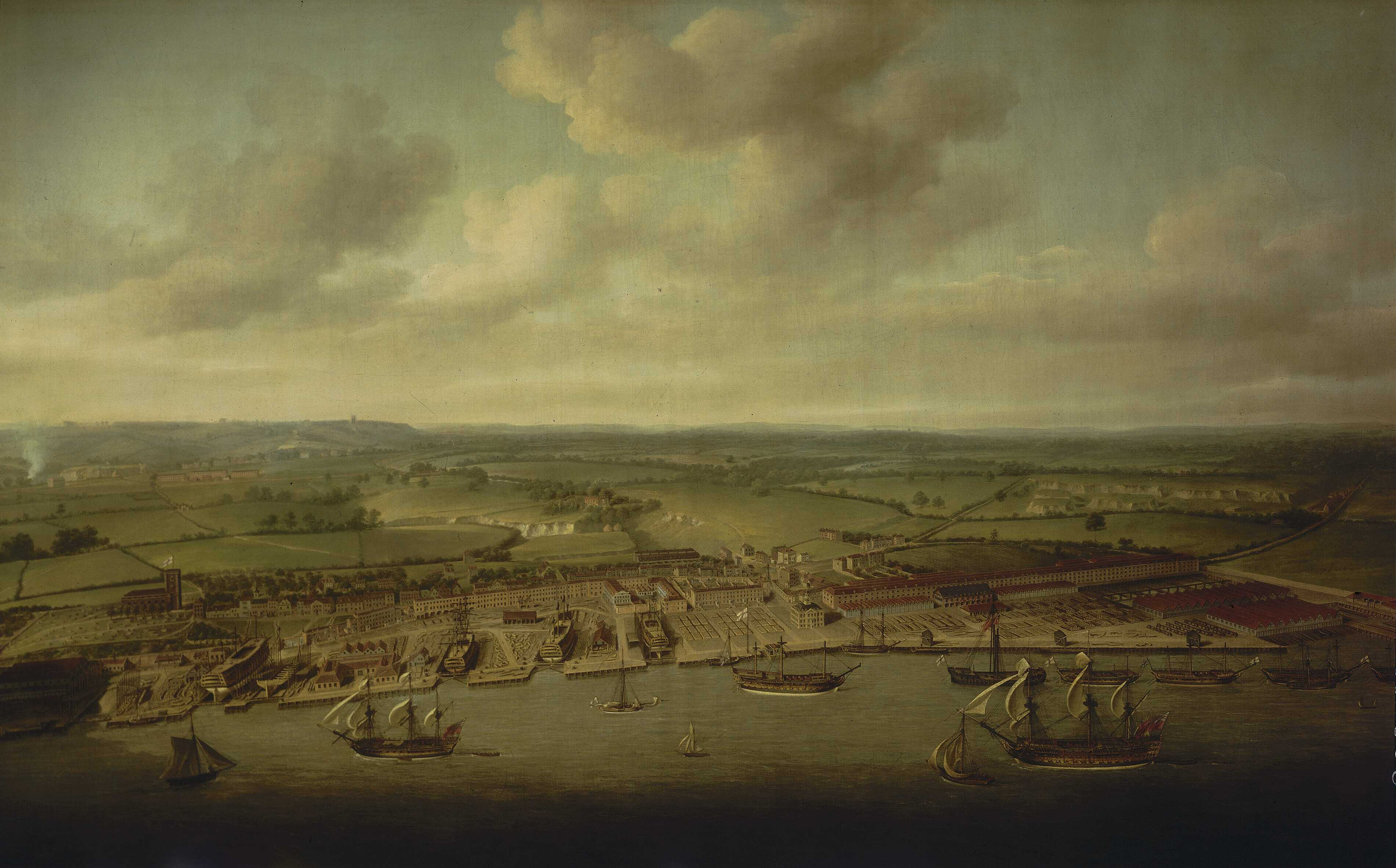
Woolwich Dockyard (1790)

The Frigate 'Triton' (1797)

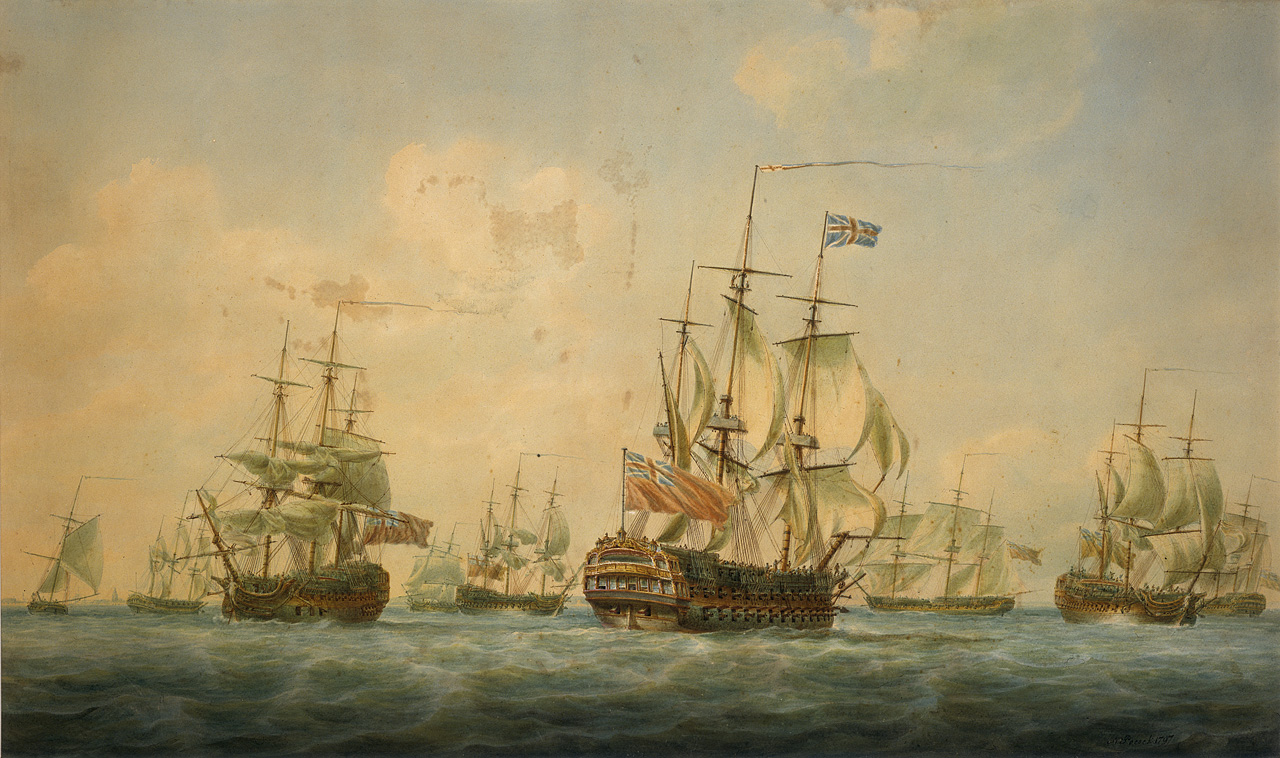
Portraits of nine ships of war and others, launched from the yards, Messrs. Randall & Brent within the space of one year (1797)

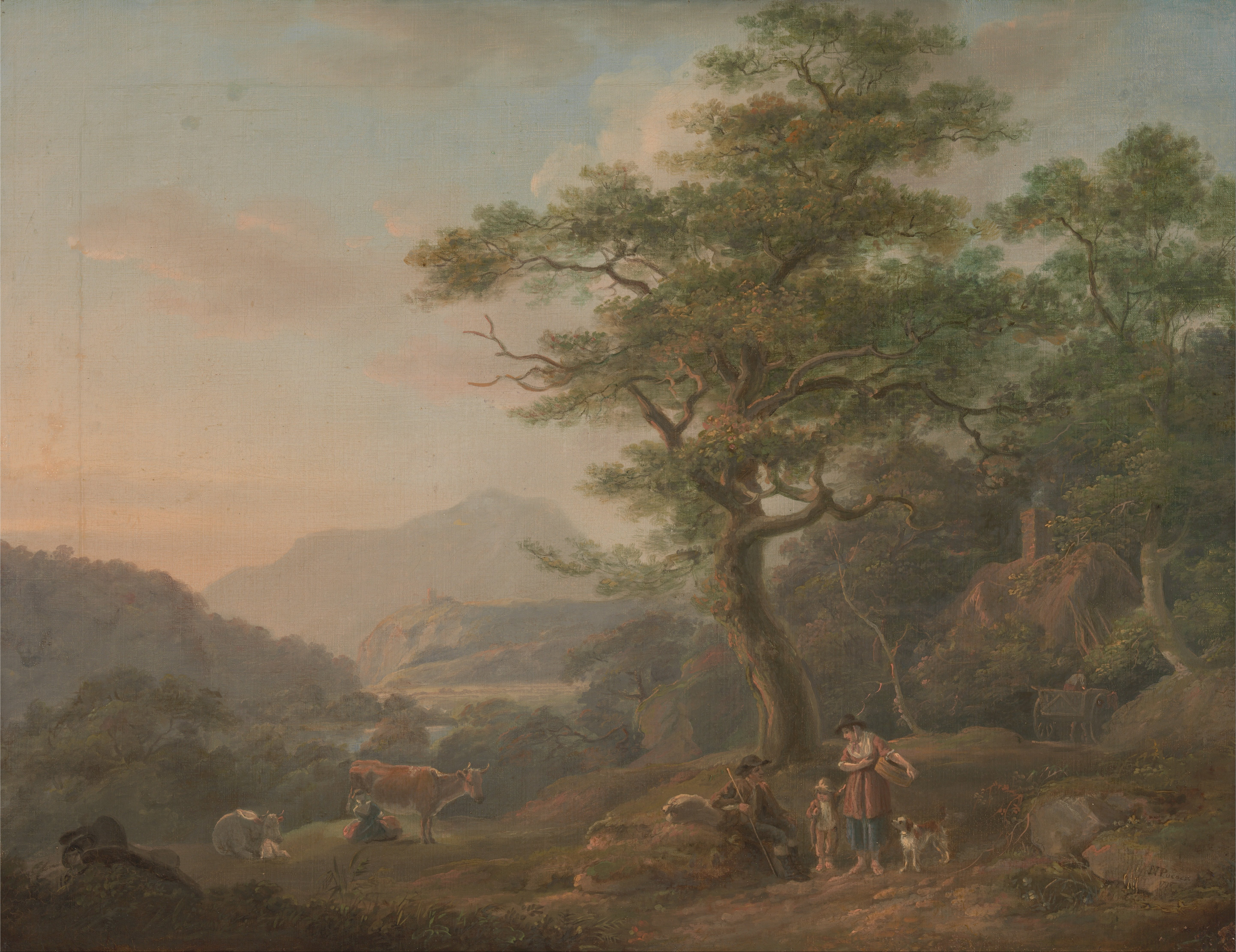
A Landscape with Figures (1798)

A fleet of East Indiamen at sea (1803)

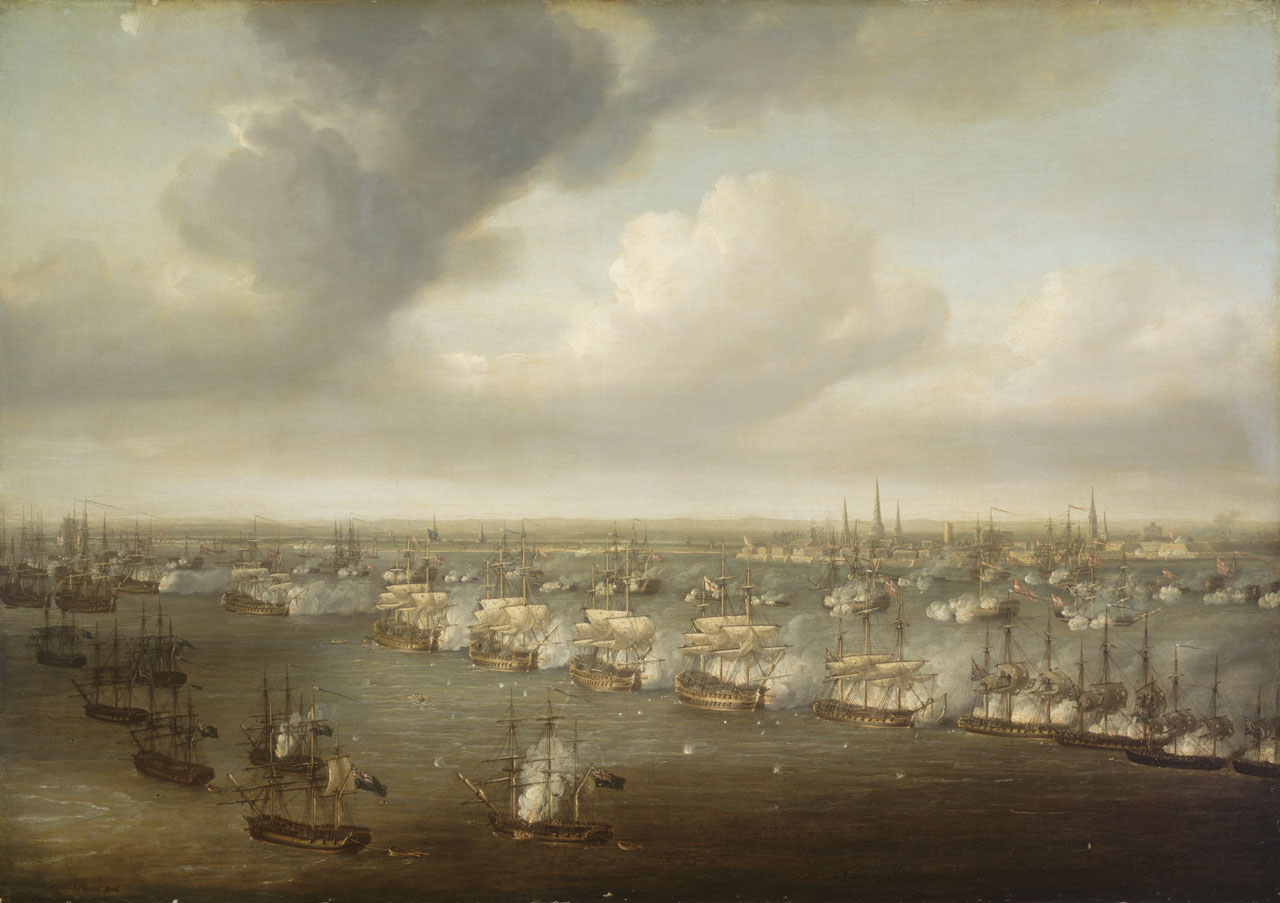
The Battle of Copenhagen, 2 April 1801 (c. 1806)

Duckworth's Action off San Domingo, 6 February 1806 (1808)

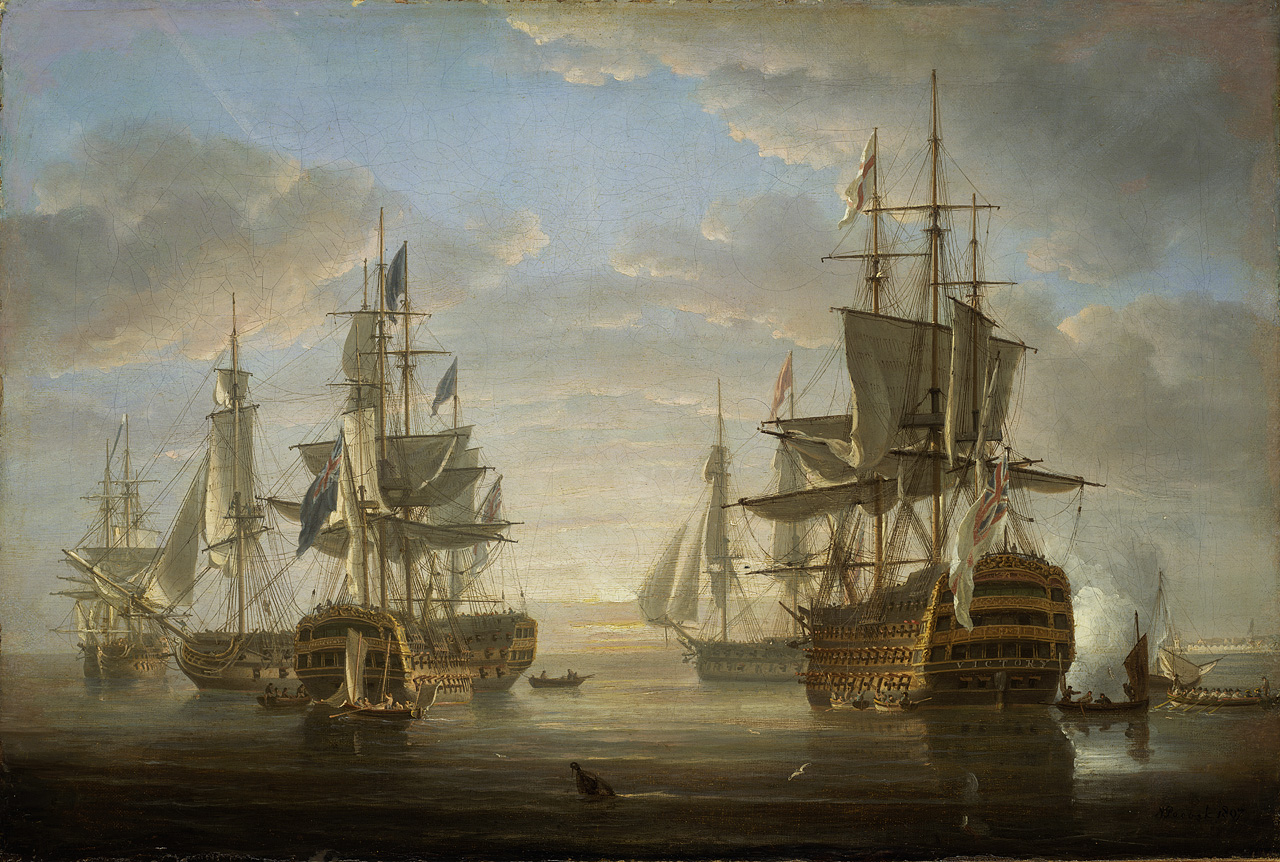
Nelson's flagships at anchor (1809)

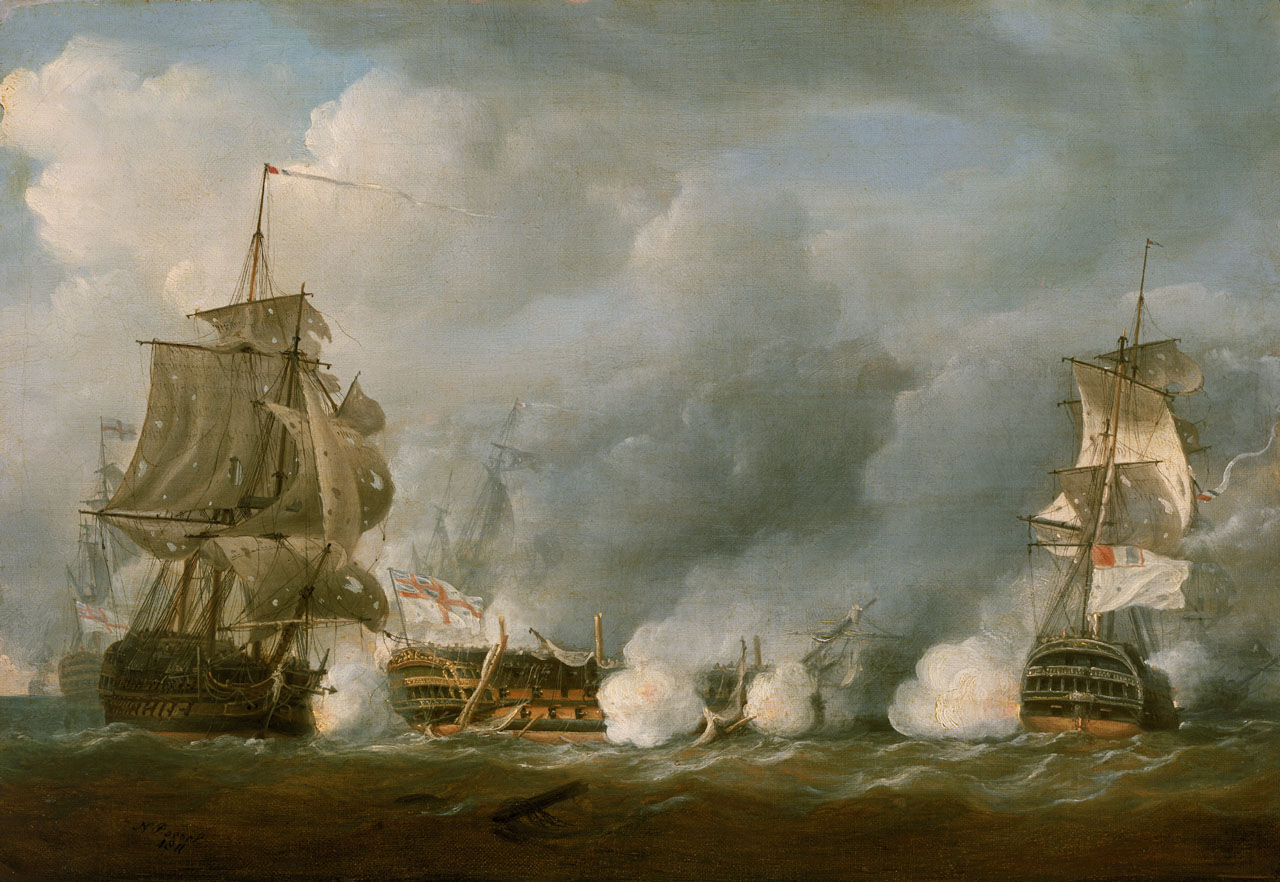
The 'Defence' at the Battle of the First of June, 1794 (1811)
