= Alfred Downing Fripp (artist) =

English painter

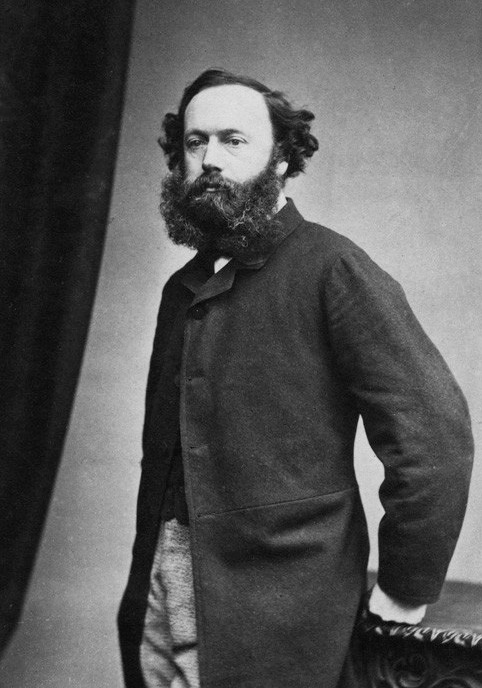
Alfred Downing Fripp

Alfred Downing Fripp (22 April 1822 – 13 March 1895) was an English painter who specialised in watercolours of rural genre figures. He was grandson of the marine artist Nicholas Pocock, a brother of the painter George Arthur Fripp, and father of the surgeon Sir Alfred Downing Fripp.

Fripp was born in Bristol and studied at the Royal Academy of Arts. He held his first exhibition in 1842, his initial works featuring Irish and Welsh peasants in landscape settings. In 1844 he became an associate of the Old Watercolour Society, progressing to full membership in 1846, and ultimately becoming its secretary from 1870 onward.

Following the death of his first wife in 1850, he spent four years in Italy, where he became friends in Rome with Frederick Leighton and Edward Poynter. During this period his subjects became Italian, mostly studies of young peasants. On his return in 1854 he reverted to painting British subjects. After a second, briefer, Italian visit in 1859 he married Eliza Banister Roe. He had a particular interest in Dorset scenery around Lulworth. Many of Eliza's younger siblings were models for his paintings including "the Fisher Boy". He died, aged 72, in London.

== Gallery ==
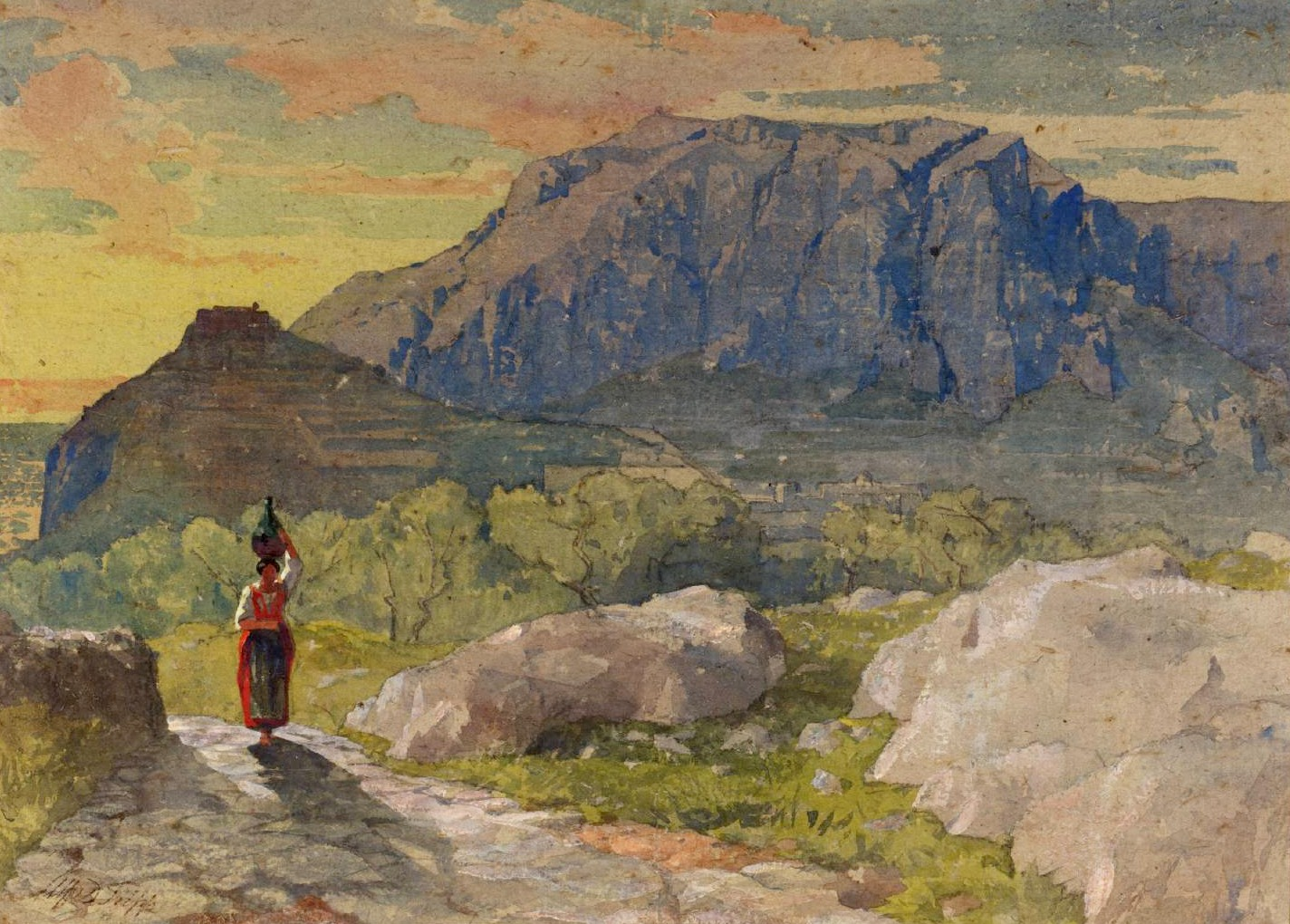
Peasant Woman in a Mountainous Landscape

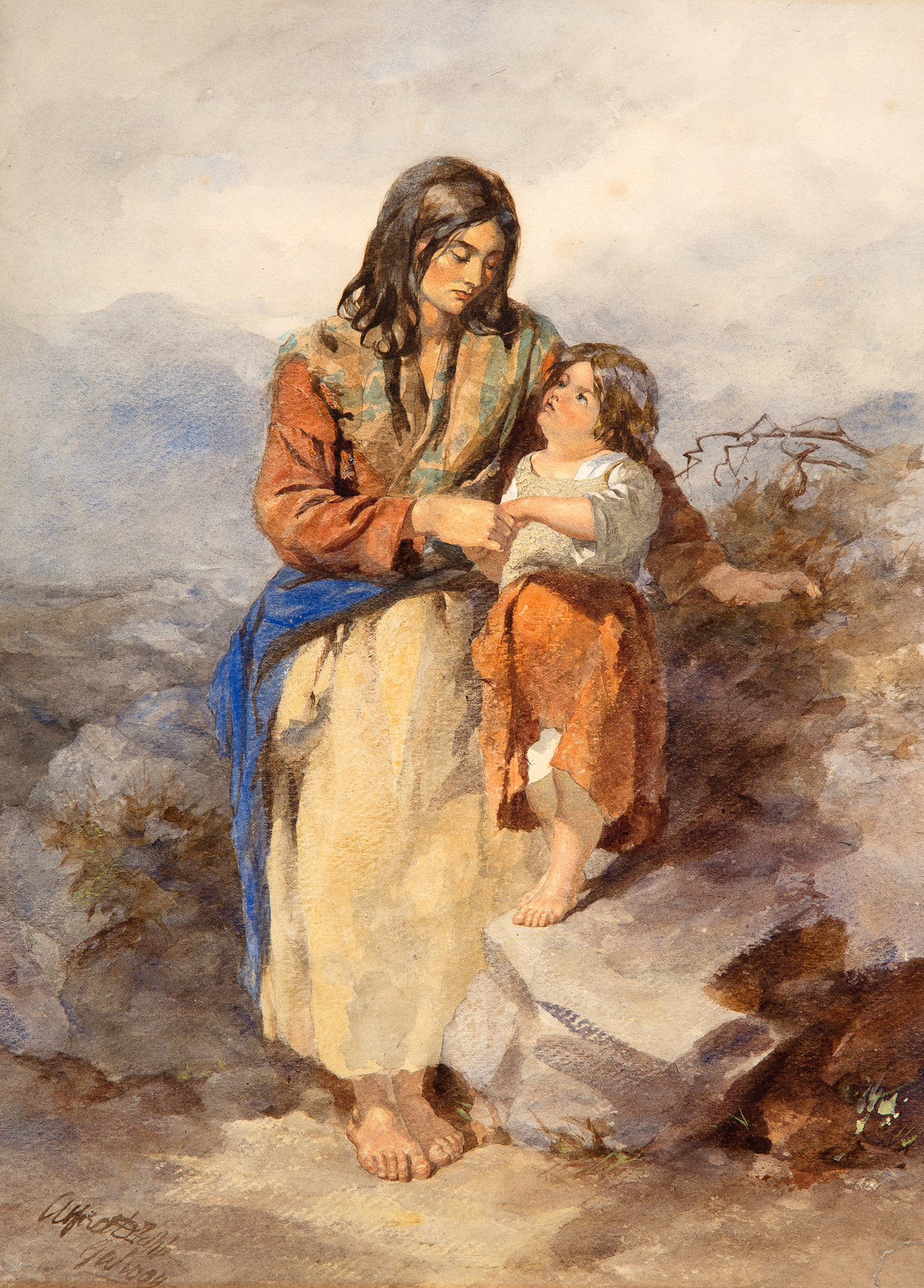
Galway Woman and Child

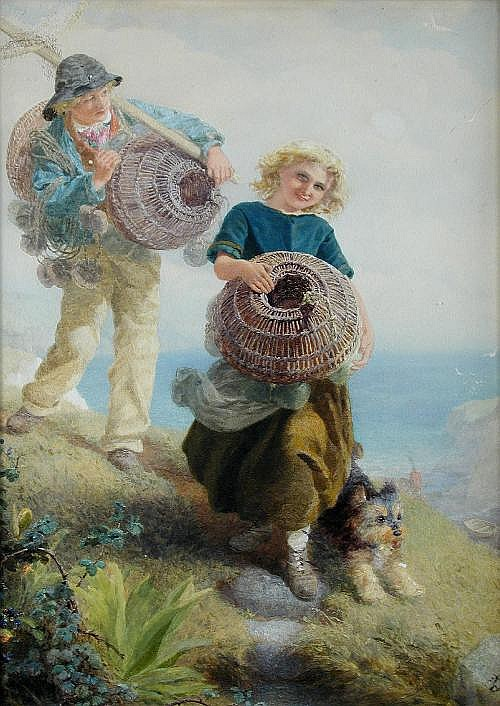
The Young Shrimpers

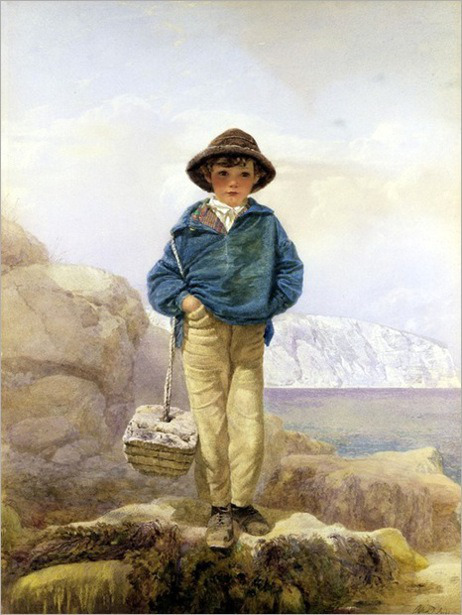
A Fisher Boy

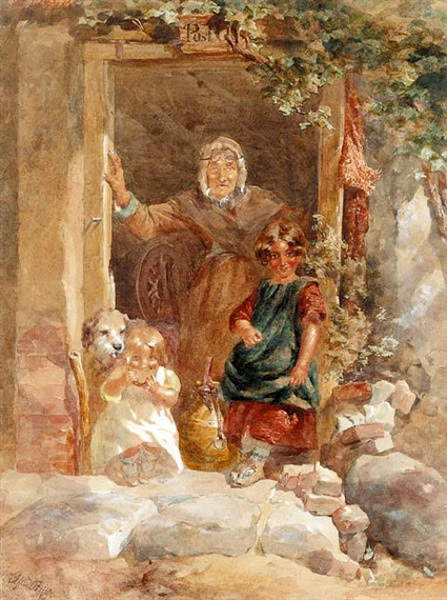
Figures Before An Irish Post Office

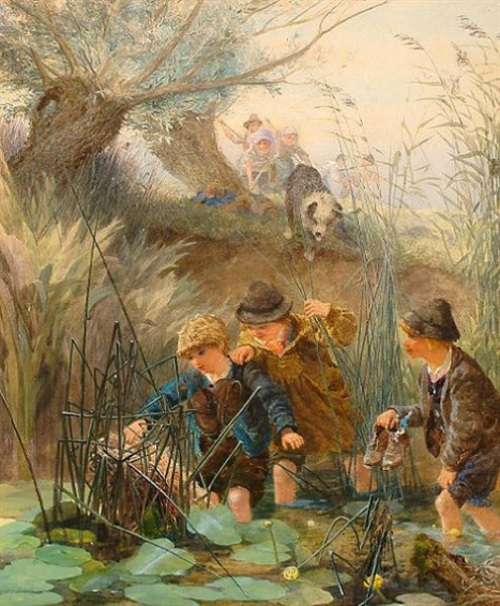
Mischievous Friends

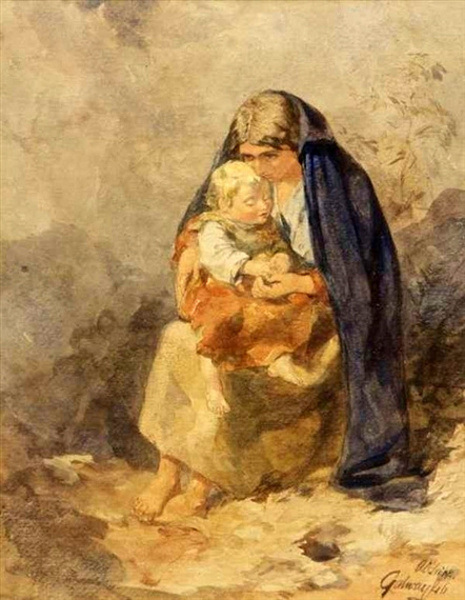
The Irish Mother

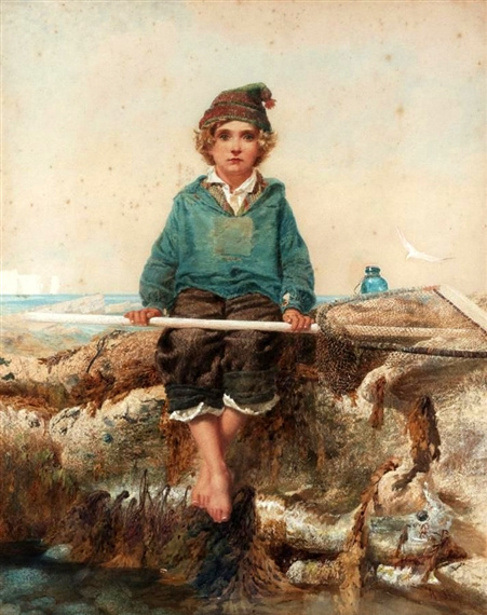
The Little Shrimper

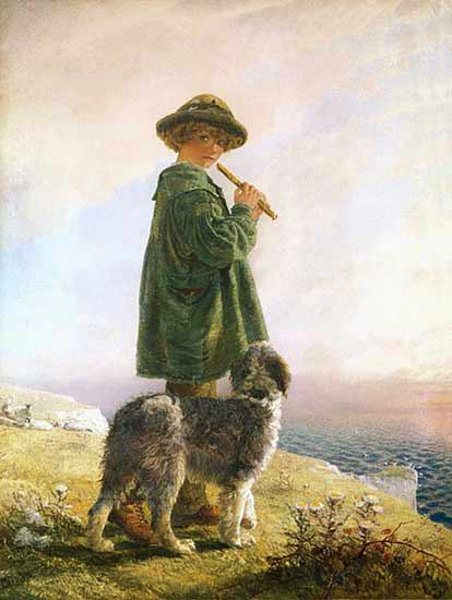
The Piping Shepherd

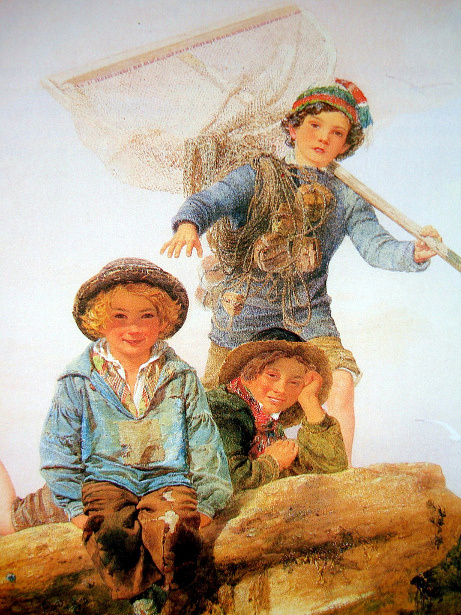
Watching The Porpoises
