= Sarah Lindley Crease =

Canadian artist

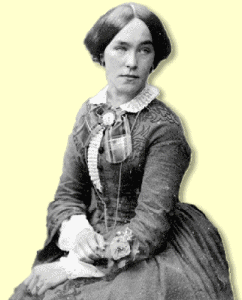
- Born: Sarah Lindley; 1826; Acton Green, Middlesex, near London, England
- Died: 1922 (aged 95–96)
- Spouse: Henry Pering Pellew Crease (m. 1853)

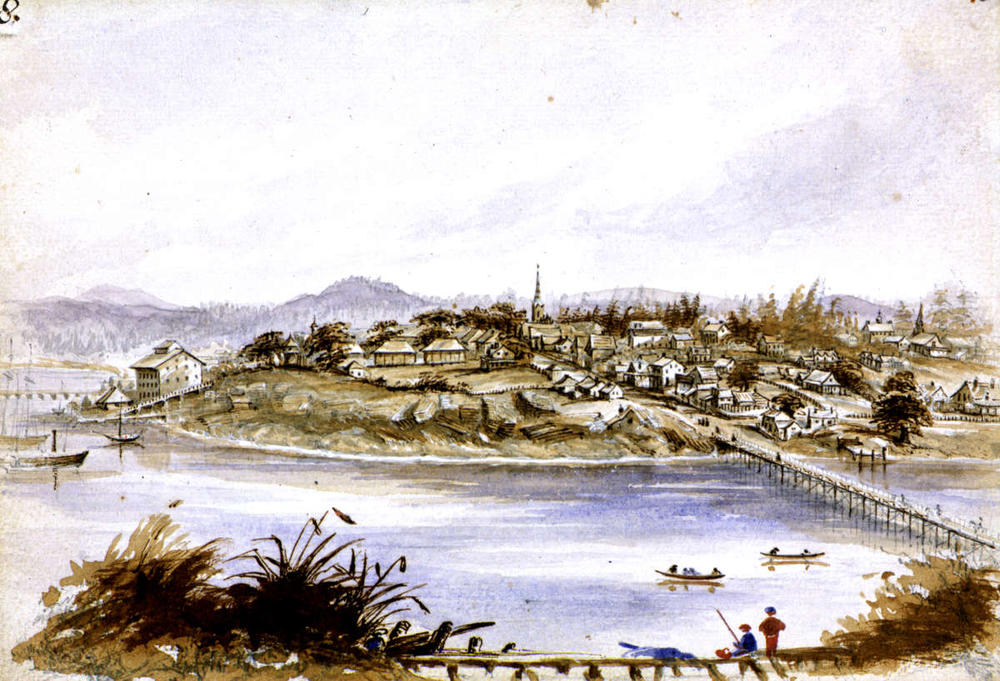
Bridge Leading To Red Government Buildings From The Top Of Which This View Is Taken - No. 8 (1860), watercolor, Royal British Columbia Museum

Sarah Lindley Crease (1826–1922) was a Canadian artist.

Born in England, as the daughter of botanist John Lindley, Crease studied art with Charles Fox and Sarah Ann Drake. Her early works were botanical illustrations for her father's publications, such as The Gardener's Chronicle. Sarah married Henry Pering Pellew Crease on 27 April 1853 after a four-year engagement. She emigrated to Vancouver Island in 1859, where her husband was a barrister. He later would become a prominent Supreme Court Judge. Besides her seven children, Crease taught Sunday school in the Anglican church and was a volunteer and fundraiser for many local cultural institutions. She was a talented amateur as a painter and is noted for her many watercolours of the Hudson's Bay Company fort, the city of Victoria, British Columbia, and other British Columbia locales. In her later life glaucoma limited her ability to paint. In addition to her painting Sarah kept detailed diaries which depicted the complexities of daily life in British Columbia. Her cumulative body of work comprises a "detailed pictorial record of colonial British Columbia". Her fonds is in BC Archives, Royal BC Museum, part of Series MS-2879 - the Crease family collection. In 1896 she became Lady Crease after the knighting of her husband. Lady Crease remained active in her community until she broke her hip in 1919.

== Bibliography ==
- Bridge, Kathryn (1996). Henry & Self: The Private Life of Sarah Crease 1826-1922. Victoria, B.C.: Sono Nis Press.
- Carter, Kathryn (2002). The Small Details of Life: Twenty Diaries by Women in Canada, 1830-1996. University of Toronto Press. ISBN 978-1-4426-8237-5. Project MUSE book 105439.
