= The Brentford Trilogy =

Novel series by writer Robert Rankin

The Brentford Trilogy is a series of twelve novels by writer Robert Rankin. They humorously chronicle the lives of a couple of drunken middle-aged layabouts, Jim Pooley and John Omalley, who confront the forces of darkness in the environs of West London, usually with the assistance of large quantities of beer from their favourite public house, The Flying Swan.

== Novels ==
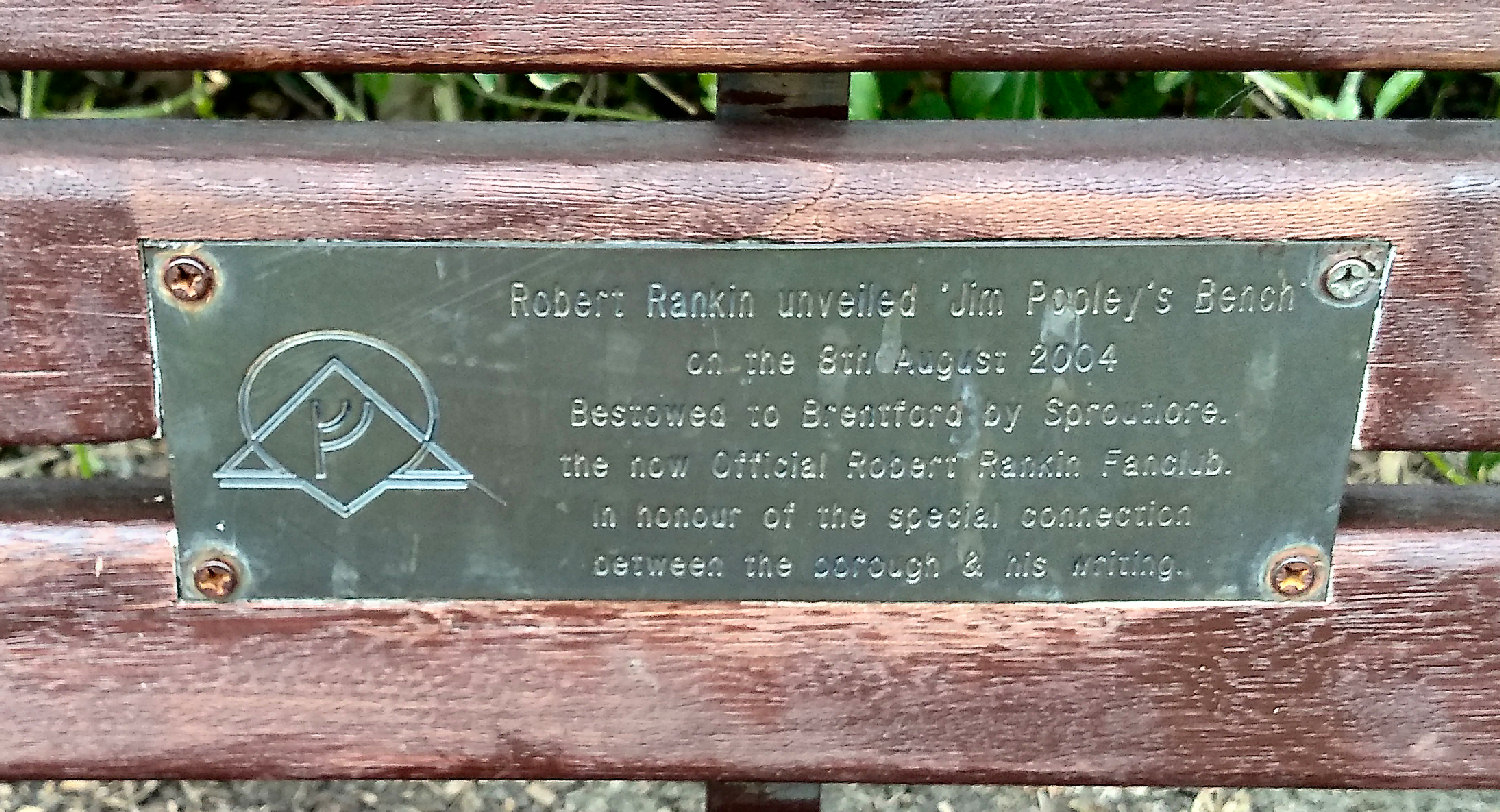
Jim Pooley's bench, Brentford Library

The novels in this series are as follows:

1. The Antipope (1981) – Pooley and Omalley take on the resurrected Pope Alexander VI, the last Borgia pope.
2. The Brentford Triangle (1982) – Pooley and Omalley thwart an alien invasion of Earth when the natives of Ceres (the fifth planet in the solar system before it exploded and became the asteroid belt) come back to the system and seek a new home.
3. East of Ealing (1984) – Pooley and Omalley are forced to deal with a high-tech Satanic takeover of Earth by way of barcoding the entire population, aided by a temporarily-relocated version of Sherlock Holmes.
4. The Sprouts of Wrath (1988) – the unlikely decision to site the next Olympic Games in Brentford threatens to disrupt Pooley and Omalley's way of life, as the evil Kaleton threatens to turn the stadium into a monster to destroy humanity.
5. The Brentford Chainstore Massacre (1997) – as the millennium comes early for Brentford, Dr. Steven Malone finds a way to clone Jesus from the Turin Shroud, as chief executive of the millennium committee called Fred (who sold his soul to the devil for ultimate power) attempts to force Pooley into sabotaging a ceremony that will give his Master power over all the world.
6. Sex and Drugs and Sausage Rolls (2000) – Omalley manages a rock group, the lead singer of whom has the power to heal the sick. This book also sees the return of Soap Distant and Small Dave. In this book, Pooley suffers a brutal, but not long-term death.
7. Knees Up Mother Earth (2004) – there's big trouble in little Brentford. Property developers are planning to destroy Griffin Park, the borough's beloved football ground, intending to dig up the creature buried underneath it – namely, the serpent that tempted Eve in the Garden of Eden; the source of original sin. As well as being the seventh book in The Brentford Trilogy, it is also the second book in The Witches of Chiswick Trilogy.
8. The Brightonomicon (2005) – Hugo Rune and his amnesiac assistant Rizla work to stop Count Otto Black from finding the Chronovision. Unlike the other novels in the series, it is set in Brighton and Omalley only makes an appearance in the final chapter. It is revealed that Rizla on this occasion (Rune's many acolytes are always called Rizla), is actually Pooley.
9. Retromancer (2009) – the sequel to The Brightonomicon again pairs the young Jim Pooley with Hugo Rune in another series of adventures only set partially in Brentford. This book also forms a prequel to The Antipope. Set in a dystopia, history has been changed: Germany won World War II, America is a nuclear wasteland, and Jim Pooley and Hugo Rune must set it right.
10. The Lord of the Ring Roads (2017) – the first of the last Brentford Trilogy.
11. The Chronicles of Banarnia (2019) – second part of the final Brentford trilogy.
12. Normanghast (2023) – The third book in the final Brentford Trilogy.

Several of Rankin's other novels feature Pooley and Omalley, but are not part of The Brentford Trilogy:

- They Came And Ate Us (Armageddon II: The B-Movie) (1991) – Pooley and Omalley make a brief appearance as one of a number of "trick endings".
- The Most Amazing Man Who Ever Lived (1995) – Pooley and Omalley make a brief appearance, offering their help to Tuppe as he plans to free the book's lead character, Cornelius Murphy, from prison. Before they can put their plan into action Cornelius reveals he has already escaped without their help.
- Nostradamus Ate My Hamster (1996) – a movie prop-house worker finds a way to put old stars back on the silver screen. Over the course of the book, he learns of the legends of Pooley and Omalley and sets out in search of The Flying Swan, culminating in a desperate race to stop the return of Adolf Hitler.
- Web Site Story (2002) – set in the year 2022, Pooley and Omalley have long since passed into the myths and legends of Brentford lore. As people start vanishing into thin air in Brentford, the staff of the Brentford Mercury investigate.

Although the books theoretically form a series, actually there is little continuity between volumes. World-changing events that take place in one book are usually ignored in following volumes, and it is very rare for the events of a previous book to be referred to. For example, the character of shopkeeper Norman Hartnell (not to be confused with the fashion designer of the same name) is abandoned by his wife yet is inexplicably reunited with her in later books. Soap Distant also appears in later books as a Brentford resident despite being declared dead, becoming an albino and dwelling beneath the earth.

== Recurring characters ==
- John Vincent Omally and Jim Pooley – an Irishman living in Brentford and his best friend. The 'heroes' of the series.
- Neville – the part-time barman (who is actually full-time since nobody knows where the real one is) who holds down the Flying Swan in Brentford.
- Norman Hartnell – Brentford shopkeeper and inventor of various bizarre gadgets, including a means of transporting the Great Pyramid from Egypt to Brentford. Not to be confused with the other Norman Hartnell.
- Old Pete and Chips – Old Pete (Age unconfirmed, although he seems to be over a hundred) always appears in the Flying Swan, and Chips is his scraggly dog. He appears as a Victorian street urchin in The Witches of Chiswick but is known by the name 'Winston'. In Knees Up Mother Earth he accompanied H. G. Wells to the 20th century where his older self tells him to buy shares in the Ford Motor Company.
- Professor Slocombe – aged, wise magician who often supplies much of the exposition about the various enemies present in the series (He was apparently Merlin in the distant past). Is once described as bearing a resemblance to Peter Cushing. Has a butler named Gammon.
- Marchant – John Omalley's bicycle, whose anthropomorphic qualities may be a reference to Flann O'Brien's novel The Third Policeman.
- Soap Distant – Last of a long line of Distants who have spent their lives searching for the denizens of the inner Earth. Soap is an ordinary man when first seen but returns as a cowled and robed albino after five years 'below'.
- Small Dave – Brentford's dwarf postman, known to all as a 'vindictive, grudge-bearing wee bastard'. Raised the ghost of Edgar Allan Poe.
- Hugo Artemis Solon Saturnicus Reginald Arthur Rune – mystic, charlatan and confidence trickster and self declared 'most amazing man who ever lived' (was also apparently Merlin in a previous time, See Retromancer). Has an acolyte named Rizla.
- Hairy Dave and Jungle John – these two brothers are local jobbing builders who are known for their wild coiffure.
- Archroy – former worker at the rubber factory who became a globe trotting master of the martial arts.
- Jennifer Naylor – Brentford's sexy lady librarian, later elevated to the town council.
- Young Master Robert – the brewery owner's son and the bane of Neville's existence.
- Leo Felix – Rastafarian who drives a tow truck.
