= Chilton Polden =

Village in Somerset, England

Coordinates: 51.153°N 2.896°W

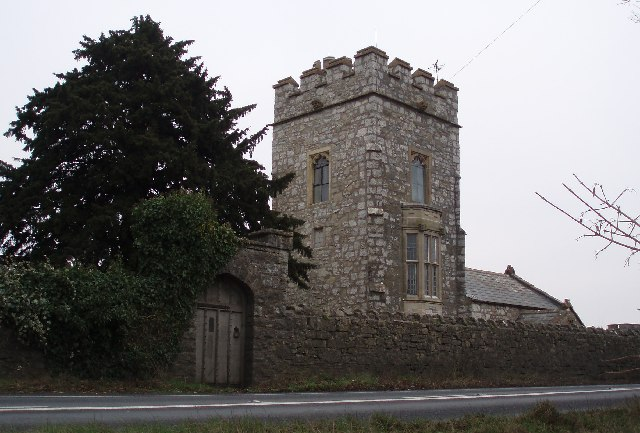
- Chilton Priory

- Location within Somerset
- Population: 698 (2011)
- OS grid reference: ST374396
- Unitary authority: Somerset Council
- Ceremonial county: Somerset
- Region: South West
- Country: England
- Sovereign state: United Kingdom
- Post town: BRIDGWATER
- Postcode district: TA7
- Dialling code: 01278
- Police: Avon and Somerset
- Fire: Devon and Somerset
- Ambulance: South Western
- UK Parliament: Wells and Mendip Hills

Chilton Polden is a rural village and civil parish, situated close to Edington on the Somerset Levels to the north of the Polden Hills in Somerset, England.

== History ==
The name of the village is thought to derive from its position on limestone and from the hill on which part of the parish lies. The form Chelton upon Poledowne is found in 1664. The Polden estate was given to Glastonbury Abbey by Æthelheard of Wessex in 729.

Chilton Priory (also known as Stradling's Folly) was originally built as a folly, and subsequently enlarged to become a country house. The tower and wing at the rear were built in 1838, for William Stradling. Stradling also incorporated various pieces of buildings and archaeological relics from around the county, especially materials from a Roman Villa at Chedzoy. The upper windows, battlements and grotesque heads came from a demolished castle at Enmore and the pinnacles from an old church tower at Langport. The staircase turret came from a church in Shepton Mallet and three of the windows in the nave from a chapel at Slapeland. The Priory has more recently been home to Katherine Maltwood who was an artist and became known as the discoverer of the Glastonbury Zodiac (otherwise known as the Temple of the Stars), an enormous geomantic creation surrounding the Tor at Glastonbury. The Temple was another folly tower, built by Stradling in the early 19th incorporating re-used 15th features.

The village gives its name to the ambling piano piece The Way to Polden (Op. 76) by British composer York Bowen.

== Governance ==
The parish council has responsibility for local issues, including setting an annual precept (local rate) to cover the council's operating costs and producing annual accounts for public scrutiny. The parish council evaluates local planning applications and works with the local police, district council officers, and neighbourhood watch groups on matters of crime, security, and traffic. The parish council's role also includes initiating projects for the maintenance and repair of parish facilities, as well as consulting with the district council on the maintenance, repair, and improvement of highways, drainage, footpaths, public transport, and street cleaning. Conservation matters (including trees and listed buildings) and environmental issues are also the responsibility of the council.

For local government purposes, since 1 April 2023, the village comes under the unitary authority of Somerset Council. Prior to this, it was part of the non-metropolitan district of Sedgemoor, which was formed on 1 April 1974 under the Local Government Act 1972, having previously been part of Bridgwater Rural District.

It is also part of the Wells and Mendip Hills constituency represented in the House of Commons of the Parliament of the United Kingdom. It elects one Member of Parliament (MP) by the first past the post system of election, and was part of the South West England constituency of the European Parliament prior to Britain leaving the European Union in January 2020, which elected seven MEPs using the d'Hondt method of party-list proportional representation.

== Geography ==
Catcott, Edington and Chilton Moors SSSI is a 1,083-hectare (2,680-acre) biological Site of Special Scientific Interest consisting of land south of the River Brue managed by Somerset Wildlife Trust and is known for the variety of the bird life. The site consists of low-lying land south of the River Brue, which floods on a regular basis; land north is included in the Tealham and Tadham Moors SSSI. The site is managed by Somerset Wildlife Trust and includes the Catcott Lows National Nature Reserve, of grassland in the summer, but flood during the winter, creating a perfect habitat for wintering waterfowl and Bewick's swans, Roe deer and several invertebrate species of scientific interest also inhabit the area, Catcott Heath and Catcott North.

== Religious sites ==
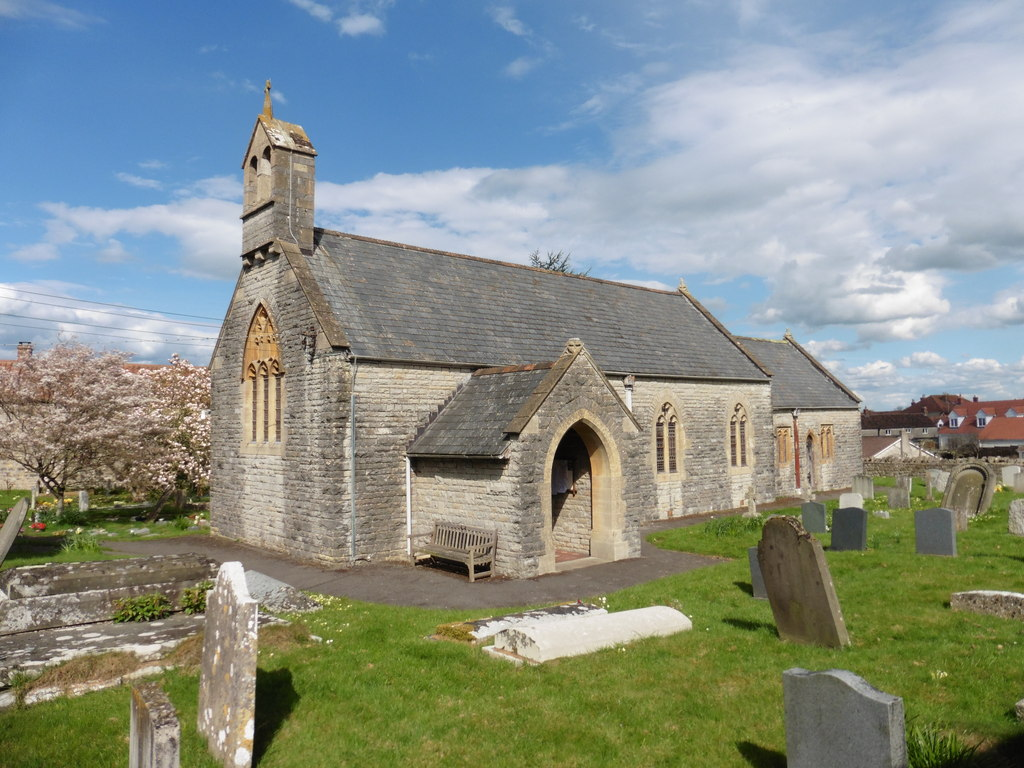
St Edward’s Church

The Anglican parish church of St Edward has 15th-century origins and was rebuilt in 1889 by Henry Edwards. The Parish Room in the churchyard dates from the 14th century.
