= Chilton Priory =

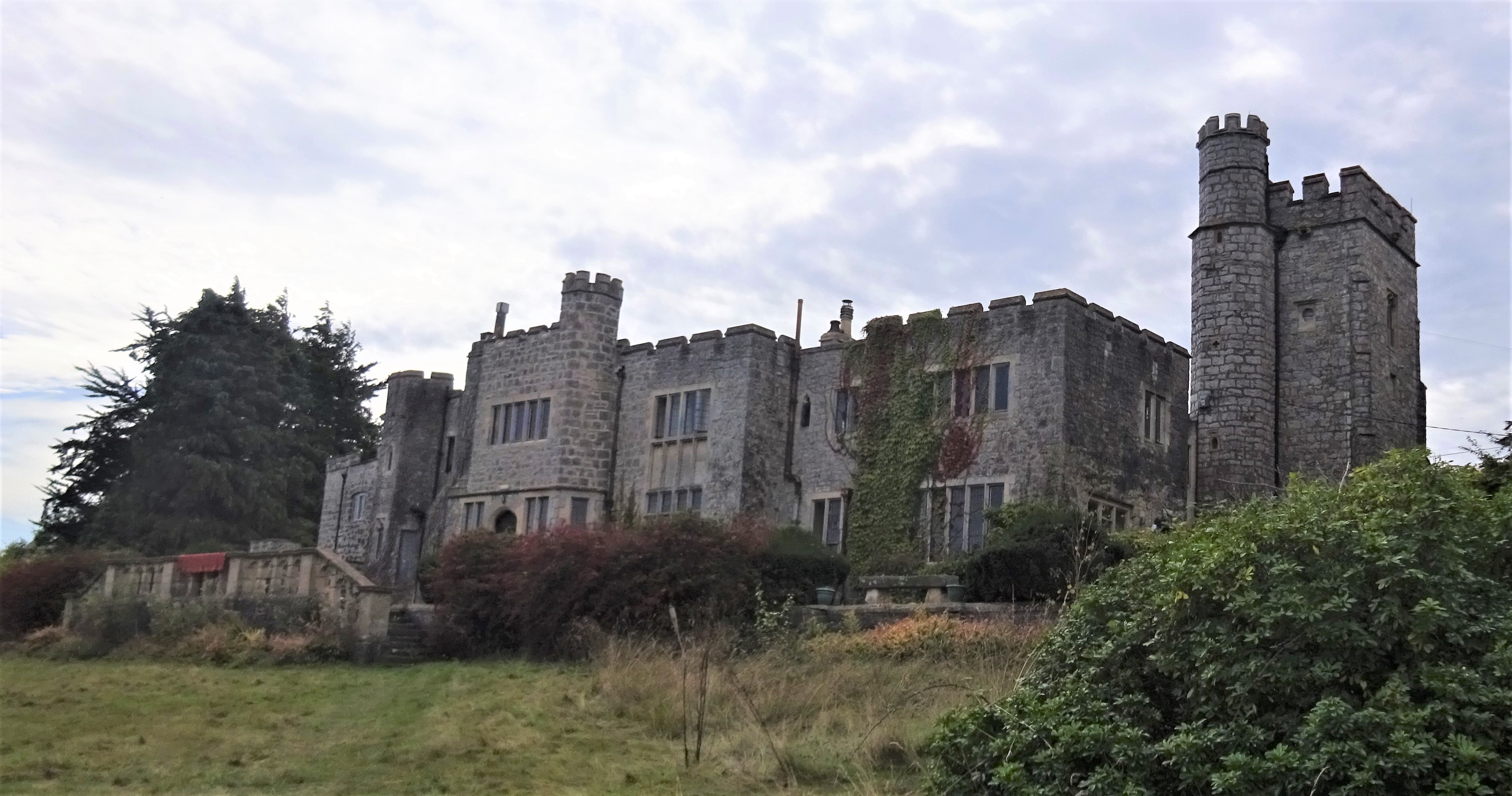
- Chilton Priory and Folly Tower

General information
- Status: Grade II listed
- Type: Folly tower and mansion
- Architectural style: Gothic Revival Tudor revival
- Location: Chilton Polden, Somerset, England
- Coordinates: 51.146442°N 2.8963378°W
- Completed: 1838
- Client: William Stradling. Major Kennedy. John & Katharine Maltwood.

Technical details
- Floor count: 3

Design and construction
- Architect: credited to William Halliday. F. Bligh Bond.
- Designations: Grade II listed

Chilton Priory (ST373389) (sometimes Stradling's Tower) is a Grade II listed folly, later extended to become a country house prominently located on Polden Hill, overlooking Bath Road, close to Chilton Polden, Parish of Polden Wheel, Somerset. The tower was erected in 1838 for William Stradling, deputy lieutenant of Somerset and a descendant of the local Stradling family who date back to the fourteenth century. The building commands extensive views over Somerset, including Glastonbury Tor. The first Ordnance Survey in 1886 recorded the tower and pleasure grounds as 'Chilton Priory (Museum).'

== The Folly and the later mansion ==
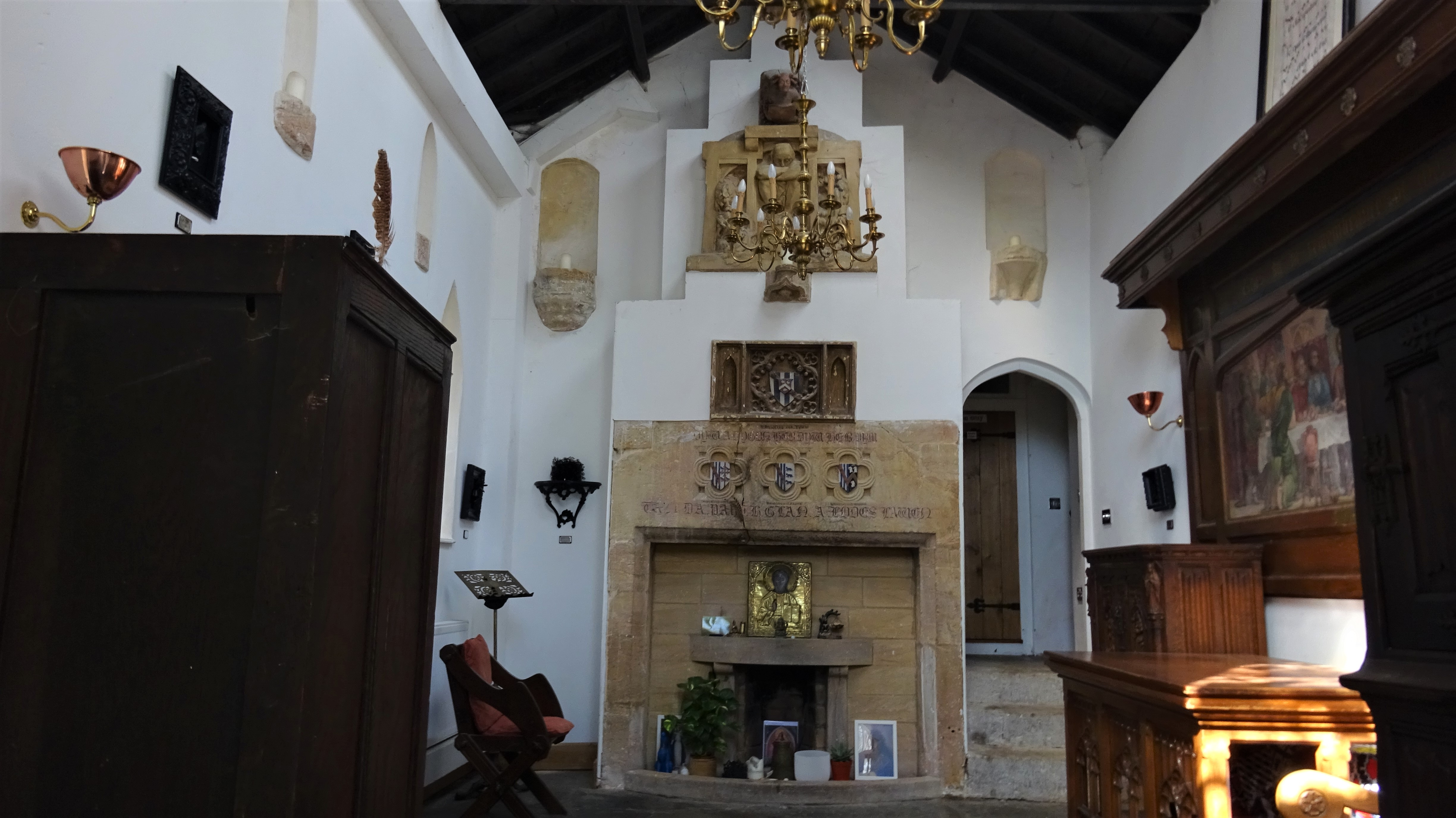
The Refectory

Stradling refers to it as the 'Priory of Chilton-Super-Polden in his book of 1839. Built as a landmark, it was also designed to be functional. The folly is a three-storey tower containing the Charles and Victoria rooms, with an observatory, nave, refectory, oratory and a crypt below, with a wing at the rear was built in 1838, probably by the architect William Halliday, for the antique and art collector William Stradling to house his acquisitions. A plaque recording the name 'G. Dowden 1836' is set atop the tower above the doorway. Stradling did not live at Chilton Priory, his abode was at Roseville, now The Towers House in the village, located within a small park with a grotto, bridge and temple.

Stradling acquired and incorporated materials from the Roman Villa at Chedzoy; an old church at Langport provided the pinnacles; the grotesque heads, the upper windows and battlements came from a demolished castle at Enmore; staircase turret from a church in Shepton Mallet and three of the nave windows came from a chapel at Slapeland. The buildings have several gargoyles. The single-storey wing attached to the east of tower, has lancet windows and the gabled porch to the south has a fine door dated 1616. The south and east ranges have two storeys with stone mullioned windows.

The refectory has some mediaeval stained glass, a fireplace set in a massive freestone surround and a 17th-century altar rail. The inset above in the fireplace surround is an example of one of the eighteen sculptural works that she produced. This 1910 work, 'Magna Mater' (Great Mother), has links with Cybele and was commissioned by Elbert and Alice Hubbard. The roof has gilt and oak rosettes from the Church of Glastonbury and on one of the beams is an elegantly carved scrawl surmounted by some tabernacle work, painted blue and red, ornamented with gold, taken from York Minster after the fire caused by an incendiary in WW2. The small Oratory at the east end has a floor of ancient monastic tiles from the Abbeys of Glastonbury and Tintern.

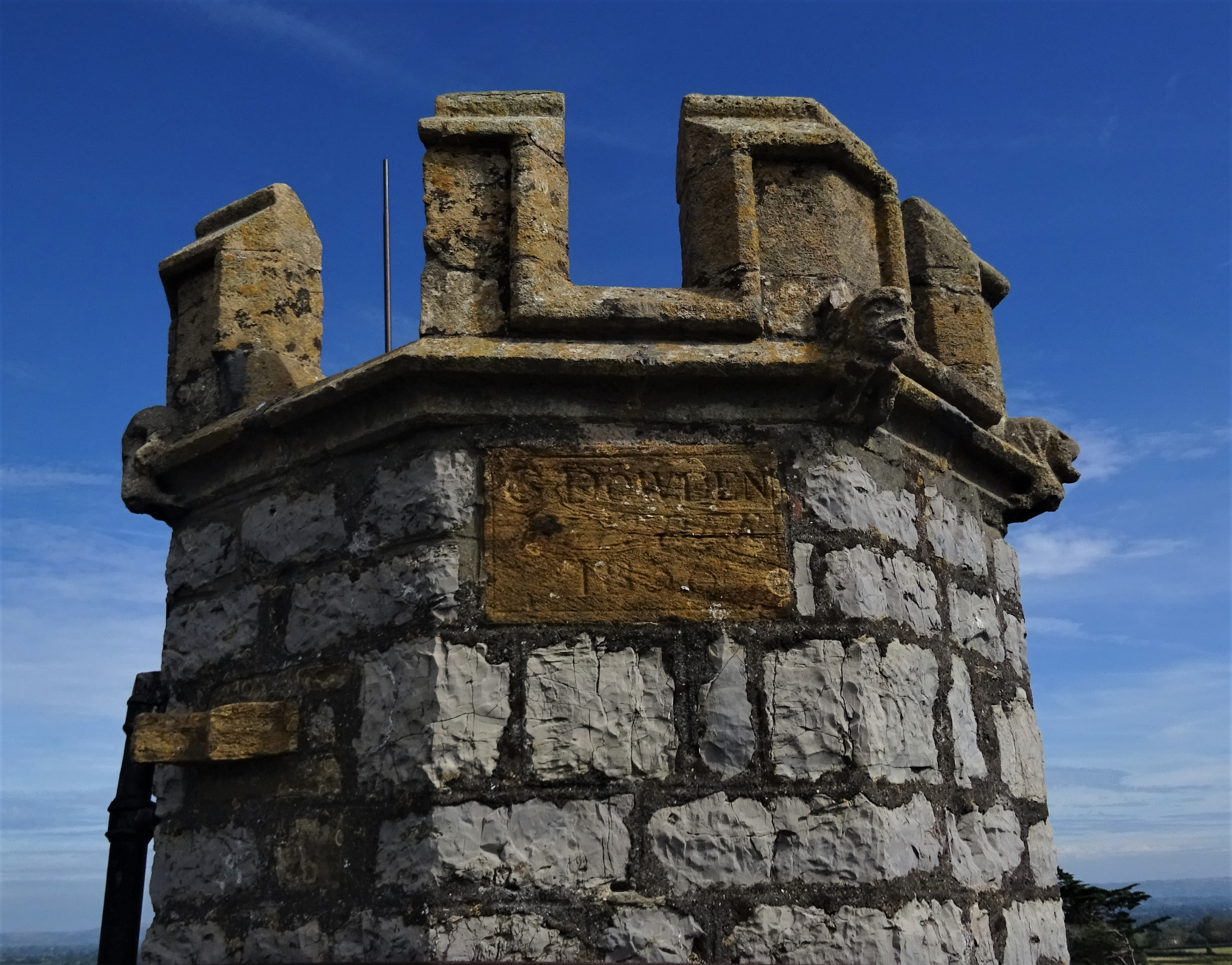
The Observatory

Stradling was a Freemason and a member of the 'Lodge of Perpetual Friendship in Bridgewater. This refectory has 'a black and white stone floor, bordered with blue similar to those at Freemasons' Lodges, but it is not known if the room was ever used for Masonic rituals. Stradling employed a Mr William Halleday as a warden, living in the Gothic Cottage.

After Stradling's death much of his extensive collection was dispersed and the priory left for a time to deteriorate. A catalogue of his collection still exists.

The first buildings are in Gothic style and a Tudor style used for the later additions with a mock-military theme. These additional buildings were added towards the mid 19th century and finally some 20th century alterations and additions were added, such as the attached garage and outbuildings to the east.

=== The Pleasure gardens ===
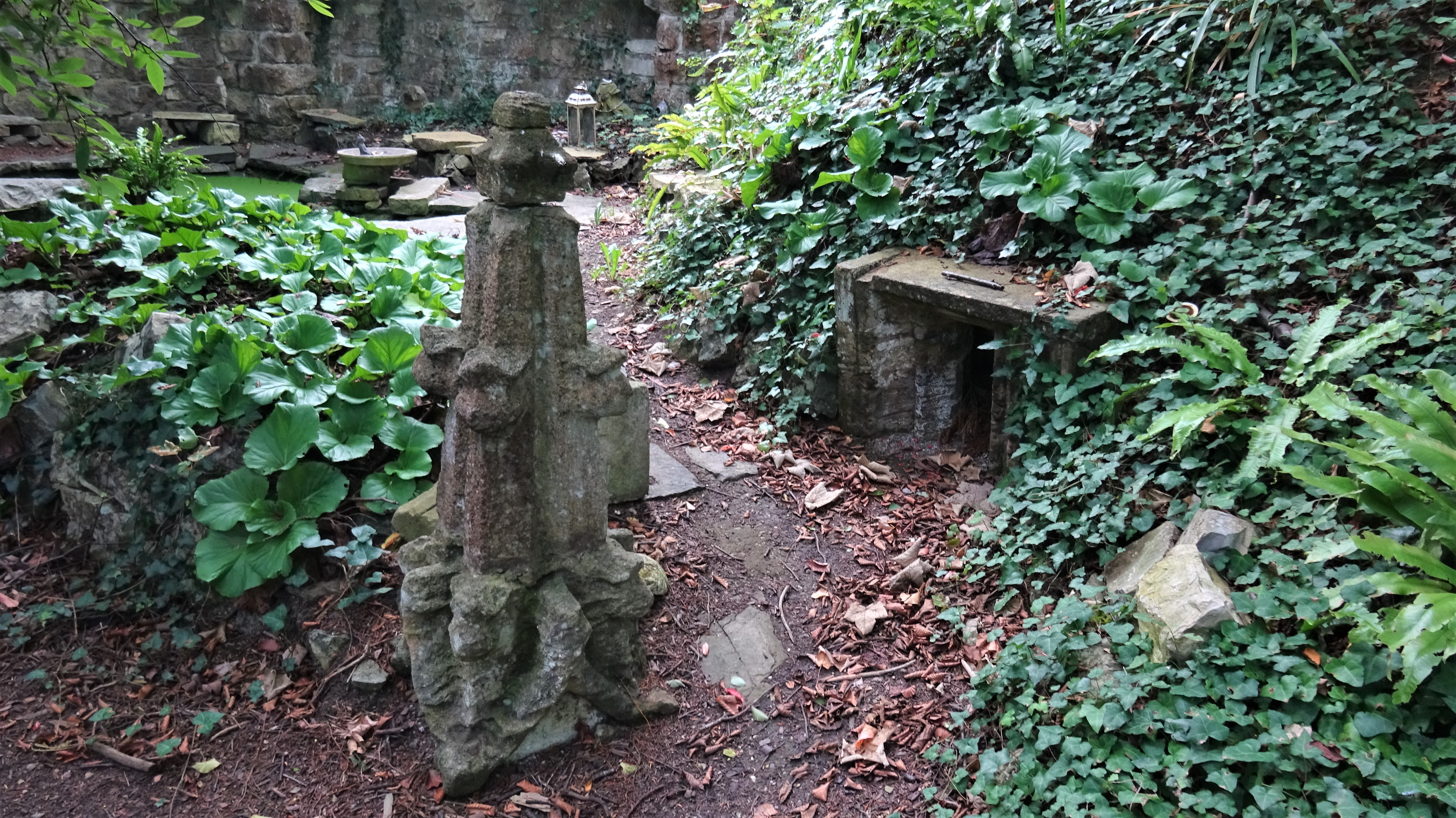
Pleasure garden features collected by William Stradling.

A wooded pleasure ground is located to the west of the folly tower and this also housed items from Stradling's collection. The gardens are laid out on a slope with a tall retaining wall behind running parallel to the Bath Road that forms its south boundary. In 1839 Stradling published a book titled 'Description of the Priory of Chilton-Super-Polden'. He calls the grotto 'Pocock's Cell' after "a most extraordinary character, who for many years resided in a cavern a quarter of a mile from this spot." This anchorite's cavern, now collapsed, was "situated at the end of a long, deep, and narrow gulley, almost covered with briars: through which the stream runs that supplies Ford Mill". Pocock is described as the Robin Hood of this area, and he records an old rhyme: "Rvnne mye boyes, rvnne, the moon shynes bryte, Pocock's yn hys cave, hys pvrsse ys lyte; Bytte, whenne thee nygte ys mvrkye ande darke Hee's offe wythe hys steede, blythe as a larke." In the early 20th century Major Kennedy extended the gardens by adding a terrace and lawns to the north of his new house. In 1918 Frederick Bligh Bond was employed by John and Katharine Maltwood, to further extend the house and to add a pond and a bridge into the gardens.

=== The Grotto and tunnel ===
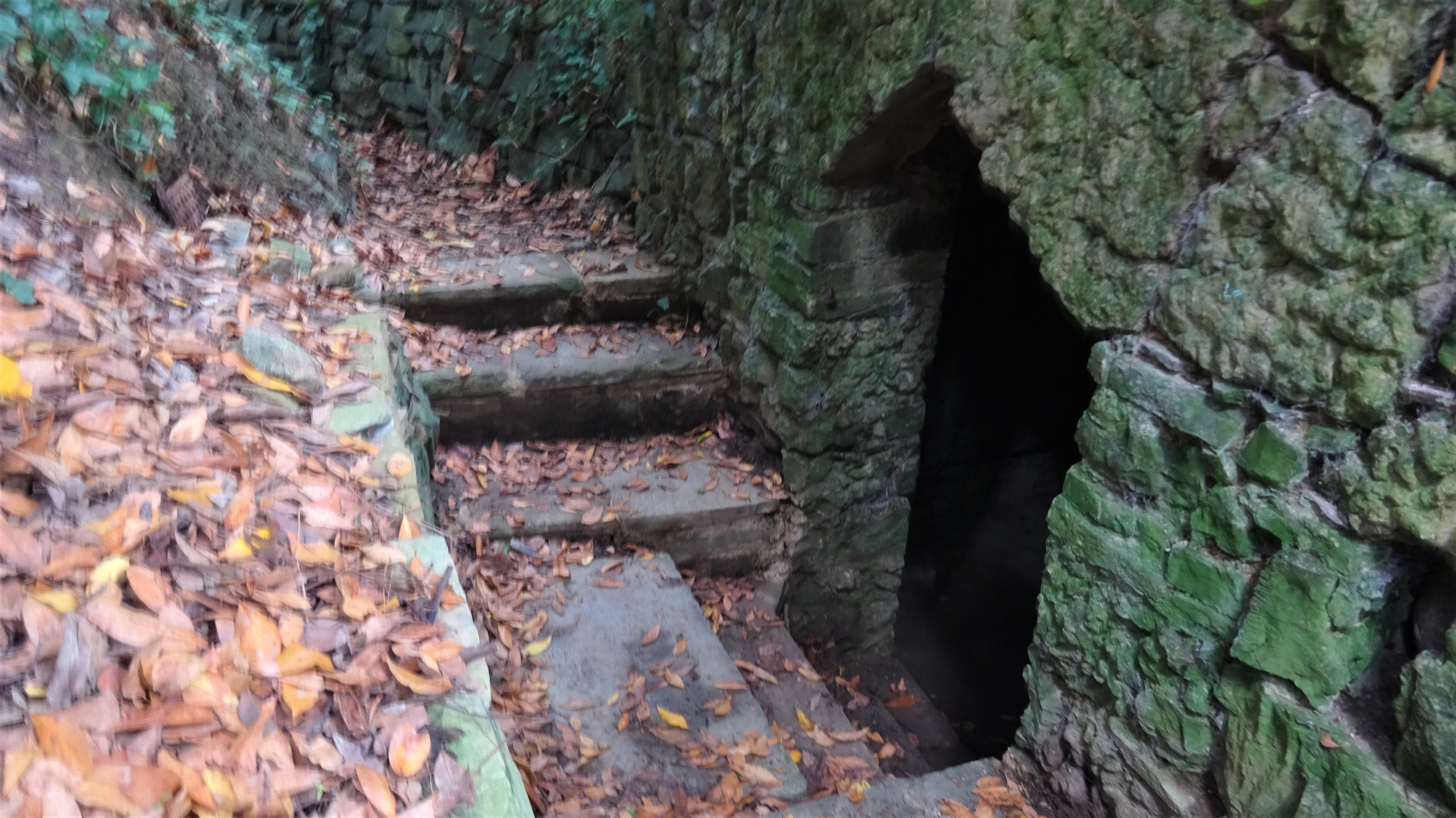
Pocock's Cell

As stated, Circa 1839 Stradling built a rustic single-celled and circular grotto 'Pocock's Cell' with an accompanying gently curving Gothic-arched 'dark' tunnel in his pleasure grounds, both covered with soil. The stonework in both cases is entirely exposed. The grotto has a Gothic-arched entrance, steps leading down, domed ceiling with a small circular opening to let in light and the circular chamber contains three niches with Gothic-arches niches. A wrought iron entrance gate was once present. The structures are Grade II Listed.

=== The Grail Frieze ===
Circa 1920 Katharine made the Grail Frieze which she placed in a position overlooking the gardens. It is inscribed it with a quote from Sir William Dugdale's 1655 'Monasticum Anglicanum.' It is approximately 4m long, constructed of large stone ashlar blocks with an irregular, stepped top, and is inscribed: "About sixty three years After the incarnation Of our Lord St Joseph Of Arimethea, Accompanied by Eleven Other disciples of St Philip was despatched By that apostle into Britain to introduce The Meek and Gentle System of Christianity They settled in the Isle of Avalon." The Grail Frieze may have been intended to have an architectural function.

== Major Francis Kennedy ==
Major Kennedy owned Chilton Priory from 1909 until 1918. In 1909–10 he commissioned Frederick Bligh Bond, an architect, author and psychical researcher to build a larger Tudor-Gothic-revival house on to the north-east side of the early 19th century folly tower, copying the castellated design of the original building.

== The Maltwoods ==
The Priory was home to the artist Katharine Emma Maltwood (1878–1961) née Sapsworth and her husband John from shortly after World War I. She is best known as the discoverer of the Glastonbury Zodiac or Temple of the Stars), a supposed enormous geomantic creation, the inspiration for which came to her in a dream, that was thought to exist around Glastonbury Tor, defined by ancient landscape features.

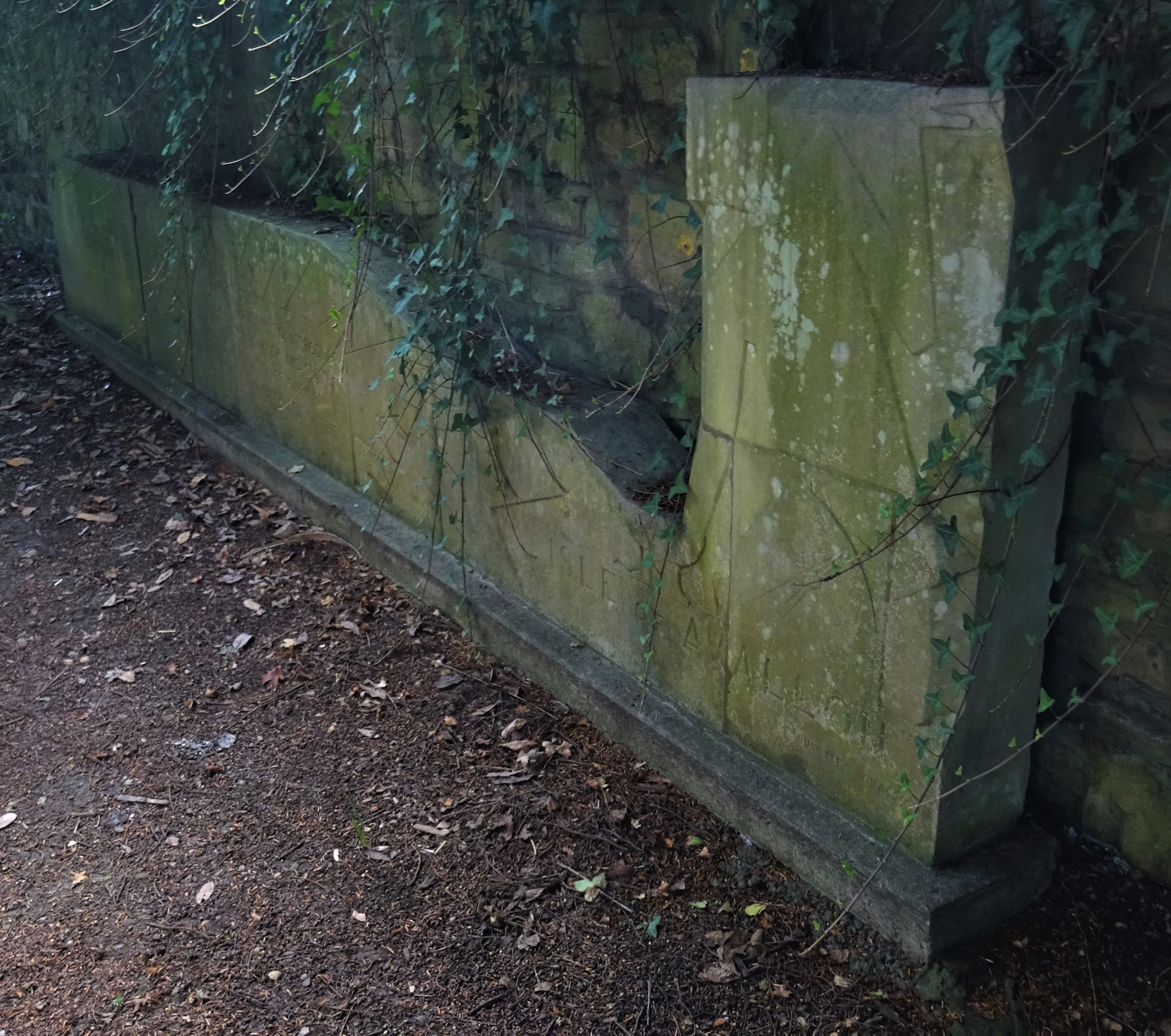
The Grail Frieze

John Maltwood made his fortune in the war as managing director of Oxo Ltd who had a contract to supply combatants with their products. Katharine was a scholar, collector and artist, her early work being greatly influenced by the Arts and Crafts Movement and others. The couple travelled widely and were especially interested in the culture and art of countries such as Arabia, China, Egypt, India, Indonesia, Japan, Korea, North Africa, Palestine and Vietnam.

Katharine believed that William Stradling had deliberately built Chilton Priory on an early British pilgrimage route to Glastonbury and an ancient road 5 feet wide was indeed coincidentally discovered during building works at the priory, running parallel to the then toll road. In the 1920s she became increasingly interested in ancient mythology, religious mysticism and spirituality. She made a detailed study of medieval Arthurian legends, in particular the visit by Joseph of Arimathea bearing the Holy Grail to Glastonbury. Katharine's study was in the small room at the top of the west tower.

In 1935 the couple moved from Chilton Priory and in 1938 they sold it and moved to Canada. A number of others occupied the priory, however the Bath Road became increasingly busy, detracting from the privacy of the property. After a long period of disuse in 2015 the estate was sold at auction and Chilton Priory is now privately owned.
