= Landscape zodiac =

Map of the stars on a gigantic scale

A landscape zodiac (or terrestrial zodiac) is a purported map of the stars on a gigantic scale, formed by features in the landscape, such as roads, streams and field boundaries. Perhaps the best known alleged example is the Glastonbury Temple of the Stars, situated around Glastonbury in Somerset, England. The temple is thought by some to depict a colossal zodiac.

== Theory ==
The theory was first put forward in 1935 by Katherine Maltwood, an artist who "discovered" the zodiac in a vision, and held that the "temple" was created by Sumerians about 2700 BC. Interest was re-ignited in 1969 by Mary Caine in an article in the magazine Gandalf's Garden.

The landscape zodiac plays an important role in many occult theories. It has been associated with the Celtic Saints, Grail legend and King Arthur (according to some legends buried in Glastonbury).

== Criticism ==
The idea was examined by two independent studies, one by Ian Burrow in 1975 and the other in 1983 by Tom Williamson and Liz Bellamy, using the standard methods of landscape historical research. Both studies concluded that the evidence contradicted the idea. The eye of Capricorn identified by Maltwood was a haystack. The western wing of the Aquarius phoenix was a road laid in 1782 to run around Glastonbury, and older maps dating back to the 1620s show the road had no predecessors. The Cancer boat (not a crab as would be expected) is made up of a network of eighteenth century drainage ditches and paths. There are some Neolithic paths preserved in the peat of the bog formerly comprising most of the area, but none of the known paths match the lines of the zodiac features. There is no support for this theory, or for the existence of the "temple" in any form, from conventional archaeologists or mainstream historians.

== List of landscape zodiacs ==
Beside the Glastonbury arrangement further zodiacs have been alleged in Britain in following years including:

- Kingston upon Thames Zodiac
- The Lizard Zodiac, Cornwall
- Bodmin Moor Zodiac
- The Pumpsaint Zodiac
- Nuthampstead Terrestrial Zodiac
- The Sheffield Zodiac, South Yorkshire

There is rarely a strong scientific case for these discoveries. Their nebulous existence is in many ways similar to urban myths, ufology, or ley lines. They seem to play a part in personal belief systems; see Valentine (2016). Some are intentionally fictional; for example "The Brighton Zodiac" – created by Sally Hurst, based on the streets of that town – features as a plot device in Robert Rankin's novel The Brightonomicon.

== Landscape zodiacs and psychogeography ==
In the walks around the M25 motorway documented in psychogeographer Iain Sinclair's 2003 novel London Orbital, the walkers trace the mythical Kingston upon Thames Zodiac.

== See also ==
- Psychogeography
- The Brightonomicon
