= Knees Up Mother Earth =

2004 novel by Robert Rankin

- Author: Robert Rankin
- Language: English
- Series: The Brentford Trilogy
- Genre: Fantasy
- Publisher: Gollancz
- Publication date: 2004
- Publication place: Great Britain
- Media type: Print (Hardcover and Paperback)
- Pages: 439 (paperback edition)
- ISBN: 0-575-07649-6 (paperback edition)
- OCLC: 58828266
- Preceded by: Sex and Drugs and Sausage Rolls
- Followed by: The Brightonomicon

Knees Up Mother Earth is the seventh book by Robert Rankin in the Brentford Trilogy, as well as the second book in The Witches of Chiswick trilogy.

The plot centers on the efforts of Jim Pooley and John Omalley to save Brentford F.C.'s football ground from demolition as part of a satanic conspiracy to awake the serpent from the Garden of Eden. Many of the events in the book are based on a real campaign, in which Rankin himself was involved, to save the ground from being purchased by property developers.

The title is taken from the first album by Knights Of The Occasional Table, released in 1993. It is also a take off of the famous song "Knees Up Mother Brown".
