= Douglas Patrick George =

Canadian visual artist (born 1943)

- Born: November 23, 1943; Victoria, British Columbia, Canada
- Died: June 8, 2025 (aged 81); Victoria, British Columbia, Canada
- Education: Camosun College, University of Victoria, Middlesbrough Art College
- Known for: visual artist, educator

Douglas Patrick "Pat" George RCA (November 23, 1943 – June 8, 2025) was a Canadian visual artist from Victoria, British Columbia.

== Biography ==
Born 1943 in Victoria, British Columbia, Pat George was a graduate of the University of Victoria. Following post-graduate studies at Middlesbrough Art College Pat returned to Victoria to support the University of Victoria Fine Arts Department sculpture program as chief technician.

George died in Victoria, British Columbia, on 8 June 2025, at the age of 82. He is a posthumous member of the Royal Canadian Academy of Arts (RCA).

== Career ==
George primarily worked as a printmaker and specialized in water-soluble silkscreen. He also worked in hand lithography, etching, and block printing.

Outside of the arts, George was a passionate fly fisher, and an advocate for Pacific Salmon conservation and the environment. Fish, fishing, rivers, and nature became significant themes in Pat's prints and sculptures from the 1980s.

=== Pool and Rapid ===
In 1997, George illustrated a limited edition reprint of Pool and Rapid by Canadian writer and conservationist Roderick Haig-Brown. Haig-Brown published two editions in his lifetime, and refused to permit any subsequent editions. This limited edition of the novel was authorized by the Haig-Brown family to coincide with the twentieth anniversary of Haig-Brown's death. Haig-Brown was also the subject of a retrospective curated by George at the University of Victoria Legacy Art Galleries.

=== University of Victoria Visual Arts building ===
In 1990 George was appointed by the University of Victoria to oversee the design and construction of a new Visual Arts building. The building was purpose-built for the visual arts featuring a gallery, studios, a library, and metal and wood shops. It was also designed to include an integrated media lab for digital art (Studios for Integrated Media).

=== Exhibitions ===
George's work, primarily as a silkscreen printer, has been exhibited in numerous international print biennials and group exhibitions including, but not limited to: 13th International Biennials of Graphic Arts (Ljubljana, 1979), 2nd Canadian Print Biennale (Edmonton, 1980), 4th International Graphic Print Biennial (Hermitage, Belgium, 1983), 15th International Biennials of Graphic Arts (Ljubljana, 1983), International Print Exhibition (Taipei, 1984), Northwest Printmakers tour (Australia, 1984), National Defense Pacific Rim Exhibition (Japan, 1987 & 1997), and "Small Images" (Abu Dhabi, 1998).

George has been the subject of a solo exhibition at the University of Victoria Legacy Art Galleries and featured in an Alumni exhibition in 1983.

George has also curated multiple exhibitions at the University of Victoria Legacy Art Galleries, such as an Alumni exhibition in 2002. As President of the Victoria Arts Council, he curated Look 93.

=== Collections ===
George's work is in the permanent collections of Art Gallery of Greater Victoria, Burnaby Art Gallery, Camosun College, Canadian Scottish Regiment (Princess Mary's), University of Victoria Legacy Art Galleries, and Chulalongkorn University

== See also ==
List of Canadian artists
