= Langdale (surname) =

Langdale is a surname, possibly taken from place names meaning "long valley", such as Great and Little Langdale. Notable people with the name include:

- Alban Langdale or Langdaile (1532–1580), English Roman Catholic churchman
- Baron Langdale, a title used in the British peerage
- Charles Langdale, formerly Stourton (1787–1868), British politician
- Doug Langdale (born 1969), American screenwriter etc.
- George Langdale (1916–2002), English cricketer and schoolmaster
- Jane A. Langdale (born 1960), British botanist and academic
- Mark Langdale (born 1954), American businessman and ambassador
- Pascal Langdale (born Pascal Langlois), English actor
- Stella Langdale (1880–1976), English and Canadian artist
