= Apocalypso =

Apocalypso may refer to:

== Music ==
=== Albums ===
- Apocalypso (The Motels album), 2011
- Apocalypso (The Presets album), 2008
- Apokalipso, 1996 album by Darko Rundek

=== Songs ===
- "Apocalypso", a 1980 song by The Monochrome Set
- "Apocalypso", a 1984 song by Mental As Anything
- "The Apocalypso", a 1985 song by Singing Fools
- "Apocalypso", a 1986 song by Wishbone Ash
- "Apocalypso", a 1994 song by Jimmy Buffett
- "Apokalipso", a 1996 song by Darko Rundek
- "Apocalypso", a 2005 song by Mew
- "Apocalypso", a 2014 song by Dave Weckl & Jay Oliver
- "Apocalypso", a 2016 song by Wizo

== Novels ==
- Apocalypso (novel), a 1998 novel by Robert Rankin
