= The Brightonomicon =

2005 novel by Robert Rankin

- Author: Robert Rankin
- Illustrator: Robert Rankin
- Cover artist: Robert Rankin
- Language: English
- Series: The Brentford Trilogy
- Genre: Fantasy novel
- Publisher: Victor Gollancz Ltd
- Publication date: 2005
- Publication place: United Kingdom
- Media type: Print (hardback & paperback)
- Pages: 404 pp (paperback edition)
- ISBN: 0-575-07773-5 (paperback edition)
- OCLC: 65203273
- Preceded by: Knees Up Mother Earth

The Brightonomicon is a novel by British fantasy author Robert Rankin. The title parodies that of the fictional grimoire Necronomicon from the Cthulhu Mythos. The author lives in Brighton, England, and the book is set in an accurate fictional depiction of the town. The book is based on "The Brighton Zodiac", a map consisting of carriageway constellations found in the city of Brighton and Hove, similar to the purported landscape zodiacs of Glastonbury and Kingston. The 2010 edition features a new cover design and internal illustrations by Rankin himself, who studied at the Ealing School of Art and worked briefly as an illustrator in the 1970s.

== Synopsis ==
The novel is set in Brighton, and concerns the grand high magus Hugo Rune (AKA The Reinventor of the Ocarina, the Mumbo Gumshoe, the Hokus Bloke, the Cosmic Dick, the Guru's Guru, the Perfect Master, the Lad Himself) and his quest to solve the mystery of the Brighton zodiac, with the aid of his amnesia-struck assistant, Rizla (revealed at the conclusion of the novel to be Jim Pooley of The Brentford Trilogy). They are opposed in the novel by Rune's arch foe, the evil Count Otto Black.

The following cases are featured:-

Case	Description	Connection
The Hound of the Hangletons	Hugo Rune and the amnesiac Rizla are hired to investigate a strange lost dog, and Rune reveals to Rizla the secret of the Chronovision, a television that allows the user to witness any event in history	The lost dog of the original case
The Curious Case of the Centenary Centaur	While attending a lecture on the size of the universe with Hugo Rune, Rizla is captured by a group of demented doctors seeking to dissect him for organ transplants, and a centaur is unleashed	A centaur appears from a fairy mound
The Monstrous Mystery of the Moulsecoomb Crab	A conversation with a bog troll about his dead brother leads to Rizla and Rune learning of a terrible plot by the Secret Government to bring down the Royal Family with the aid of a group of space crabs	The crabs originate from a distant nebula
The Lark of the Lansdowne Lioness	When a statue of Queen Victoria begins to cry tears of real Earl Grey Tea, Rune alone knows that a nightmare from the past is about to be unleashed	The 'Lioness' is Queen Victoria, who according to Rune was the reincarnation of King Richard the Lionheart
The Curious Case of the Woodingdean Chameleon	With Rune away on business, it is up to Rizla to avert an assassination attempt at a game of croquet while posing as fictional private detective Lazlo Woodbine	Rizla initially believes that the case refers to Count Otto Black in disguise at the Withdean Stadium- identified as 'Woodingdean' by a barman by accident-, but Rune later claims that it referred to Rizla himself (Due to him being in disguise and continuing the running gag of Lazlo Woodbine's name being mispronounced)
The Scintillating Story of the Sackville Scavenger	Attending the opening of a nudist theme restaurant with Rune (All other Brighton restaurants no longer accepting Rune's presence), Rizla is shocked to witness a group of dead rock stars dining with them	The scavenger is Robert Johnson, who aided the world around him with his music
The Fantastic Adventure of the Foredown Man	While attending a garden party, Rizla witnesses the apparent murder of Lord Jeffrey – despite the fact that the man in question vanished over a hundred years earlier – and his various relatives subsequently begin to die in various horrible manners	Lord Jeffrey was the forefather of the others
The Baffling Business of the Bevendean Bat	Reports of lost cats in the Bevendean area, coupled with radioactive doves, multiple roaring animals at regular intervals, and an encounter with an exploding uniped in the bar The Really Small Atlantean, lead to a confrontation between Rune and the evil Count Otto Black about a modern-day version of Noah's Ark	The bar's true name is the Bevendean Bathyscaphe
The Sensational Sage of the Saltdean Stallion	While at a party in Lewes, Rune is apparently killed as a sacrifice to reveal the location of the Chronovision, leaving Rizla to escape Count Otto Black's followers with the aid of an urban legend	The 'Stallion' is Norris Styver, who became trapped in Lewes's complicated street system and could not escape
The Birdman of Whitehawk	The Chronovision now recovered after a trip into the Forbidden Zones, Rune and Rizla must tackle the mysterious apparitions that plague their current host	The Birdman is a native-American/Indian chief, Chief Whitehawk, who provides Rune and Rizla with accommodation
The Wiseman of Withdean	Rizla is forced to disguise himself as a woman as he and Rune search for the last descendant of Jesus Christ at a heavy metal concert	The Wiseman is Lord Tobes, the last descendant of Jesus
The Concluding Chaotic Conundrum of the Coldean Cat	Their forces gathered, Rune and Rizla prepare for the final confrontation with Count Otto Black and for their final parting after a long year of adventures	Coldean is Tobes' recently-lost cat

== Audio adaptation ==
The book was adapted into a 13-part full-cast audio drama in 2008 by Hokus Bloke Productions and BBC Audiobooks, starring Jason Isaacs, Martin Jarvis, Mark Wing-Davey, Sarah Douglas, Andy Serkis, Ben Miller and Michael Fenton Stevens, along with co-Executive Producers David Warner and Rupert Degas.

The audio series was re-edited into 28-minute, 30-minute episodes which was broadcast on the BBC digital and online radio station BBC7. The 13 half-hour episodes were originally broadcast at 18:30 UK Time (with a 00:30 repeat) on Saturdays from 23 August 2008 to 15 November 2008, with each episode being available on the BBC iPlayer for six days after broadcast. The series has been repeated a number of times subsequently. It won eZine The Hub's 2008 Award for "Best Comedy (Audio)".

=== Cast ===
Role	Actor	Role	Actor
Hugo Rune	David Warner	Rizla & Others	Rupert Degas
Count Otto Black	Andy Serkis	Narrator	Michael Fenton Stevens
Fangio	Mark Wing-Davey	Tobes De Valois	Jason Isaacs
Bartholomew The Bog-Troll, aka Capt. Moulsecoomb	Ben Miller	Colonel Mortimer & Inspectre Sherringford Hovis	Martin Jarvis OBE
Lazlo Woodbine, Clant, Doomsayer & Us Voice-Over	Kerry Shale	Nurse Hearse, Lady in the Straw Hat & Old Lady	Sarah Douglas
Professor Nessor	Patrick Barlow	Norris Styver, The Devil & Paul The Student	Kevin Eldon
Inspector Hector & Quentin Vambury-Greystoke	Brian Murphy	Jeffrey Primark, Isambard Kingdom-Come & The Priest	Jonathan Cecil
Kelly-Anne Sirjan	Katherine Parkinson	Chief Whitehawk & Leon	Rich Fulcher
Queen Mother, Pa Anncr, Medic, Susan The Student	Kate O'Sullivan	Stan Post, Lewes Tour Guide & Medic	Iain Lee
Nigel Fairborough-Countless, Sam The Zombie & Maitre D	Steve Oram	Edward Marzipan-Fudge, Bill The Zombie & Morris The Novice	Tom Meeten
Sir Burberry Spaniel-Fondler, Henchmen & Doorman	Ricky Grover	Hubert The Tramp, Butler, Hotel Manager + Others	Simon Gregor
Doctor Proctor & Scottish Groundsman	Steven Cree	Robert Johnson & Croquet Commentator	Ben Onwukwe
Jimi Hendrix & American Gangster	Colin McFarlane	Father Ernetti, Waiter, Tailor, Mario & Croquet Commentator	Johnny Daukes
Danbury Collins & Mister Mate	Danny Eastman	Janet Orion	Tamsyn Challenger
The Monk	Elliott Stein	Cabbies & Himself	Robert Rankin
Announcer & Mail Van Driver	Graham Rogers	Girl in Bar & Young Lady in Pub	Laurie Buckley
Ahab The Space Crab & Ministry of Serendipity Voice-Over	Neil Gardner	Hugo Rune's Biggest Fan	Jay Francis (who won the role through an online competition)
