= The Hollow Chocolate Bunnies of the Apocalypse =

2002 novel by Robert Rankin

- Author: Robert Rankin
- Language: English
- Genre: Fantasy
- Publisher: Gollancz
- Publication date: 2002
- Publication place: United Kingdom
- Media type: Print (Hardcover & Paperback)
- Pages: 352 (hardcover edition)
- ISBN: 0-575-07313-6 (hardcover edition)
- OCLC: 59428681
- Followed by: The Toyminator

The Hollow Chocolate Bunnies of the Apocalypse is a novel by the British author Robert Rankin. It is Rankin's 24th novel and his first for new publishers Gollancz. It is set in Toy City, a place where toys are alive and the characters from nursery rhymes are local celebrities. It is followed by a sequel, "The Toyminator".

The novel is expanded from a throwaway line in Rankin's previous novel The Fandom of the Operator, which refers to recurring character Lazlo Woodbine investigating the murder of nursery rhyme characters in Toy City.

== Plot summary ==
Jack is all set to discover the city beyond his small town. He meets a farmer on his way who warns him against going to the city. Jack however turns a deaf ear and continues his journey. The farmer tries to kill him for his meal, but Jack eventually escapes with his horse, leaving the hungry farmer in the pit.

When he reaches the city he realises that it is populated by toys. He meets a wooden chef at a bar, and realises his horse has been stolen. Jack sets out to search for his horse, but he is hit by someone unknown and he faints on the ground. He is awoken by a teddy bear, Eddie, who is a private detective and the assistant of Bill Winkie (Wee Willie Winkie). Eddie offers Jack partnership in his detective firm, as Bill Winkie is missing.

Jack is still shaken by the fact that toys can actually talk and walk and feel like humans, but eventually he comes on terms with it. Eddie informs him that something is wrong in Toy City - someone is killing the rich and famous PPPs: Preadolescent Poetic Personalities.

These PPPs have become rich due to the royalties they receive for their poems, like Humpty Dumpty, Little Miss Muffet, Mary Mary Quite Contrary and Old King Cole. While on their quest to find the murderer, several PPPs are killed. Humpty Dumpty is boiled with a lens above his pool, Bill Winkie – cheated out of the rights to his nursery rhyme by the writer, but a natural detective – simply vanishes while investigating the case, Little Boy Blue is pierced with his crook – the crook impaling him in the rear and exiting through his mouth, Jack Spratt is fried in his ex-wife's diner, Little Tommy Tucker explodes when a bomb is dropped down his throat as he sings a high note, Little Jack Horner is stuffed with jam and Mother Goose is slit open. In all the cases the only clues are hollow chocolate bunnies left at the scene.

In their investigation, Eddie and Jack realise that the killer is an evil twin of God-like figure 'Anders Anders' and is called 'Sredna Sredna'. He is the one who had absconded with 'The Manual' (Holy Scripts) and 'The Maguffin', which lets the person get entry into the Toy City from other dimensions.

When Jack is confronted by the killer, Sredna reveals that he manufactures lifelike toys who do as their owners command. He plans to rule the world, as he feels that God is too busy creating new worlds and has forgotten this one. He has created toys of Hitler and the President of the USA in order to achieve these aims. Sredna almost kills Eddie and Jack. However, they are saved by Jack's lover, Jill.

In the end, Jack is made a prince and paid a hefty sum by the royal PPPs and Eddie is made the Mayor by Anders Anders.

== Reception ==
A review in Entertainment Weekly said, "Rankin more than lives up to his deliriously inventive title (a reference to the killer's calling card). If he spoils his chance at a timeless classic with a too-topical ending, well, by then we've had much too much fun to really mind."

Publishers Weekly recommended the book to fans of The Hitchhiker's Guide to the Galaxy series and British humour, explaining: "Although the story is wickedly clever and the payoff is a great and satisfying surprise, the real delight comes from watching Rankin work his linguistic magic: characters talk in hilariously circular and self-aware dialogue, and puns and wordplay are packed into the prose like sardines in a tin."

== Awards ==
The Hollow Chocolate Bunnies of the Apocalypse was the winner of the 2003 SFX Magazine Best Novel Award.
