= Waiting for Godalming =

- Author: Robert Rankin
- Language: English
- Genre: Fantasy novel
- Publisher: Doubleday
- Publication date: 2000
- Publication place: United Kingdom
- Media type: Print (Hardback & Paperback)
- Pages: 279 pp (hardcover edition)
- ISBN: 0-385-60057-7 (hardcover edition)
- OCLC: 44185096

Waiting for Godalming (2000) is the 22nd book by Robert Rankin. Its title parodies that of Samuel Beckett's play Waiting For Godot.

Waiting for Godalming tells the story of the ultimate murder case: God himself has been killed in a dark alley. Lazlo Woodbine, famous fifties private eye sets out to solve the case. The prime suspects are Colin, God's other son who has been left out of the Bible and Eartha, His wife - who hired Lazlo in the first place to solve the case. The second plot line is about Icarus Smith, who is trying to find out why demons are walking the earth. As might be expected, these lines knot together in a surprising way.
