= The Antipope =

Novel by Robert Rankin

- First edition
- Author: Robert Rankin
- Language: English
- Series: The Brentford Trilogy
- Genre: Fantasy novel
- Publisher: Pan Books and Corgi Adult
- Publication date: 1981 (Pan), 1991 (Corgi)
- Publication place: United Kingdom
- Media type: Print (Paperback)
- Pages: 249 (Pan edition); 288 (Corgi edition)
- ISBN: 978-0-330-26503-4 (Pan edition); ISBN 978-0-552-13841-3 (Corgi edition)
- OCLC: 16539882
- Followed by: The Brentford Triangle

The Antipope is a comic fantasy novel by the British author Robert Rankin. It is Rankin's first novel, and the first book in the Brentford Trilogy which, as of 2020, consists of 10 novels. The book was first published in 1981 by Pan Books, and from 1991 by Corgi books, an imprint of Transworld Publishers. Although typically found in the science fiction section of bookshops, it is a difficult novel to categorise; Rankin himself joked that he wanted to create a new genre of fiction, called "Far Fetched Fiction", so that he would have his own bookshelf in Smiths.

== Plot ==
The Antipope charts Brentford's anti-heroes' (Jim Pooley and John Omally) drinking, work avoidance, womanising, and further drinking as they try to foil the eponymous antipope in his demonic attempt to establish a new Holy See.

== Characters in "The Antipope" ==
- John Omally
- Jim Pooley
- Pope Alexander VI The Anti-Pope, also appearing as a tramp of dreadful aspect
- Professor Slocombe
- Neville, the part-time barman
- Archroy
- Norman Hartnell
- Soap Distant
- Old Pete

== Literary significance & criticism ==
During the 1970s, Rankin wrote a number of short stories. Having been introduced to graphic designer Alan Aldridge, then at Aurelia Entertainment, he submitted some of those stories in the hope of getting a publishing deal. Despite liking the work, Aldridge was of the opinion that the short stories were unpublishable, and asked Rankin to write a novel. Rankin spent the next six months merging several of his short stories, resulting in The Antipope, which Aldridge took to Pan Books who bought and subsequently published the novel.

In spite of Aldridge's and Pan's initial enthusiasm, Pan declined to publish any novels beyond the first three books of The Brentford Trilogy. Rankin's editor moved to another publisher, and his writing career came to a halt until 1988 when Sphere Books (under the Abacus imprint) reprinted the original trilogy in one volume (ISBN 978-0-349-10028-9).

Despite this inauspicious start, Rankin and The Antipope have since attained something of a cult status, with the following two review extracts printed on the back cover of the Corgi edition:

'Wonderful...A heady mix of Flann O'Brien, Douglas Adams, Tom Sharpe and Ken Campbell, but with an inbuilt irreverence and indelicacy that is unique – and makes it the long-awaited, heavy smoker's answer to The Lord of the Rings' – Time Out

'Wonderfully entertaining...reads like a Flann O'Brien rewrite of Close Encounters' – City Limits

== Cover art ==
Later Corgi edition (1991) designed by the author

The original Pan Books release of the novel features a different front cover by artist Alistair Graham. It depicts five of the main characters of the book, with The Flying Swan in the background and the figure of the resurrected Pope Alexander VI looming ominously over everything.

The stylised drawing of a bull on the more recent Corgi cover represents the red bull of the Borgia coat of arms, with Archroy's five magic beans scattered across it, and was designed by the author for the later edition.

== Other media ==
In addition to the paperback novels, The Antipope has been released as an audiobook, first published by Smartpass Ltd in October 1993 (ISBN 978-1-903362-24-2) and narrated by Rankin himself. The audio book stars David Gooderson, Lucy Robinson, and Nick Murchie.

Oneword Radio broadcast the Smartpass production of the novel, read by Robert Rankin, in 21 instalments, during November 2006.

In 2004, the Dreaming Theatre Company produced a stage adaptation of The Antipope; the production toured across the UK playing in venues and festivals. It was adapted by Scott Harrison and Lee Harris, and starred the following cast:

1. John Omally – Aidan McCarthy
2. Jim Pooley – Andrew Welch
3. The Antipope – John Buckeridge
4. Professor Slocombe – Roger Andrew
5. Neville, the part-time barman – Scott Harrison
6. Archroy – Matthew Freeman
7. Norman Hartnell – Jamie McKeller

It toured as a double bill with Eric, the first ever stage adaptation of this Terry Pratchett Discworld novel, also by writers Scott Harrison and Lee Harris. Both plays featured the same actors.
