= Apocalypso (novel) =

1998 novel by Robert Rankin

- Author: Robert Rankin
- Language: English
- Genre: Horror, Fantasy novel
- Publisher: Doubleday
- Publication date: 1998
- Publication place: United Kingdom
- Media type: Print (Hardcover & Paperback)
- Pages: 289 pp (hardcover edition)
- ISBN: 0-385-40943-5 (hardcover edition)
- OCLC: 40988368
- Preceded by: The Dance of the Voodoo Handbag
- Followed by: Snuff Fiction

Apocalypso is a novel by the British author Robert Rankin.

A crack team of paranormal investigators are dispatched to recover a crashed spaceship from the bottom of the Pacific Ocean.

According to his autobiography, I, Robert, Rankin was unhappy with how he portrayed certain characters within this story. Before releasing the book on his own E-imprint, he edited out numerous jokes which he felt to be unsavory.
