= The Toyminator =

2006 novel by Robert Rankin

The Toy-minator
- First edition cover
- Author: Robert Rankin
- Cover artist: Sally Hurst
- Language: English
- Genre: Fantasy novel
- Publisher: Gollancz
- Publication date: 2006
- Publication place: Great Britain
- Media type: Print (hardback & paperback)
- Pages: 320 pp (hardcover edition)
- ISBN: 0-575-07010-2 (hardcover edition)
- OCLC: 65468291
- Preceded by: The Hollow Chocolate Bunnies of the Apocalypse

The Toyminator is a novel by the British author Robert Rankin. It is the sequel to The Hollow Chocolate Bunnies of the Apocalypse, winner of the 2003 SFX Magazine Best Novel Award. It follows the adventures of Eddie Bear and his sidekick Jack.

== Synopsis ==
Eddie Bear has been deposed as the mayor of Toy City and the toymaker has taken away his modifications. Jill has left Jack and he is now working in Nadine's Diner. One day, a drunk Eddie witnesses bright flashing lights and a copy of him appear in an alleyway. He attributes it to being drunk. Soon after, the toys in the toy city are dying. When touched, the toys crumble to dust. Jack and Eddie start investigating even though Jack doesn't plan on it. Their investigations end up getting them in trouble with Inspector Bellis who arrests them on trumped up charges but lets them go in return for them promising to solve the mystery.

With the help of the Phantom of the Opera and a calculating pocket called Wallah that Jack steals from Tinto, Jack and Eddie discover that a pair of their doppelgängers are sucking the souls of the toys. They try to stop them in the opera but fail. While pursuing the doppelgangers by following their smell, Jack and Eddie come to the old and dead Toy Town. There they discover that the hiding place of the doppelgangers is Bill Winkle's old house. They get captured by a UFO (flying saucer) trying to get away from Bill's house and experiments are done on them by the aliens, including implanting implants up their bottoms.

Eddie decides to get Jack hypnotised by a hypnotist at the circus. After listening to what Jack had to say, the hypnotist becomes catatonic and Jack and Eddie escape with the hypnotists wallet. With proof of alien's involvement, they decide go back to Bill's house in Toy Town and follow the doppelgangers. This time again the flying saucer tries to attack them and Jack destroys it by firing at it and throwing grenades that he stole from Bill's house. The doppelgangers go through "The Second Big O" – the second O in the sign that reads "TO TO LA" which stood for TOYTOWNLAND.

Eddie and Jack go through the second big O themselves and end up on the other side in the world of men. When they look back, the sign reads HOLLYWOOD. In the land of them, the instruments they brought with them from Toy City stop working. After meeting with an aspiring actress named Dorothy they visit Golden Chicken Diner for a cup of coffee and discover that the dead toys from Toy City are being given away for free in the diner. To find out the person responsible behind the chain, they decide to infiltrate the chain of diners by joining it at a low level and rising up the level (following the American Dream). Meanwhile, Eddie is kidnapped by the other Jack and taken to Area 52.

As an assistant chef, Jack's boss, the head chef, tells him that it is impossible to breed as many chickens and eggs that men eat and proves that all chickens served in the diner are artificial. The following day, at the conference, Jack tries to take over the conference and find out the leader but instead gets captured by LAPD. He escapes their custody and frees Dorothy. Together, they steal a squad car and drive madly to escape the chase given by LAPD.

They end up close to Area 52 and go in to investigate. Inside Area 52, the other Eddie reveals to Eddie, who is dying as he is out of Toy City, about the plan by the chickens to take over the land of men (by making them addicted to chicken and then making them fight each other) and Toy City (by sucking the souls of the toys and enslaving the men in Toy City just like the men in the land of men). When LAPD gets to Area 52, Eddie tells the other Eddie to let Jack go outside and give himself up.

The police beat up the other Jack for all the problems caused by Jack and this pleases Eddie as the other Jack was very abusive towards him. At the police station, the other Jack is revealed to be a robot and he escapes the police station, steals a sulphuric acid truck and drives towards Area 52, chased by the LAPD in an armed helicopter and a lone Air Force jet. The chickens fly out with a dozen flying saucers to cross over to Toy City through the Hollywood sign and Jack followed by LAPD and the lone Air Force jet follow them.

There is a big collision at the entrance and half a dozen flying saucers are destroyed along with the robot Jack. The portal is destroyed as well. Once in Toy City, Eddie regains his full strength and Jack and Dorothy who survived the falling elevator in Area 52 (the other Eddie tried to kill them there) attack the other Eddie. Jack shoots the other Eddie as his identity is revealed when he uses a corroborative noun ("as simple as blinking"). The head chicken, a queen, emerges from the body of the other Eddie and Dorothy wrings her neck and kills her.

This is very fortunate because the next queen automatically reverses the previous queen's policies and that is not because she wants to but because of tradition. Toy City is prepared as well because Eddie sent a telepathic message to a space man in a space suit who informed Inspector Bellis who instructed all the toy tanks and others to be armed. All the flying saucers are shot down. Eddie, Jack and Dorothy come out of the lead flying saucer alive. Dorothy is revealed to be a vegetable from a different world, so Jack buries her he expects she will set roots and grow. The book ends with Inspector Bellis telling Eddie that he can influence enough people to get Eddie the position of City Mayor.
