= The Most Amazing Man Who Ever Lived =

- First edition
- Author: Robert Rankin
- Language: English
- Series: Cornelius Murphy Trilogy
- Genre: Fantasy novel
- Publisher: Doubleday
- Publication date: 1995
- Publication place: United Kingdom
- Media type: Print (Hardback) & (Paperback)
- Pages: 318 pp
- ISBN: 0-552-14211-5
- OCLC: 60263111
- Preceded by: Raiders of the Lost Car Park

The Most Amazing Man Who Ever Lived is a novel by British author Robert Rankin. It is the third (and final) book in the Cornelius Murphy trilogy, sequel to The Book of Ultimate Truths and Raiders of the Lost Car Park.

The central story revolves around a 14-year-old schoolboy, Norman, who is killed while trying to summon a demon to grant him wings. Instead of going to Heaven or Hell though, Norman is employed at the Universal Reincarnation Company, set up after God closed down Hell when he realised that nobody could hope to keep the Tenth Commandment. Norman discovers that someone has learnt how to "pre-incarnate" themselves. Constantly being reborn on their original birthdate, with all their knowledge intact, they could be the titular Most Amazing Man Who Ever Lived... or the very Devil himself.
