= East of Ealing =

1984 novel by Robert Rankin

- Author: Robert Rankin
- Publisher: Macmillan
- Publication date: 1984
- ISBN: 9780330282307

East of Ealing is a novel by Robert Rankin published in 1984. It is the third novel in Rankin's Brentford Trilogy.

== Plot summary ==
East of Ealing is a novel in which Pooley and Omally contend with perpetual motion, robots, time travel, Merlin, Sherlock Holmes and an Antichrist fond of microchips.

It is a part of the genre of Far Fetched Fiction, a genre originally created by its author.

== Reception ==
Dave Langford reviewed East of Ealing for White Dwarf #54, and stated that "its best feature is the very funny dialogue of heroes Pooley and Omally"

== Reviews ==
- Review by Lynne Bispham (1993) in Vector 172
- Review by Chris Gilmore (1993) in Interzone, #72 June 1993
- Review [German] by Gerd Frey (1999) in Alien Contact, Nummer 35
