= Raiders of the Lost Car Park =

1994 novel by Robert Rankin

- First edition
- Author: Robert Rankin
- Language: English
- Series: Cornelius Murphy Trilogy
- Genre: Fantasy novel
- Publisher: Doubleday
- Publication date: 28 April 1994
- Publication place: Great Britain
- Media type: Print (Hardcover)
- Pages: 279 pp
- ISBN: 0-385-40418-2
- OCLC: 31411397
- Preceded by: The Book of Ultimate Truths
- Followed by: The Most Amazing Man Who Ever Lived

Raiders of the Lost Car Park is a novel by British author Robert Rankin. It is the second book in the Cornelius Murphy trilogy, sequel to The Book of Ultimate Truths and prequel to The Most Amazing Man Who Ever Lived. It documents the continuing adventures of Cornelius Murphy and his companion Tuppe. The novel was first published by Doubleday in 1994. The book's name is a play on Raiders of the Lost Ark, an Indiana Jones movie.
