= The Book of Ultimate Truths =

1993 novel by Robert Rankin

- First edition
- Author: Robert Rankin
- Language: English
- Series: Cornelius Murphy Trilogy
- Genre: Fantasy
- Publisher: Doubleday
- Publication date: 1993
- Publication place: United States
- Media type: Print (Hardcover)
- Pages: 271 pp
- ISBN: 0-385-40413-1
- OCLC: 29518744
- Followed by: Raiders of the Lost Car Park

The Book of Ultimate Truths is a novel by British author Robert Rankin. The plot revolves around the adventures of Cornelius Murphy and his companion Tuppe. The novel was first published by Doubleday in 1993. It ranked number 5 in the Science Fiction & Fantasy category on The Independent on Sunday bestseller list.

== Plot summary ==
The book begins with Cornelius hired by the mysterious Arthur Kobold, who claims to represent a publishing firm wishing to print a complete copy of The Book of Ultimate Truths, a set of great secrets discovered by Hugo Rune, but suppressed by unknown forces. Cornelius and his schoolfriend Tuppe set out to find the book. They encounter the evil Campbell, who is also seeking to retrieve the lost book, to allow him to return to the Forbidden Zones, areas of the world hidden from humanity (excepting London taxi drivers). The two heroes retrieve the book and return to the Murphy home in Brentford, only to find the Campbell is waiting there for them. It is revealed the Campbell is Cornelius' half-brother, and that their father is Hugo Rune. The Campbell escapes with the key to the Forbidden Zones, a re-invented ocarina. Cornelius and Tuppe pursue him to the nearest entrance to the Zones, but the Campbell's plans are foiled by the arrival of a large gathering of a cult devoted to Hugo Rune. The ocarina is destroyed, as is the Campbell.

Arthur Kobold presents Cornelius with a large cheque as an advance against royalties from the publication of the book. The cheque is revealed to be a trick - Arthur Kobold was in fact working for the denizens of the Forbidden Zones all along. Seemingly foiled, Cornelius then realizes that the map of their journey forms a schematic for the creation of another re-invented ocarina, and along with a London A–Z map showing the locations of the entrances to the Forbidden Zones the heroes are left plotting their next adventure into the unknown.
