= List of compositions by York Bowen =

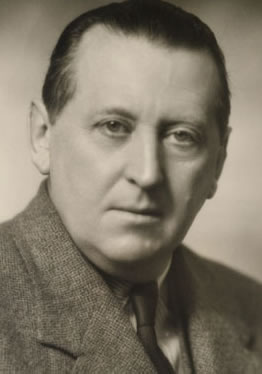
York Bowen in 1935

This is a list of compositions by York Bowen (1884–1961).

== Orchestral ==
- 1902 – Symphony No. 1 in G major, Op.4
- 1902 – Symphonic Poem The Lament of Tasso, Op.5
- 1904 – Concert Overture in G minor, Op.15
- 1905 – Tone Poem Symphonic Fantasia, Op.16
- 1909 – Symphony No. 2 in E minor, Op.31
- 1913 – At the Play, Op.50
- 1920 – Suite, Op.57
- 1922 – Orchestral Poem Eventide, Op.69
- 1929 – Festal Overture in D major, Op.89
- 1940 – Somerset Suite
- 1942 – Symphonic Suite in four movements (third movement lost)
- 1945 – Fantasy Overture on "Tom Bowling", Op.115
- 1949 – Arabesque for harp and string orchestra (lost)
- 1951 – Symphony No. 3 in E minor, Op.137 (lost)
- 1951 – Three Pieces for string orchestra with harp: Prelude to a Comedy, Aubade and Toccata, Op.140 (lost)
- 1957 – Sinfonietta Concertante for brass and orchestra
- 1960 – Miniature Suite for school orchestra
- 1961 – Symphony No. 4 in G (unfinished)

== Solo instrumentalist and orchestra ==
- 1903 – Piano Concerto No.1 in E♭, Op.11
- 1905 – Piano Concerto No.2, Concertstück, in D minor, Op.17
- 1907 – Piano Concerto No.3, Fantasia, in G minor, Op.23
- 1907 – Viola Concerto in C minor, Op.25
- 1913 – Violin Concerto in E minor, Op.33
- 1924 – Rhapsody in D for cello and orchestra, Op.74
- 1929 – Piano Concerto No.4 in A minor, Op.88
- 1955 – Concerto for horn, string orchestra and timpani, Op.150

== Band ==
- The Hardy Tin Soldier

== Chamber music ==
- Three Duos for violin and viola
- Miniature Suite for flute and piano
- Miniature Suite for flute, oboe, 2 clarinets and bassoon
- Soliloquy and Frolic for unaccompanied flute
- Sonata for 2 flutes
- Romance in D♭ major for violin or viola and piano (1900, 1904)
- Sonata in B minor for violin and piano, Op. 7 (1902)
- Fantasia in F major for viola and organ (1903)
- Sonata No. 1 in C minor for viola and piano, Op. 18 (1905)
- Allegro de Concert in D minor for cello or viola and piano (1906)
- Sonata No. 2 in F major for viola and piano, Op. 22 (1906)
- Finale of English Suite for string quartet (1908); from Suite on Londonderry Air co-composed with Frank Bridge, Hamilton Harty, J. D. Davis (John David Davis) and Eric Coates
- Phantasie Trio for violin, cello (or viola) and piano, Op. 24
- Poem in G♭ major for viola, harp and organ, Op. 27 (1912)
- Romance in A major for cello and piano (1908)
- Suite in D minor for violin and piano, Op. 28 (1909)
- Phantasie in E minor for violin and piano, Op. 34 (1911)
- Serenade for violin and piano (1917)
- Valse harmonique for violin and piano (1917)
- String Quartet No. 2 in D minor, Op. 41 No. 2 (c.1918)
- Fantasia ("Fantasie Quartet") in E minor for 4 violas, Op. 41 No. 1 (1907)
- String Quartet No. 3 in G major, Op. 46 (1919)
- Melody on the G-String in G♭ major for violin or viola and piano, Op. 47 (1917)
- Melody for the C-String in F major for viola and piano, Op. 51 No. 2 (1918)
- Phantasy in F major for viola and piano, Op. 54 (1918)
- Two Duets for 2 violas (1920)
- Sonata in A major for cello and piano, Op. 64 (1921)
- Two Preludes for horn and piano (1921)
- Rhapsody Trio in A minor for violin, cello and piano, Op. 80 (1925–1926)
- Quintet in C minor for horn and string quartet, Op. 85 (1927)
- Sonata for oboe and piano, Op. 85 (1927)
- Albumleaf for violin and piano (published 1927)
- Melody for violin and piano (published 1928)
- Suite for Four Cellos (1930)
- Phantasie–Quintet in D minor for bass clarinet and string quartet, Op. 93 (1932)
- Sonata in E♭ major for horn and piano, Op. 101 (1937)
- Allegretto in G major for violin or cello and piano, Op. 105 (published 1940)
- Sonata in F minor for clarinet and piano, Op. 109 (1943)
- Sonata in E minor for violin and piano, Op. 112 (1945)
- Trio in 3 Movements in E minor for violin, cello and piano, Op. 118 (1945)
- Sonata for flute and piano, Op. 120 (1946)
- Sonatina for treble recorder and piano, Op. 121
- Song in F major for violin and piano (1949)
- Bolero in A minor for violin and piano (1949)
- Ballade for oboe, horn and piano, Op. 133
- Rhapsody in G minor for viola and piano, Op. 149 (1955)
- Three Pieces for viola d'amore and piano, Op. 153
- Poem for viola d'amore and piano (1957)
- Piece for Viola in E♭ (1960)
- Introduction and Allegro in D minor for viola d'amore and piano (1961)
- Two Sketches for solo violin, The Clown. The Dragonfly (1961) http://www.musicweb–international.com/classrev/2001/July01/yorkbowen.htm

== Organ ==
- Melody in G minor
- Fantasia in G minor, Op. 136
- Wedding March in F major (1961)

== Piano ==
=== Two Pianos ===
- Ballade
- Two Pieces, Op. 106 (1939)
- Sonata No. 2 in E minor, Op. 107 (1941)
- Waltz in C, Op. 108 (1941)
- Arabesque in F major, Op. 119 (published 1947)
- Theme and Variations, Op. 139 (1951)

=== Piano 4–hands ===
- Suite in Three Movements, Op. 52 (1918)
- Suite No. 2, Op. 71
- 4 Pieces for Piano Duet, Op. 90
- Suite, Op. 111

=== Piano solo ===
- Spare Moments (Books 1 & 2), Op. 1
- Silhouettes, 7 Morceaux Mignons, Op. 2
- Four Pieces, Op. 3
- Sonata No. 1 in B minor, Op. 6 (published 1902)
- Stray Fancies, 4 Little Pieces, Op. 8
- First Rhapsody, Op. 8 (1902)
- Sonata No. 2 in C♯ minor, Op. 9 (1901)
- Concert Study No. 1 in G♭ major, Op. 9 No. 2
- Rhapsody in B minor, Op. 10 (1902)
- Sonata No. 3 in D minor, Op. 12
- Caprice No. 2, Op. 13
- Miniature Suite in C major, Op. 14 (1904)
- Nocturne (1904)
- A Whim, Op. 19 No. 2
- Three Pieces, Op. 20 (1905)
  1. Arabesque
  2. Rêverie d'amour
  3. Bells, An Impression
- Polonaise in F♯ major, Op. 26 No. 2 (1906)
- Humoresque in G major (1908)
- Concert Study No. 1 in F major, Op. 32
- Short Sonata [Piano Sonata No. 4] in C♯ minor, Op. 35 No. 1
- Romance No. 1 in G♭ major, Op. 35 No. 2 (1913)
- Suite No. 3, Op. 38
- Evening Calm in B♭ major (1915)
- Suite Mignonne, Suite No. 4 for Piano, Op. 39 (1915)
- Curiosity Suite, Suite No. 5 for Piano, Op. 42
- Three Sketches, Op. 43 (published 1916)
- Three Miniatures, Op. 44 (1916)
- Romance No. 2 in F, Op. 45 (1917)
- Twelve Studies, Op. 46
- Ballade No. 1 (1919)
- Three Serious Dances, Op. 51 (1919)
- Mood Phases, Op. 52
- Those Children!, 5 Impressions, Op. 55
- Fragments from Hans Andersen, Suite for Piano, Part One, Op. 58
- Fragments from Hans Andersen, Suite for Piano, Part Two, Op. 59
- Fragments from Hans Andersen, Suite for Piano, Part Three, Op. 61
- Variations and Fugue on an Unoriginal Theme, Op. 62
- A Cradle Song, Op. 63
- Sonata No. 5 in F minor, Op. 72 (1923)
- The Way to Polden (An Ambling Tune), Op. 76 (1925)
- Capriccio, Op. 77
- Nocturne in A♭ major, Op. 78 (published 1925)
- Three Preludes, Op. 81
- Berceuse, Op. 83 (1928)
- Rêverie in B major, Op. 86
- Ballade No. 2 in A minor, Op. 87 (published 1931)
- Three Songs without Words, Op. 94 (published 1935)
  1. Song of the Stream
  2. Solitude
  3. The Warning
- Idyll, Op. 97
- Falling Petals, Op. 98 No. 1
- Turnstiles, Op. 98 No. 3
- Twelve Easy Impromptus, Op. 99
- Two Pieces, Op. 100
  1. Ripples, A Short Sketch in F major (1937)
  2. Shadows, Prelude in D major
- Prelude in G minor
- Twenty-Four Preludes in All Major and Minor Keys, Op. 102 (1938, published 1950)
- Three Novelettes, Op. 124 (1947)
- Siciliano (in F major) and Toccatina (in A minor), Op. 128 (1948)
- Fantasia in G minor, Op. 132 (1948)
- Two Intermezzi, Op. 141 (1951)
- Sonatina, Op. 144 (1954)
- Four Bagatelles, Op. 147 (1956)
- Toccata, Op. 155 (1957)
- Partita, Op. 156 (1960)
- Sonata No. 6 in B♭ minor, Op. 160 (1961)

== Vocal ==
- Cordovan Love Song, Op. 68 No. 4; words by George Leveson-Gower
- Four Chinese Lyrics, Op. 48
- The Hidden Treasure; words by George Leveson-Gower
- If You Should Frown; words by George Leveson-Gower
- In June; words by George Leveson-Gower
- Love's Reckoning; words by George Leveson-Gower
- Love and Death; words by George Leveson-Gower
- A Moonlight Night; words by Robert Southey
- Storm Song; words by George Leveson-Gower
- We Two
- The Wind's an Old Woman, Op. 75 No. 1; words by Wilfrid Thorley
