= Nostradamus Ate My Hamster =

1996 book by Robert Rankin

- First edition
- Author: Robert Rankin
- Cover artist: Ian Murray
- Language: English
- Genre: Fantasy novel
- Published: 1996 (Doubleday)
- Publication place: Great Britain
- Media type: Print (Hardcover & Paperback)
- ISBN: 978-0552143554

Nostradamus Ate My Hamster is a fantasy novel by British author Robert Rankin. In it, several seemingly unconnected and nonsensical events come together to make perfect clarity at the end; these include time travel and an attempted alien invasion vaguely orchestrated by Hitler. The title is a reference to the infamous tabloid headline, "Freddie Starr ate my hamster".

== Plot summary ==
The plot centers on the aptly named Russell Nice, stuck in a dead-end job at a movie prop selling business, discovering holographic equipment from the future that allows the holder to create lifelike holograms of any movie star they want. Eventually, he becomes entangled in a mass of deceit, lies, and betrayal, all of which centers on a demon-god with an insect face, and Hitler, who is stuck in the present time with his SS bodyguards, intending to make a film that will influence the world to follow Hitler and his ideals. During his time travel, Russell discovers that the creature has disposed of traditional heroes Jim Pooley and John Omally before its attack; they would normally defend Brentford from the threat the creature posed, but as it exists outside the natural order it is able to destroy them before they can take action against it.

Finding himself unable to simply destroy the film or prevent it being made, Russell decides to use the time-travel belts that Hitler's forces had acquired to establish himself as a major film producer in the present, thus ensuring that he will be the one that Hitler's men bring the film to, allowing him to destroy it before it is released. This victory, due to the temporally active nature of the conflict, apparently erases Russell's struggle, and the novel ends with Jim Pooley and John Omally discussing the story in the Flying Swan as a man who appears to be Russell enters the bar, and begins to talk with an attractive waitress.

== Reception ==
Paul Pettengale reviewed Nostradamus Ate My Hamster for Arcane magazine, rating it a 9 out of 10 overall, and stated that "Is it any good? Why yes. The humour, which is incredibly sick and intensely English at the same time, lollops from improbable situation to extraordinary plot device, stabbing you repeatedly with the fierceness of a stun baton. True, it's not until the end that you can really appreciate the devilishness of the author's mind (though you get some very strong hints on the way), but the journey through the monstrous mass of garbage that is Rankin's psyche is far more enjoyable than reading through anything Pratchet or Adams has ever written. Quite superb."

== Reviews ==
- Review by Chris Gilmore (1996) in Interzone, December 1996
- Review by Chris Amies (1997) in Vector 195
