= Sex and Drugs and Sausage Rolls =

1999 novel by Robert Rankin

- Author: Robert Rankin
- Language: English
- Series: The Brentford Trilogy
- Genre: Fantasy novel
- Publisher: Doubleday and Corgi Adult
- Publication date: 1999 (Doubleday), 2000 (Corgi)
- Publication place: United Kingdom
- Media type: Print (Paperback)
- Pages: 382 (Corgi edition)
- ISBN: 978-0-552-14741-5 (Corgi edition)

Sex and Drugs and Sausage Rolls is a 1999 novel by the British author Robert Rankin. Set in Brentford near London, it is one of the eleven novels in Rankin's Brentford Trilogy. The book features the series' drunken protagonists John Omally and Jim Pooley.

== Plot synopsis ==
John Omally's ambition to be a rock star leads him to manage an odd rock group called Gandhi's Hairdryer.
