= The Dance of the Voodoo Handbag =

1998 novel by Robert Rankin

- First edition
- Author: Robert Rankin
- Language: English
- Genre: Fantasy novel
- Publisher: Doubleday
- Publication date: 1998
- Publication place: United Kingdom
- Media type: Print (Hardcover & Paperback)

The Dance of the Voodoo Handbag is a novel by the British author Robert Rankin that incorporates elements of fantasy and science fiction.
