= Katharine Emma Maltwood =

Artist and author

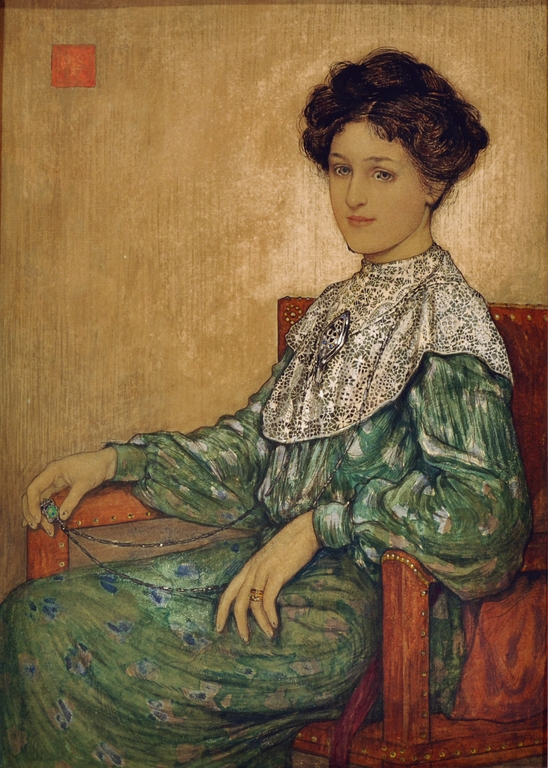
- Katharine Maltwood (1905) by Nico Jungman. Maltwood Art Museum and Gallery, Victoria BC
- Born: Katharine Emma Sapsworth; April , 1878; Woodford Green, Essex (now London)
- Died: July 29, 1961 (aged 83); Victoria, British Columbia, Canada

Katharine Emma Maltwood (née Sapsworth) was a writer and artist on the esoteric and occult. Throughout her childhood, she was reared to be an artist. Her parents were progressive, and they pushed each of their children equally to achieve their potential. In her formative years of art education, her artistic inclinations drew her into the fashionable Arts and Crafts Movement. Maltwood matriculated at the Slade School of Fine Art, University College, London (1896–97). Here, she studied sculpture.

She was fascinated by Buddhism, theosophy, Masonic rituals, Goddess Spirituality, and Egyptian culture. These topics of study were widely popular amongst the middle- and upper-class society in England during her lifetime. In addition, her extensive travel ventures made the objects of her spiritual curiosity accessible for her to learn and grasp auxiliary meanings, all of which inspired her sculpture. Her work was part of the sculpture event in the art competition at the 1924 Summer Olympics.

In 1925, Maltwood was commissioned to draw a map outlining the adventures of the Knights of King Arthur and the Holy Grail, a subject made popular in the Victorian era by the Pre-Raphaelites and Alfred, Lord Tennyson. While researching, she claimed that the effigies of the zodiac were designed in a circle on the fields of Somerset—the very fields that the tales of King Arthur had transpired upon (Maltwood; 1944, p. 3). She devoted the rest of her life to researching, writing, and publicizing what she termed “Temple of the Stars.” Her theory regarding the zodiac was a combination of Sumerian, theosophy, Masonry, Egyptosophy, Early Christianity, and Rosicrucianism.

She moved to Victoria, Canada, in 1938 with her husband because of her disillusionment with the state of Europe. She was encouraged to join the local art community by her friend Ina Uhthoff, an established figure as an artist, an art teacher, and an administrator. Maltwood contributed two pieces to the 1941 annual exhibition of the Island Arts and Crafts Society. She entered two sculptures in the exhibition: The Fire God of Mount Rainier, an Indian profile; and Aspiration, a bronze figure. She encouraged her cousin Elizabeth Duer to exhibit.

Maltwood also enjoyed sketching. Her depictions of nature were influenced by Emily Carr, from whom she purchased paintings. Maltwood continued to sketch and sculpt until she died in 1961.

Thanks to Katharine and her husband John Maltwood’s generous bequest of their estate to the University of Victoria, the Maltwood Gallery and Special Collections own a large assortment of valuable objects and information about their lives. The Maltwood Gallery and Special Collections serve different functions: the gallery conserves the art objects the Maltwoods acquired while travelling the globe, furnishing their home, pursuing their interests, and supporting fellow artists and the artistic endeavours of Mrs. Maltwood herself. Special Collections preserve the Maltwoods’ personal letters, journals, and books, including Mrs. Maltwood’s own writing.

== Major works ==
Maltwood’s first publicly recognized work was Magna Mater in 1911. It was designed as a triptych. The central individual is crouched with his arms bound together. His position resonates with despair and struggle. The man’s strong legs and arms connote that he is a labourer. On either side of the labourer, mounds of people are bound together along a rope. The quote is taken from Sirach 40 or the Ecclesiasticus, which states, “Great travail is created for every man, and a heavy yoke is upon the sons of Adam, from the day that they go out of their mother's womb, till the day that they return to the mother of all things.”

Primeval Canada Awakening to Her Destiny was originally shown by the Arts and Crafts Society in the Grosvenor Gallery in 1912 and again at the London Salon in 1913. According to the Lady’s Pictorial of July 11, 1914, the monument was intended for erection in Canada, although we have no other source to prove this statement. The title of the work confirms that Maltwood had connections within Canada early on in her career. The Maltwoods had many friends who had moved from England to Canada, and they chose to visit Victoria in particular on several occasions. In fact, they even asked Samuel McLure to design a home for them on one visit. The dynamic head is the only remaining portion of this sculpture. A photo is the only proof we have that this sculpture was once attached to a body. The grand woman in this photo has her head upturned to the sky, possibly delivering a message to God. She is clothed in forest leaves, and at her sides are figures of moose and buffalo. Between the feet of the woman stands a bearded figure, a pioneer with an axe. His arms are outstretched as if in worship of Canada rising before and above him. Maltwood saw Canada as unspoiled and bountiful, in contrast to the materially driven and spiritually decayed Britain. Maltwood felt a deep connection to the nature of British Columbia; it evoked truth, power, and mysterious strength, all of which were virtues that she aspired to represent in her art.

Font for the New Church of the Good Sheperd was made in Tadsworth, Surrey, in 1923. Circling the bowl is an inscription from Keble’s Lyra Innocentium. The three reliefs at the top surrounding the basin are the “open hand,” the “Agnus Dei,” and the holy dove descending; they symbolize the Father, the Son, and the Holy Ghost (Brown, p. 23).

Mills of God (1919) is a sculpture of a giant wheel with multiple bodies helping one another to reach the peak of the wheel. The sculpture concerns the subject of reincarnation: each time an individual reincarnates, they are closer to reaching enlightenment. The wheel is a known symbol of reincarnation. In Buddhism, it is believed that when a person reaches the state of Buddha, they no longer reincarnate unless they desire to.

The Priest of Buddha (1920) is a bust of Buddha with his hands in prayer position. The Buddha’s appearance is influenced by Art Deco, and he wears a headdress with a rather Masonic symbol on the front. Although Maltwood was not a mason at this point in her life, there is clear Masonic reference in the design.

Aspiration (1924) is a sculpture of a man reaching outward to receive enlightenment. The style of the work is art nouveau.

Mirage (1927) is of a man sitting on a camel, his image duplicated on the sand. Cardonald in the novel House of Fulfillment explains that it “reminds and reveals all the experiences of illusion,” referring to the Buddhist concept of the illusion of self, separateness, and the earthly idea of time as opposed to a true awareness of harmonious unity ” (Brown, p. 36).

Buddha's Path of Enlightenment (1929) is of a Buddha atop a high mountain. It is about the struggles of attaining enlightenment and about the ultimate bliss that comes with having achieved this state.

Trees Over Water, c. 1939 by Katharine Maltwood, Maltwood Art Museum and Gallery, Victoria BC.

The sculpture The Holy Grail (1922) was given two names by Maltwood: The Holy Grail, which it is most commonly known as, and Samadhi. The former title refers to her interest in Arthurian legends and foreshadows her discovery of the Glastonbury Zodiac. The latter title, Samadhi, is a Sanskrit word that can be defined as a state of consciousness induced by complete meditation. The idol holds a cup in his hands. The hand posture is inspired by tai chi. Tai chi movements are meant to build and release energy flow in the body and mind. The cup rests in a spiritually sensitive space, which signifies the importance of the cup. Maltwood believed that the cup “embodied the lost knowledge that man must rediscover to achieve spiritual salvation” (Brown, p. 34).

The sketch Trees over Water was created in 1939, a year after Maltwood arrived in Victoria. The branches twist and curl in the wind, reminiscent of Art Nouveau designs. Colour is used sparingly in order to highlight the rich greens of the foliage in the foreground and the sun shining on the tips of the jagged rocks, all with the intent of heightening the drama of the scene. Her views on nature were inspired by her interest in theosophy, much like members of the Group of Seven, and Eastern religions such as Buddhism. Maltwood was influenced in her work by the modern art movement termed symbolism but never ventured into abstraction.

== Authored ==
Maltwood, K. E. The Enchantments of Britain or King Arthur's Round Table of the Stars. Victoria, Victoria Printing and Publishing Co., 1944.

Maltwood, K. E. King Arthur’s Round Table of the Zodiac. Victoria, Victoria Printing and Publishing Co., 1946.

Maltwood, K. E. A Guide to Glastonbury’s Temple of the Stars: their giant effigies described from air views, maps, and from “The High History of the Holy Grail.” London, The Women’s Printing Society, Ltd., 1934.

Maltwood, K. E. Air View Supplement to A Guide to Glastonbury's Temple of the Stars. London, John M. Watkins, 1937.

Maltwood, K. E. Itinerary of "The Somerset giants" abridged from King Arthur's Round Table of the Zodiac. Victoria, Victoria Printing and Publishing Co., undated.

== See also ==
- Landscape Zodiac
- Stella Langdale
