= The Witches of Chiswick =

2003 novel by Robert Rankin

- Author: Robert Rankin
- Language: English
- Genre: Fantasy novel
- Publisher: Gollancz
- Publication date: 2003
- Publication place: United Kingdom
- Media type: Print (Hardback & Paperback)
- Pages: 336 pp (hardcover edition)
- ISBN: 0-575-07314-4 (hardcover edition)
- OCLC: 59262596
- Followed by: Knees Up Mother Earth

The Witches of Chiswick is a novel by the British author Robert Rankin, the title parodying that of The Witches of Eastwick by John Updike.

== Plot ==
Working in a dystopian 23rd century, William Starling finds a painting, The Fairy Feller's Master-Stroke by Richard Dadd from the 19th century with the image of a digital watch hidden within it. William takes a drug which confers the ability to tap into ancestral memories. After learning of events occurring in the 19th century, William and Tim are attacked by a Babbage robot sent from the past, and William escapes to the past via the robot's time machine.

Stuck in the 19th century in Victorian London, William is greeted by Hugo Rune, who explains to Will that he is his direct descendant. Will learns that 19th Century history is a lie: Charles Babbage's difference engine was a huge success, providing the growing British Empire with robots, digital watches, airships, and even the first rocket to the Moon.

After returning to London, Will and Hugo take on a case for Sherlock Holmes – to discover the identity of Jack the Ripper to learn more about the witches' cabal. Hugo becomes the Ripper's next victim. Will finds a box in Hugo's trunk containing Barry, the Sprout Guardian. Will uses Barry to return to the future to enlist the aid of Tim.

Will and Tim return to the past, meeting an invisible H. G. Wells, the Elephant Man, the Brentford Snail Boy, and another Will from an alternate future. After finding Hugo's true residence in the Buttes Estate, Will and Tim set out to save the 19th Century and the future from the influence of the Witches of Chiswick.

Hugo faked his death, not for the first time, and returns to aid Tim and Will. Will discovers that Count Otto is a Babbage robot, controlled by the Will from the alternate future. Driven mad, the alternate Will became evil and committed the Jack the Ripper killings. "Anti-Will" faces Hugo, travels back in time to prevent the Babbage Difference Engine from being recognized, then returns to the circus to finish his goal of controlling the world. When Hugo confesses that 'he' cannot stop the "anti-Will", William realises he can sacrifice himself to defeat his duplicate. Will lunges for "anti-Will" and the pair are destroyed due to the temporal paradox. History is changed, the Victorian era never develops the computer and in the future Will and Tim are born and lead normal lives.
