= Robert Rankin =

British fantasy author

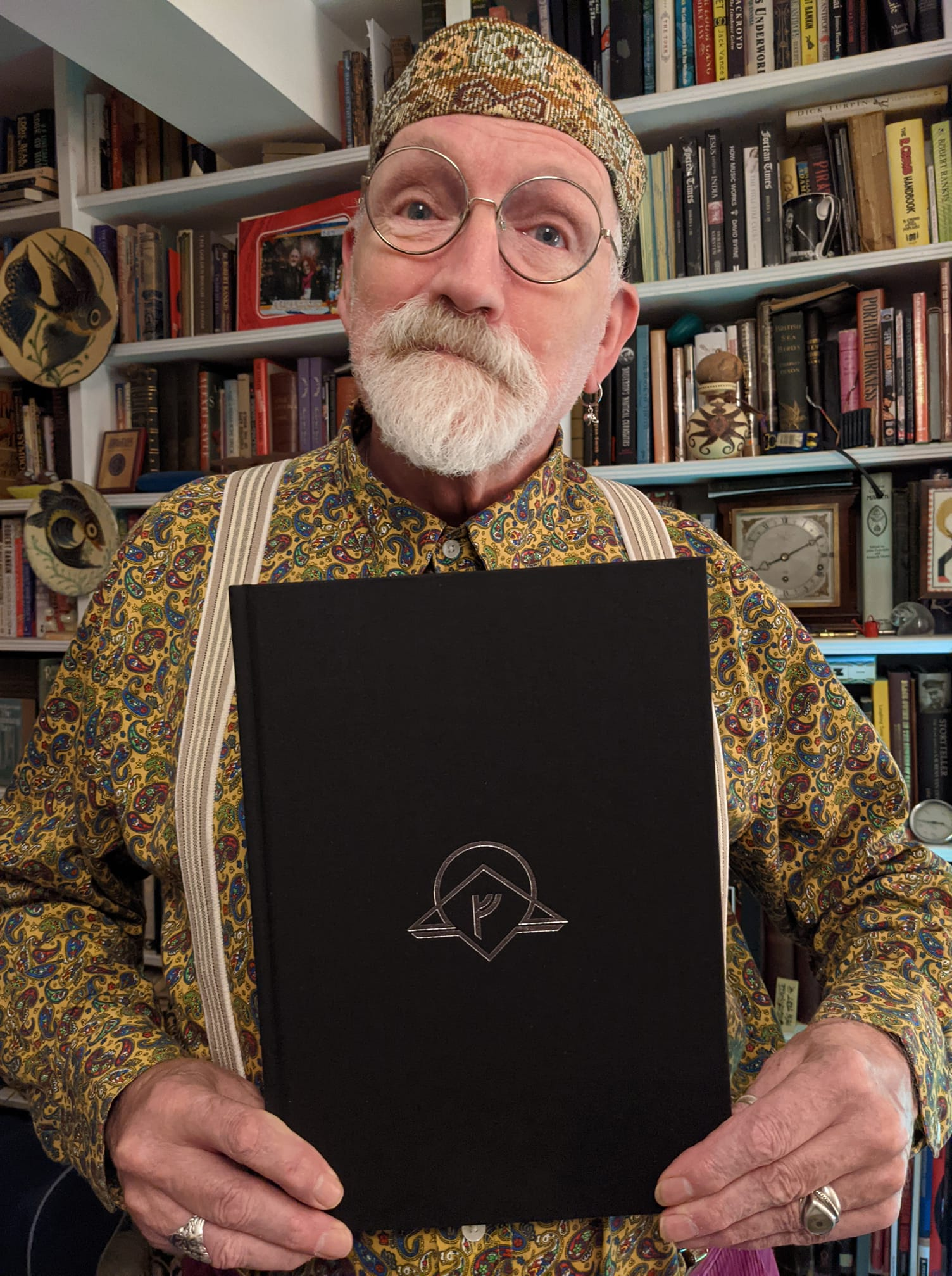
- Rankin in 2021
- Born: 27 July 1949 (age 77); Parsons Green, London, England
- Occupation: Writer
- Writing career
- Period: 1981–present
- Genre: Comedic fantasy

Robert Fleming Rankin (born 27 July 1949) is a prolific British author of comedic fantasy novels. Born in Parsons Green, London, he started writing in the late 1970s, and first entered the bestsellers lists with Snuff Fiction in 1999, by which time his previous eighteen books had sold around one million copies. His books are a mix of science fiction, fantasy, the occult, urban legends, running gags, metafiction, steampunk and outrageous characters. According to the (largely fictional) biography printed in some Corgi editions of his books, Rankin refers to his style as 'Far Fetched Fiction' in the hope that bookshops will let him have a section to himself. Many of Rankin's books are bestsellers.

Most of Rankin's books are set in Brentford, a suburb of London where the author grew up, and which, in his novels, is usually infested with alien conspiracies and ancient evil.

In addition to his novels, Rankin held a position as the Writer in Residence of Brentford's Watermans Arts Centre during the 1980s, and organised a regular poetry event there which he claims was the largest in Britain. He also has performed on stage with bands.

Rankin's fan club, The Order of the Golden Sprout (named after Rankin's fixation with the vegetable), maintain a website and arrange events, many around Brentford. In 2009 he was created the first Fellow of The Victorian Steampunk Society in recognition of his contribution to the genre. He lives in Brighton with his wife, Dr. Rachel Hayward-Rankin.

During 2012, Rankin published his first 23 novels (up to and including Fandom of the Operator) on Kindle through his own publishing enterprise, Far Fetched Books, with new cover artwork.

== Bibliography ==
=== Novels ===
- The Antipope (1981) (First book of The Brentford Trilogy)
- The Brentford Triangle (1982) (Second book of The Brentford Trilogy)
- East of Ealing (1984) (Third book of The Brentford Trilogy)
- The Sprouts of Wrath (1988) (Fourth book of The Brentford Trilogy)
- Armageddon: The Musical (1988) (Armageddon Series)
- They Came and Ate Us: Armageddon II: The B Movie (1991) (Armageddon Series)
- The Suburban Book of the Dead: Armageddon III: The Remake (1992) (Armageddon Series)
- The Book of Ultimate Truths (1993) (Cornelius Murphy Series)
- Raiders of the Lost Car Park (1994) (Cornelius Murphy Series)
- The Greatest Show Off Earth (1994)
- The Most Amazing Man Who Ever Lived (1995) (Cornelius Murphy Series)
- The Garden of Unearthly Delights (1995)
- A Dog Called Demolition (1996)
- Nostradamus Ate My Hamster (1996)
- Sprout Mask Replica (1997)
- The Brentford Chainstore Massacre (1997) (Fifth book of The Brentford Trilogy)
- The Dance of the Voodoo Handbag (1998)
- Apocalypso (1998)
- Snuff Fiction (1999)
- Sex and Drugs and Sausage Rolls (1999) (Sixth book of The Brentford Trilogy)
- Waiting for Godalming (2000)
- Web Site Story (2001)
- Fandom of the Operator (2001)
- The Hollow Chocolate Bunnies of the Apocalypse (2002)
- The Witches of Chiswick (2003)
- Knees Up Mother Earth (2004) (Seventh book of The Brentford Trilogy)
- The Brightonomicon (2005) (Eighth book of The Brentford Trilogy)
- The Toyminator (2006)
- The Da-da-de-da-da Code (2007)
- Necrophenia (2008)
- Retromancer (2009) (Ninth book of The Brentford Trilogy)
- The Japanese Devil Fish Girl and Other Unnatural Attractions (2010)
- The Mechanical Messiah and Other Marvels of the Modern Age (2011)
- The Educated Ape and Other Wonders of the Worlds (2012)
- The Chickens of Atlantis and Other Foul and Filthy Fiends (2013)
- The Abominable Showman (2015)
- I, Robert (2015)
- The Lord of the Ring Roads (2017) (The Final Brentford Trilogy Book 1)
- The Chronicles of Banarnia (2019) (The Final Brentford Trilogy Book 2)
- Normanghast (2023) (The Final Brentford Trilogy Book 3)
- The Priestess of Penge

=== Short fiction ===
- "The Boscombe Walters Story" (1996)

=== Illustrated works ===
- The Bumper Book of Ficts by Neil Gardner, illustrated by Robert Rankin (2010)
- Empires, writer-illustrator (2011)
- Alice on Mars, writer-illustrator (2013)
- The Divine Commodore, written and illustrated by Robert Rankin (2014)
- ’’The Book With No Words’’ ‘written’ and illustrated by Robert Rankin (2021)

== Awards ==
- British Fantasy Society Best Novel nominee (1997) for The Brentford Chainstore Massacre
- SFX Best Novel Award Winner (2003) for The Hollow Chocolate Bunnies of the Apocalypse
- British Fantasy Society Best Novel nominee (2006) for The Brightonomicon
- Coventry Inspiration Book Awards (2007) Lost Worlds: for The Hollow Chocolate Bunnies of the Apocalypse
- The Hub Best Comedy (Audio) Award for "The Brightonomicon - Audio Series"
- Fellow of The Victorian Steampunk Society (2009)

== Other media ==
In 2008, The Brightonomicon was adapted into a 13-part full-cast audio drama by Hokus Bloke Productions and BBC Audiobooks starring David Warner, Andy Serkis, Jason Isaacs, Ben Miller, Rupert Degas, Mark Wing-Davey, Martin Jarvis and Sarah Douglas. Initially released as a 7-CD boxset and as a digital download, the series has now been re-edited for radio transmission, and Robert's first ever radio series aired on BBC7 (now known as Radio 4 Extra) from 23 August to 15 November 2008. Rankin has also had his novel The Antipope dramatised for audio, and has also read unabridged versions of many of his novels as audiobooks. He recorded eleven of his titles for Audible. His free, full colour webcomic called Robert Rankin's Empires for Beyond Reality Media in New Zealand, can be viewed online, and illustrated work Alice on Mars will also be released via the same website.

- The Brightonomicon - audio drama and radio series (BBC7)
- The Antipope - audio drama and audiobook
- The Hollow Chocolate Bunnies of the Apocalypse - audiobook
- The Toyminator - audiobook
- The Fandom of the Operator - audiobook
- Nostradamus Ate My Hamster - audiobook

== Art and illustration ==
Rankin studied at Ealing School of Art, where he was a contemporary of Freddie Mercury and Alan Lee. He worked for Playboy magazine and illustrated a book about The Beatles before his portfolio was stolen and he abandoned the idea of working as a professional illustrator. However he created many of the sculptures which feature on his book covers, many of which were on display at The Collection, a gallery in Lincoln during September 2010. Some of these works were previously exhibited in Waterstones, Brighton, and at Gunnersbury Park Museum in 2007-8. In 2009 Rankin was commissioned by his publisher to provide a series of new illustrations for his back catalogue of books (from The Hollow Chocolate Bunnies of the Apocalypse to the present), he also created new internal illustrations for The Brightonomicon, Retromancer and The Japanese Devil Fish Girl and Other Unnatural Attractions. A cartoon by Rankin "The Robot and the Elongated Author" was published in Issue 13 of Murky Depths, and 2010 also saw the publication of his first illustrated book, written by Neil Gardner, The Bumper Book of Ficts, which was launched on 18 September 2010 in Brentford. A limited hard-back edition of Empires was launched in the UK mid-2012 which is now sold out. In July 2013 Rankin's own publishing house Far-Fetched Books launched Alice on Mars, in a limited edition of 3000; this book is being made into a full-length feature film by award-winning independent film-maker Martin Gooch. July 2014 saw the release of his next illustrated book, The Divine Commodore, also published by Far-Fetched Books in a limitied run of 3000. He has recently completed writing his memoirs which were published in the autumn of 2015 under the title I,Robert.
