= University of Victoria Legacy Art Galleries =

University art museum in British Columbia, Canada

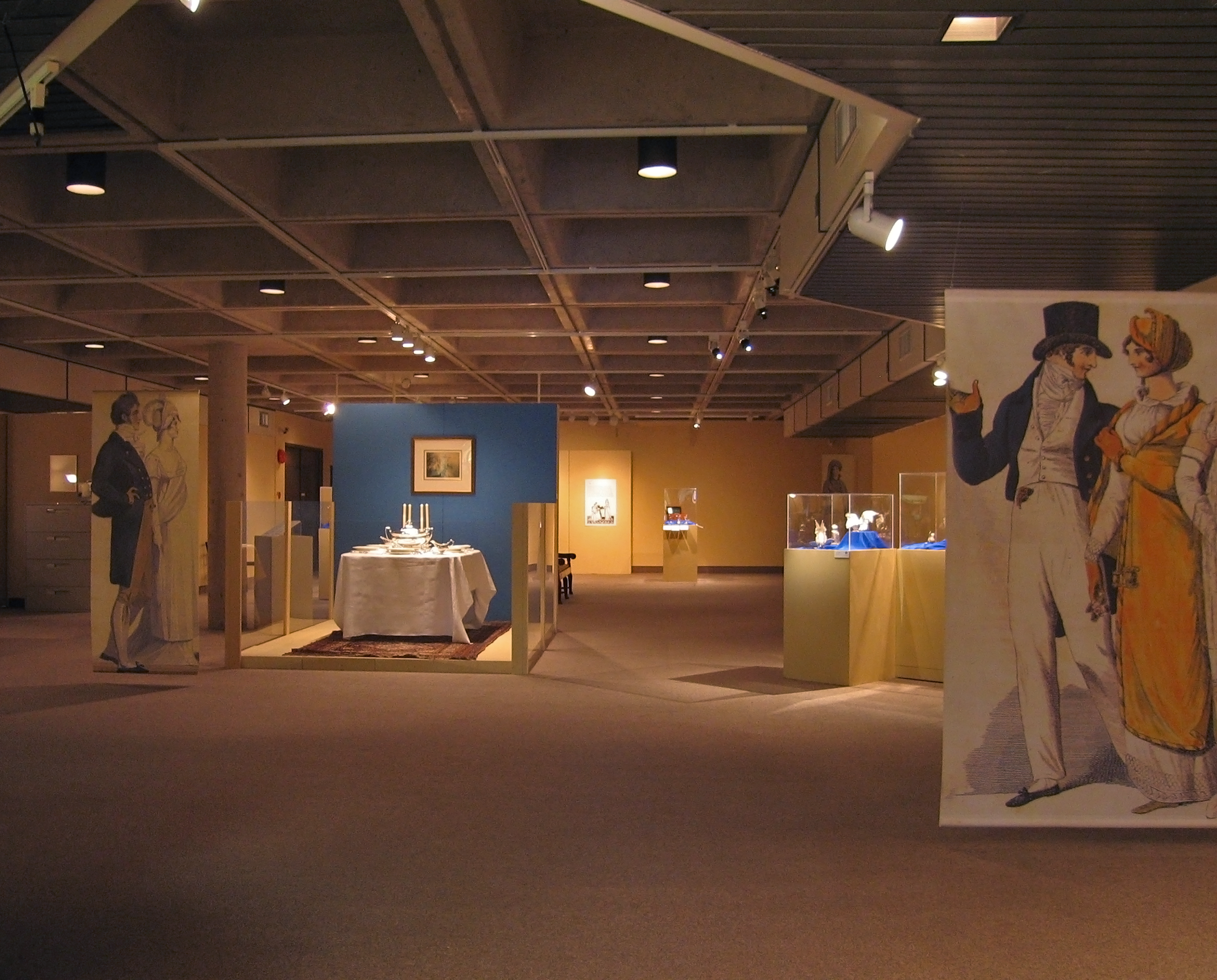
- Former name: Maltwood Art Gallery and Museum
- Established: 1964 (collection established 1953 but with no permanent museum facility)
- Location: 630 Yates Street; Victoria, British Columbia; V8W 1K9
- Coordinates: 48°25′36″N 123°21′58″W
- Type: Art galleries
- Collections: Indigenous art, art from the Pacific Northwest, contemporary art
- Director: Mary Jo Hughes
- Website: www.uvic.ca/legacygalleries

The University of Victoria Legacy Art Galleries (Legacy) is the university's art museum in Victoria, British Columbia, Canada, responsible for the accessibility and stewardship of an art collection which consists of approximately 18,000 objects including Canadian, Indigenous and international historic and contemporary art. Legacy activates the collection for research, teaching and learning for students, faculty and the general public through exhibitions, campus displays, publications, web-projects, public programs, and events—on site and through digital resources.

Legacy has three main sites for rotating exhibitions including the Legacy Art Gallery at 630 Yates Street in Downtown Victoria, on campus at the Legacy Maltwood in the Mearns Centre for Learning - McPherson Library, and in the First Peoples House. Additionally, more than 2,000 works from the collection are on display in buildings across campus and in the community, underlining the educational and community-building roles of art. The Legacy Downtown is also a site for public programs, and both university and community events.

== History ==
The "University of Victoria Art Collection" was established in 1953 with the purpose of furnishing buildings around campus with art. The "Maltwood Art Gallery and Museum" was established in 1964 with a bequest from John and Katharine Maltwood that included their art collection and mansion, nicknamed the Thatch. From this gift, the University of Victoria created a public art museum in the Thatch. The Maltwoods' original donation ranged from Chinese ceramics to textiles, rugs, seventeenth century English furniture, Canadian painting, and Katharine Maltwood's own sculptural works, paintings, and drawings.

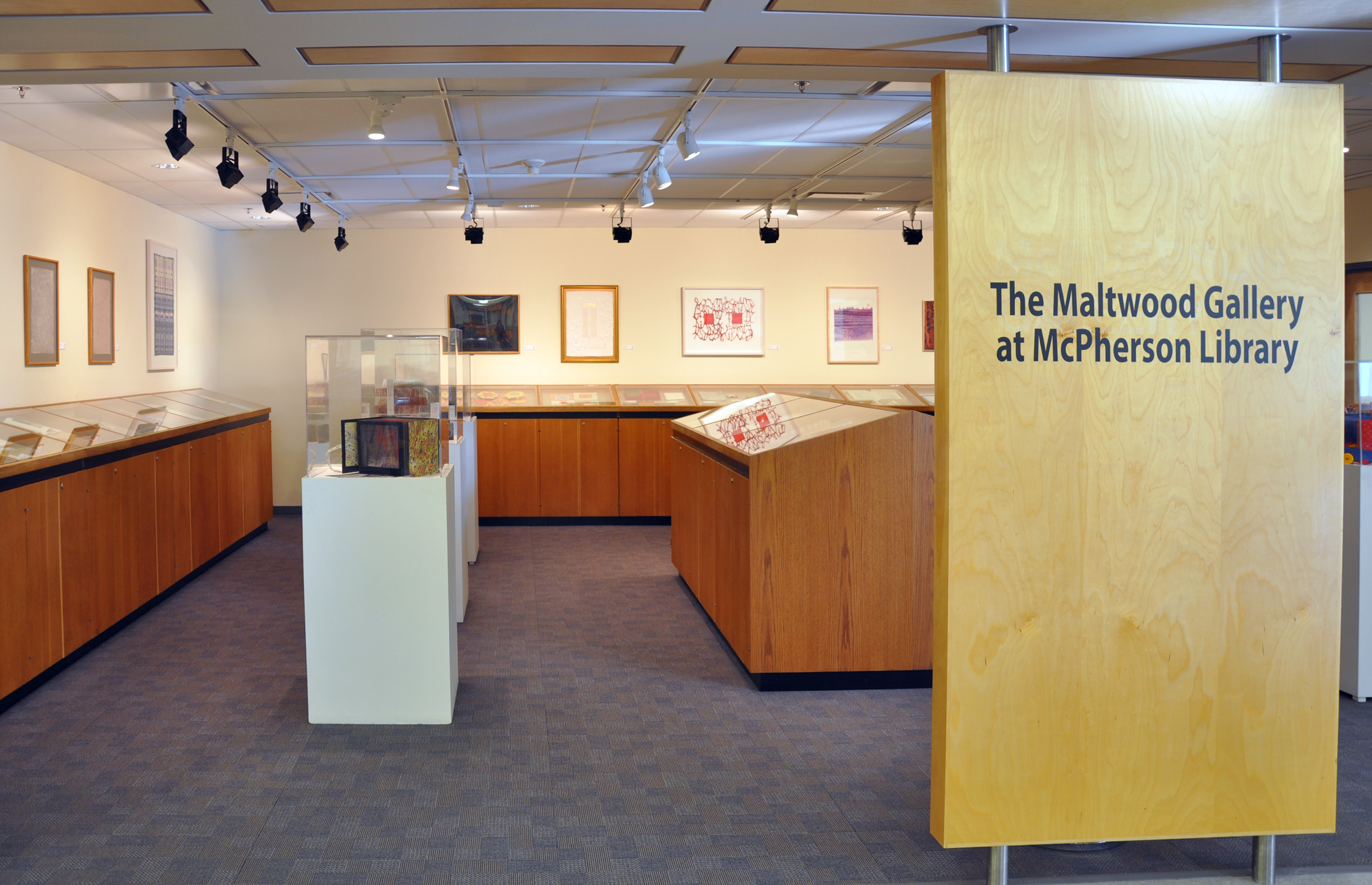
The Art of the Book '08 Exhibit, 2010–2011, Victoria, British Columbia

The University of Victoria Art Collection and the Maltwood Art Gallery and Museum were amalgamated in 1978. At this time, a dedicated space for the collection was opened in the Jamie Cassels Centre (formerly University Centre) .

In 2000, the gallery received a bequest from Michael C. Williams which included the donation of his extensive art collection and several downtown properties. "University of Victoria Legacy Art Galleries" (sometimes shortened to the "Legacy") was created as an umbrella name. This umbrella term includes the "Maltwood Art Gallery and Museum", which continued to exist on campus, and the "Legacy Art Gallery and Café", which was created in one of the downtown buildings donated by Michael Williams. The adoption of the umbrella term pays homage and recognizes the many donors that have contributed to the collection.

In 2011 the Maltwood Art Gallery and Museum moved from its location in the Jamie Cassels Centre to the lower level of the McPherson Library and was renamed the "Maltwood Gallery". The Legacy Café and Art Gallery has also been renamed as "Legacy Downtown". Currently, the main exhibition spaces for the Legacy are the Legacy Downtown (located at the intersection of Yates and Broad streets), the Maltwood Gallery (on campus), and First Peoples House (on campus).

== Collections history ==
The Legacy acquires most of the works in its collection through donations from benefactors. The two largest benefactors to the University of Victoria Art Collections are John & Katharine Maltwood and Michael C. Williams.

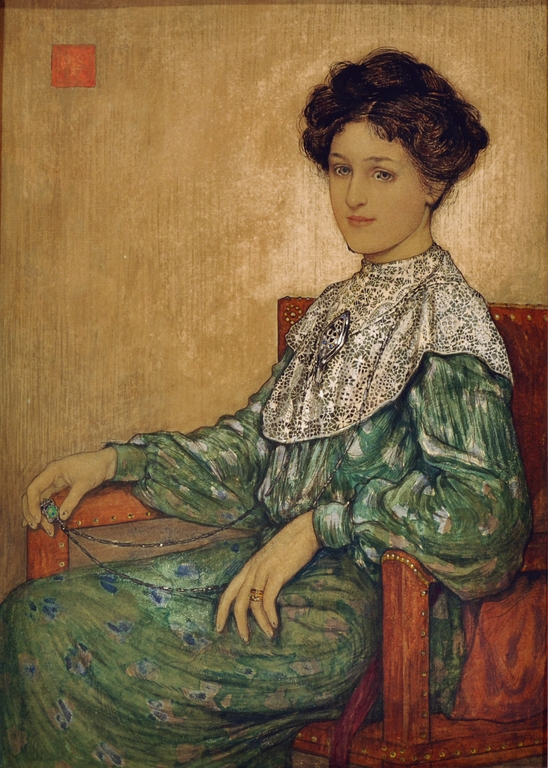
Katherine Maltwood, by Nico Jungman, 1905, Maltwood Art Museum and Gallery, Victoria, British Columbia

=== The Maltwood Collection ===
The Maltwood Collection is a subcategory of works owned by the University of Victoria Art Collections. The original Maltwood collection was owned by John and Katharine Maltwood, global travellers who accumulated various items relating to their spiritual interests. These pieces were displayed in their Victoria home, alongside Katharine's own works. The collection adheres to the couple's ideology of having nothing in their home that was not useful or beautiful. Upon moving to Victoria, the Maltwoods decided to develop a museum to house their art, with the aim of one day donating it to the city. They purchased a former restaurant in the Royal Oak area of Victoria, British Columbia. Serving as a gallery and home, it was called The Thatch. The couple's collection consisted of household items from various artistic periods, such as English Gothic furniture, furniture from the Tudor and Stuart periods, Oriental and Persian antique rugs and Oriental silk hanging scrolls, paintings from Paris, London, and Peiping, modern oil and watercolour paintings, Chinese and Middle Eastern ceramics and figurines, and Moslem pottery and metalwork, in addition to Katharine Maltwood’s own works, writings, and journals. A library of art books referencing the Maltwoods' holdings accompanied the collection.

The Maltwood Collection was generously donated to the University of Victoria Art Collections in 1964. It resided at The Thatch until 1977 when it moved to its current location in the University Centre at the University of Victoria. The Maltwood Art Museum and Gallery currently conserves the art objects from the donation, while the University of Victoria’s Special Collections conserves the Maltwoods’ personal letters, journals, and books, including Katharine's writing.

=== The Michael C. Williams Collection ===
Upon his passing in 2000, Michael Collard Williams bequeathed most of his estate to the University of Victoria. Valued at $17 million, the donation marks the University of Victoria’s largest gift to date. The Williams Collection is made up of over 1100 art objects such as drawings, paintings, and sculptures that include contemporary and historical West Coast art, Aboriginal art, and antique works.

Michael C. Williams moved to British Columbia in 1950, eventually settling in Victoria in 1958. In 1977, his attention was drawn to the city’s heritage, resulting in many building restoration projects in the downtown area. His first urban renewal was the Maynard Court area on Johnson Street, followed by the 1890s era Grand Central Hotel and Victoria Box and Paper Complex, for which he was given the North American Award of Merit from New York’s Downtown Research and Development Centre. The Swans Hotel and Brew Pub is perhaps one of his better-known restorations, a beautiful street-side hotel that once served as a seed and fertilizer warehouse.

The University of Victoria received many of these properties through the Williams bequest. The Legacy Art Gallery and Café, located at 630 Yates St. in Victoria, was just one of these properties. The Legacy Gallery is a monument to Williams’s life and generosity, hosting rotating exhibits that draw from his collection and other University of Victoria Art Collections holdings. The Legacy Gallery also exhibits local and Canadian artists. The Swans Hotel and Brew Pub is another property owned by the University of Victoria. The "Art Hotel" was opened in 1987 as Williams's own exhibition space. The hotel still displays many works from the Williams collection year round in its many suites and public areas.

== Exhibits ==
Since 1964, the Legacy has presented over 500 exhibitions in a number of gallery spaces. The exhibitions have drawn on the John and Katherine Maltwood Collection, the Michael C. Williams Collection, external collections, travelling exhibitions, faculty and student research projects, and the works of local and international artists. The Legacy's current exhibition mandate focuses on exhibitions that focus on "issues that matter" including those that highlight diversity and reconciliation.

== Former names and gallery locations ==
The University of Victoria Art Collection was established in 1953 with the purpose of furnishing buildings around campus with art. It was amalgamated into The Maltwood Art Gallery and Museum in 1964 with a bequest from Katharine and John Maltwood of their art collection and mansion. The mansion was sold to create a dedicated gallery space on campus which opened in the University Centre in 1978. In 2000, the gallery received a bequest from Michael Williams which included the donation of his extensive art collection and several downtown properties. University of Victoria Legacy Art Galleries (sometimes shorted to the Legacy) was created as an umbrella name. This umbrella term includes the Maltwood Art Gallery and Museum, which continued to exist on campus, and the Legacy Art Gallery and Café, which was created in one of the downtown buildings donated by Michael Williams. The adoption of the umbrella term pays homage and recognizes the many donors that have contributed to the collection. In 2011 the Maltwood Art Gallery and Museum moved from its location in the University Centre to the lower level of the McPherson Library and was renamed the Maltwood Gallery. The Legacy Café and Art Gallery has also been renamed as Legacy Downtown. Currently, the main exhibition spaces for the Legacy are the Legacy Downtown (located at the intersection of Yates and Broad streets), the Maltwood Gallery (on campus), and First People's House (on campus).

== See also ==
- List of art museums
- List of museums in British Columbia
