= Stella Langdale =

British-Canadian artist

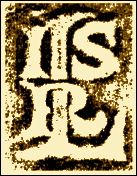
- Stella Langdale's artist stamp, as found in a book owned by her uncle, Marmaduke Robert Langdale
- Born: Irene Stella Rolph Langdale; 1880; Staines-upon-Thames, England
- Died: April 14, 1976 (aged 95–96); Santa Barbara, California, USA
- Other name: Irene Stella Rolph Langdale
- Occupations: Artist and Illustrator
- Notable work: Christ in Hades (1917) by Stephen Phillips The Dream of Gerontius (1916) by John Henry Cardinal Newman Symphonie Symbolique (1919) by Edmund John The Hound of Heaven (1922) by Francis Thompson
- Style: Art Nouveau and Symbolism

Irene Stella Rolph Langdale (1880 – April 14, 1976) was an English and Canadian artist. She was commonly referred to as Stella Langdale.

She sketched worked in charcoal but also used oils, watercolour, pastels and etching techniques especially aquatint in her work. She also produced sculptures. Her preferred subject matter was landscapes from North Africa, Italy and France, as well as imaginary images often with musical inspiration. She exhibited at the major British galleries including the Royal Scottish Academy, the Royal Glasgow Institute of the Fine Arts, and the Paris Salon. She was also a member of such organizations as the Senefelder Club, the International Society of Sculptors, Painters and Gravers, and she was a founding member of The Print Society.

== Early life ==
Stella Langdale was born in Staines-upon-Thames, Middlesex. The daughter of Marmaduke Albert Langdale and Emma Jane Rolf, she was the youngest of their four children. Born Irene Stella Rolph Langdale, Langdale seems to have rarely if ever used her full name, with the exception of her artist's signature or stamp.

Langdale's father, Marmaduke Albert Langdale, was painter who regularly exhibited at the Royal Academy, Her father regularly painted landscapes featuring the Thames. Her mother was Thomas J. Rolf of Brandon in Suffolk.

== Education ==
Langdale began her art education at the Brighton School of Art and then pursued further studies at the Glasgow School of Art where she studied from 1907 to 1910 under the new director of the school, Francis Henry Newbery. She would attend the Glasgow School of Art fo 1907 to 1910. At the Glasgow School of Art, Langdale was trained in the distinctive multidisciplinary Glasgow School of Art Style. As a student of Glasgow School of Art Style, Langdale was trained in a wide variety of mediums including watercolor painting, oil paints, charcoal and oil pastels, etching, and sculpture. The Glasgow School of Art also provided Langdale with a formal education in anatomy, composition, design, construction, and both painting and drawing technique. After school, Langdale would go on to specialize in charcoal, lithography, and oil painting.

The Glasgow School of Art Style was an amalgamation of several different artistic styles from different corners of the globe that were popular at the time that Langdale was a student: Orientalism, Realistic Impressionism, and Scottish Romanticism. These phantasmic styles and their emphasis on myth from marginalized cultures would evolve into defining characteristics of Langdale's work. Langdale would go on research and write extensively about Celtic and other global mythologies.

== Career ==
As Langdale's style developed, her work began to align most strongly with the Symbolist Movement. She sketched using charcoal and used oils, watercolour, pastels and etching techniques especially aquatint in her work. She also produced sculptures.

Inspired by mythology and music, Langdale blended these elements to create an etherial tone, which she combined with the contemporary Art Nouveau style to create her signature styles. Her preferred subject matters were landscapes from North Africa, Italy and France, as well as imaginary images often with musical inspiration. Captivated by the still-standing edifices to ancient religions, Langdale spent a large part of her professional life traveling between England, Greece, North Africa, and Italy, seeking inspiration in these landscapes and cultures.

Christ in Hades by Stephen Phillips, illustrated by Stella Langdale

She exhibited at the major British galleries and the Paris Salon. She also exhibited with the Royal Scottish Academy, the Royal Glasgow Institute of the Fine Arts, the Senefelder Club and the International Society of Sculptors, Painters and Gravers.

She worked as a book illustrator for almost 25 years with publishers John Lane and Dodd, Mead & Co. Works that she illustrated include:

- Symphonie Symbolique (1919) by Edmund John
- The Dream of Gerontius (1916) by John Henry Newman
- Christ in Hades (1917) by Stephen Phillips
- The Hound of Heaven (1922) by Francis Thompson

Langdale came to Victoria in 1940. In 1946, she held an exhibit of works from British Columbia and a few from Europe at the Little Centre in Victoria, a precursor to the Art Gallery of Greater Victoria. She suffered from arthritis and moved to Santa Barbara, California around 1950.

Langdale died in Santa Barbara at the age of 95.
