= Temple of the Stars =

Alleged ancient temple in Somerset, England

The Temple of the Stars is an alleged ancient temple claimed to be situated around Glastonbury in Somerset, England.

== Origin ==
The temple is claimed by some to depict a colossal landscape zodiac, a map of the stars on a gigantic scale, formed by features in the landscape (roads, streams, field boundaries, etc.). The theory was first put forward in 1934 by Katherine Maltwood, an artist who "discovered" the zodiac in a vision, and held that the "temple" was created by Sumerians in about 2700 BC. The idea was revived in 1969 by Mary Caine in an article in the magazine Gandalf's Garden (number 4). Compared to Maltwood's version, she turned Scorpio upside down, added a monk to Gemini, and altered the outlines of Capricorn, Libra, and Leo.

The temple plays an important role in many occult theories. It has been associated with the Grail legend, Uther Pendragon, and King Arthur (according to some legends buried in Glastonbury).

== Criticisms ==
The idea was examined by two independent studies, one by Ian Burrow in 1975 and the other in 1983 by Tom Williamson and Liz Bellamy, using the standard methods of landscape historical research. Both studies concluded that the evidence contradicted the idea. The eye of Capricorn identified by Maltwood was a haystack. The western wing of the Aquarius phoenix was a road laid in 1782 to run around Glastonbury, and older maps dating back to the 1620s show the road had no predecessors. The Cancer boat (not a crab as would be expected) is made up of a network of eighteenth century drainage ditches and paths. There are some Neolithic paths preserved in the peat of the bog formerly comprising most of the area, but none of the known paths match the lines of the zodiac features.

Glastonbury historian Geoffrey Ashe commented, "The phenomenon is akin to the Rorschach ink-blot test, or to seeing pictures in a fire", and "Zodiac-finders do not themselves agree on these 'obvious figures'. I have studied these photographs; I know what I am meant to see; I honestly try to see, and I simply do not."

There is no support for this theory, or for the existence of the "temple" in any form, from conventional archaeologists or mainstream historians.
