= Mpangazitha (Pakalita) =

Hlubi prince

Regent king of AmaHlubi nation
- Reign: 1819-1825
- Born: 1780s KwaMagoloza Newcastle
- Died: 1825; Caledon river, Free State
- Issue: Sidinane,Mehlomakhulu,Mkatshane, Mdletye and Siphambo

Mpangazitha born Hlubi prince, later grew to first being the commander in Chief of AmaHlubi military then later Regent king of AmaHlubi nation. He was the oldest son of King Bhungane II, but he was not the crown prince. The proclaimed heir was one of his brothers King Mthimkhulu II. Mpagazitha rose to prominence when he left his father's kraal (King Bhungane II) kwaMagoloza near Newcastle with a large following of Hlubi people to establish himself elsewhere, as he was not going to be King Bhungane II's successor. However, Mpangazitha returned to lead AmaHlubi as a Regent king upon the death of his brother King Mthimkhulu II in 1819 and he reigned from then until his death in 1826. Like most Hlubi Kings and chiefs, he was also known to being an expect in rainmaking medicine. His enemy and rival was King Matiwane of the AmaNgwane Clan.

He got the name Pakalitha as a Sesotho version of Mpangazitha when he exiled in Basutoland (present-day Lesotho) for 2 years. He later led his people back to their ancestral land in what is now modern-day KwaZulu-Natal, of which he encountered King Matiwane's army and died in that battle. He had begot sons which were vital to the Clan's survival, Inkosi Sidinane (Great House) and Inkosi Mehlomakhulu (Right Hand House) which established AmaHlubi communities in unoccupied land at the north and east of now modern called Eastern Cape province. His other sons include Inkosi Mdletye, Mkatshane and Inkosi Siphambo.

Titles of nobility
Preceded by King Mthimkhulu II	King of AmaHlubi; 1819–1826	Succeeded by Prince Mahwanqa (as regent) for, King Dlomo III and later King Langalibalele I
