= Nguni peoples =

Southern African Bantu cultural group

Nguni people
AbeNguni

Languages
- Nguni languages (IsiXhosa, IsiZulu, Siswati, Ndebele); Afrikaans, English

Religion
- Christianity and (uThixo or Qamata); Unkulunkulu

Related ethnic groups
- Sotho-Tswana peoples, Tsonga people, Khoisan, San people and Ngoni people

The Nguni peoples are an ethnolinguistic group of Bantu ethnic groups native to Southern Africa where they form the single largest ethnolinguistic community.

Predecessors of the Nguni peoples migrated from Central Africa into Southern Africa during the late Iron Age, with offshoots in neighboring colonially-created countries in Southern Africa. Swazi (or Swati) people live in both South Africa and Eswatini, while Ndebele people live in both South Africa and Zimbabwe.

The Xhosa, local to the Eastern Cape, established tribal sub-federations—the Gcaleka, Rharhabe, and Gqunukhwebe—in the 16th century. The homeland of the Xhosa people is marked by lands in the Eastern Cape from the Great Kei up to Umzimkhulu near Natal, bordered by the frontier of an expanding Dutch Cape Colony.

Both the Matabele of Western Zimbabwe and the Ngoni migrated northward out of South Africa in the early 19th century, during a politically tumultuous era that included the Mfecane and Great Trek.

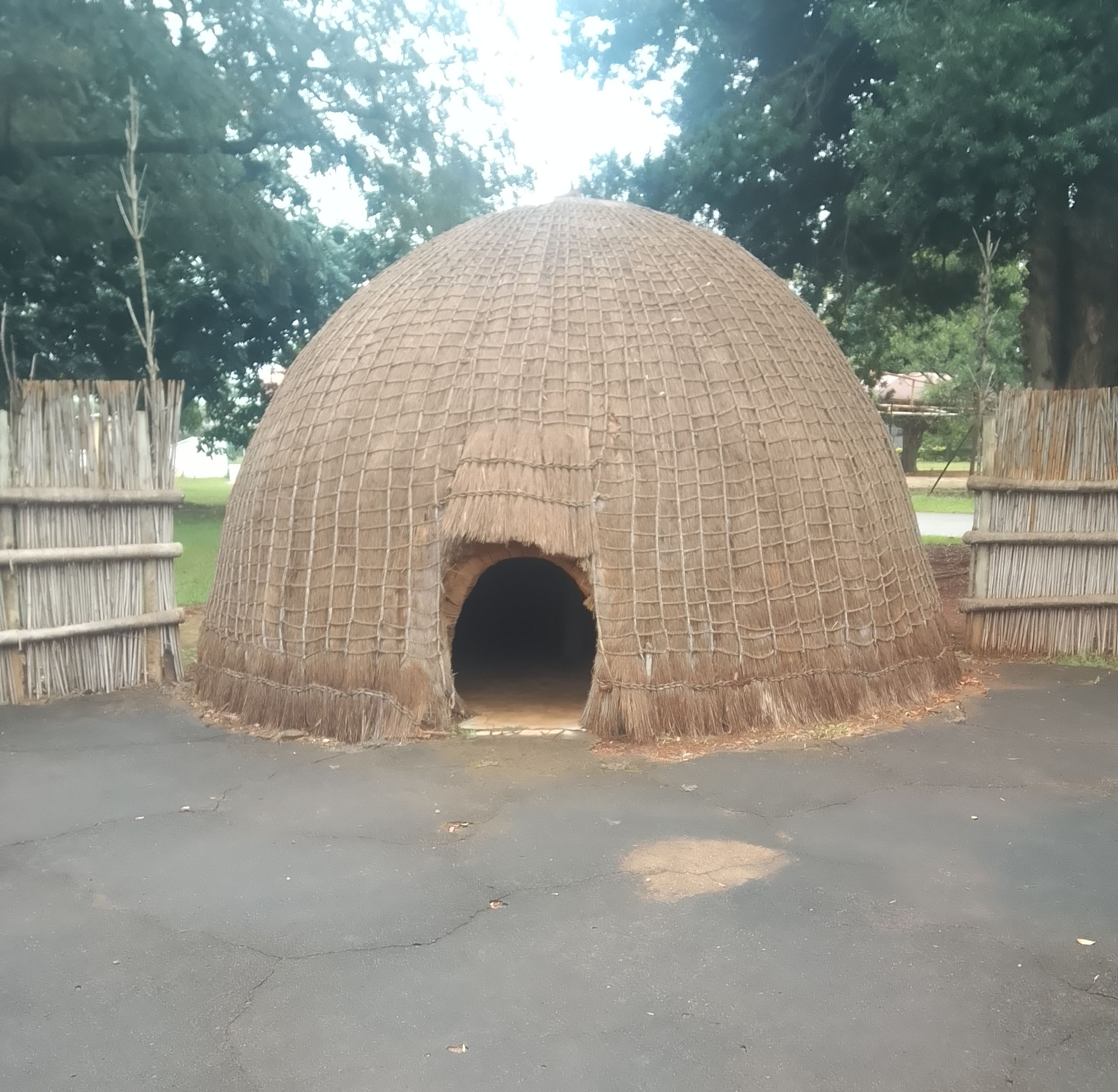
A Swazi traditional house displayed at the Eswatini National Museum, 2026

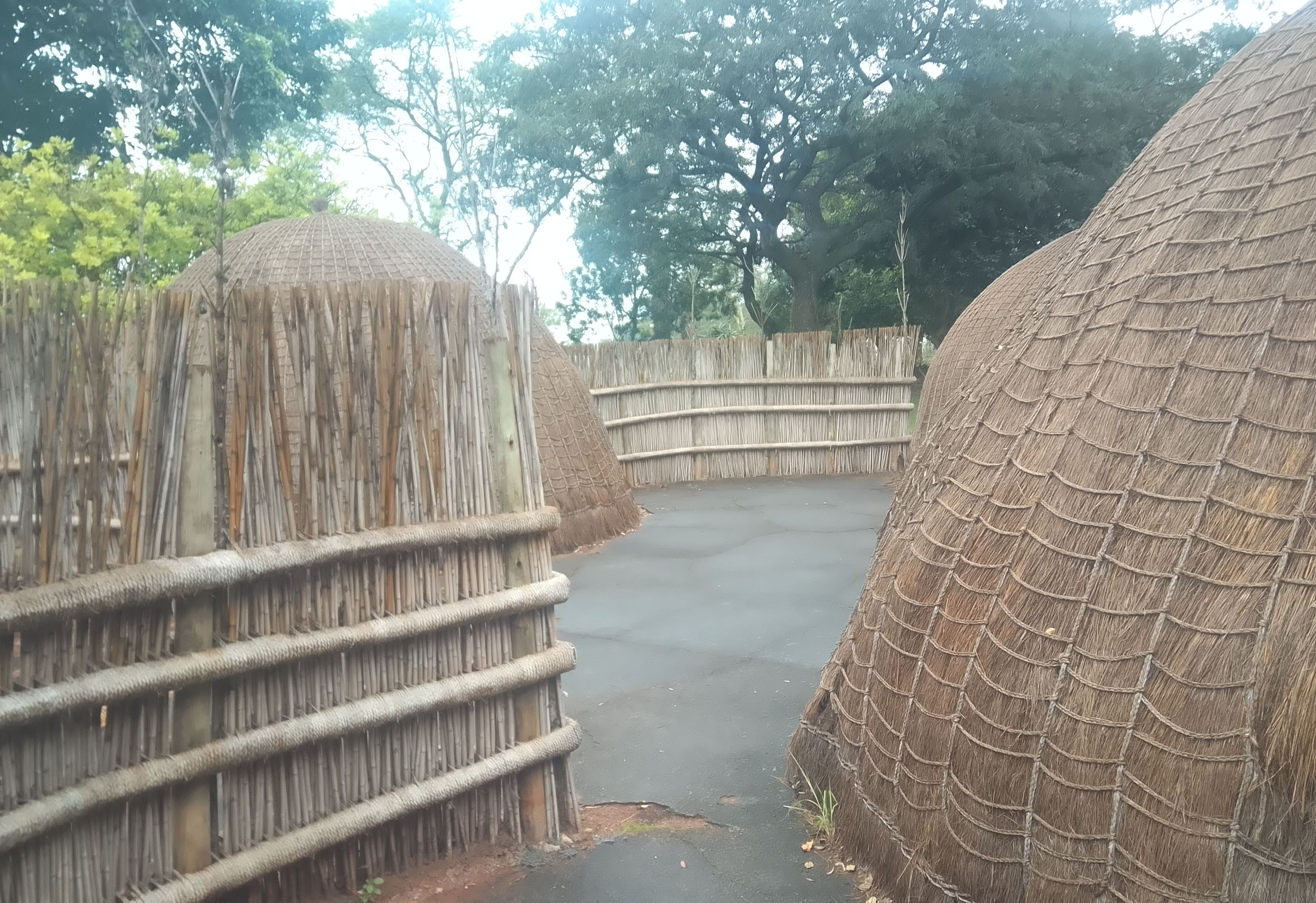

In South Africa, the regions historically comprising the territories of the Ndebele, Swazi, Xhosa, and Zulu Kingdoms are located in the latter-day provinces of the Eastern Cape, Gauteng, KwaZulu-Natal, Limpopo and Mpumalanga. The most notable of these kingdoms are the Zulu Empire founded by Shaka, a warrior-king whose conquest took place in the early nineteenth century, and the Xhosa Kingdom, infamous for its fierce opposition to colonization in the Frontier Wars.

Overall, the Nguni cultural group is made up of the abaMbo, AmaLala (Mthethwa Paramountcy), AmaNtungwa (Zulu), AmaHlubi (Radebe), Xhosa, AmaThonga (Ndwandwe), Ngoni, Swati and Ndebele ethnic groups.

In Zimbabwe, the Ndebele people live primarily in the province of Matabeleland.

== History ==
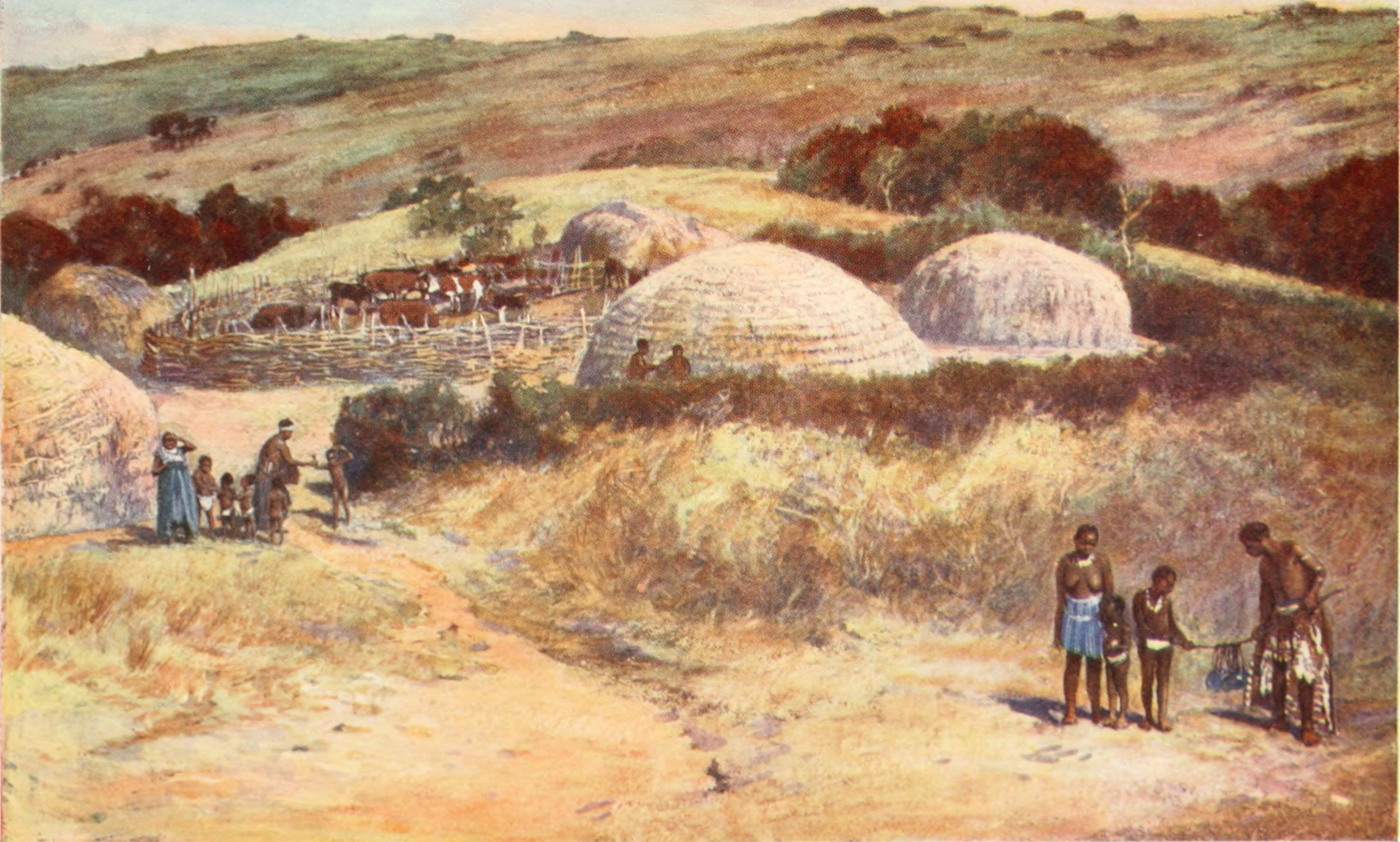
A traditional Nguni homestead from a Xhosa village in South Africa, c. 1900

Most of what is believed about ancient Nguni history comes from oral history and legends. Traditionally, their partial ancestors are said to have migrated to Africa's Great Lakes region from the north. According to linguistic evidence and historians (including John H. Robertson, Rebecca Bradley, T. Russell, Fabio Silva, and James Steele), some of the ancestors of the Nguni peoples migrated from west of the geographic centre of Africa towards modern-day South Africa 7000 years ago (5000 BCE).

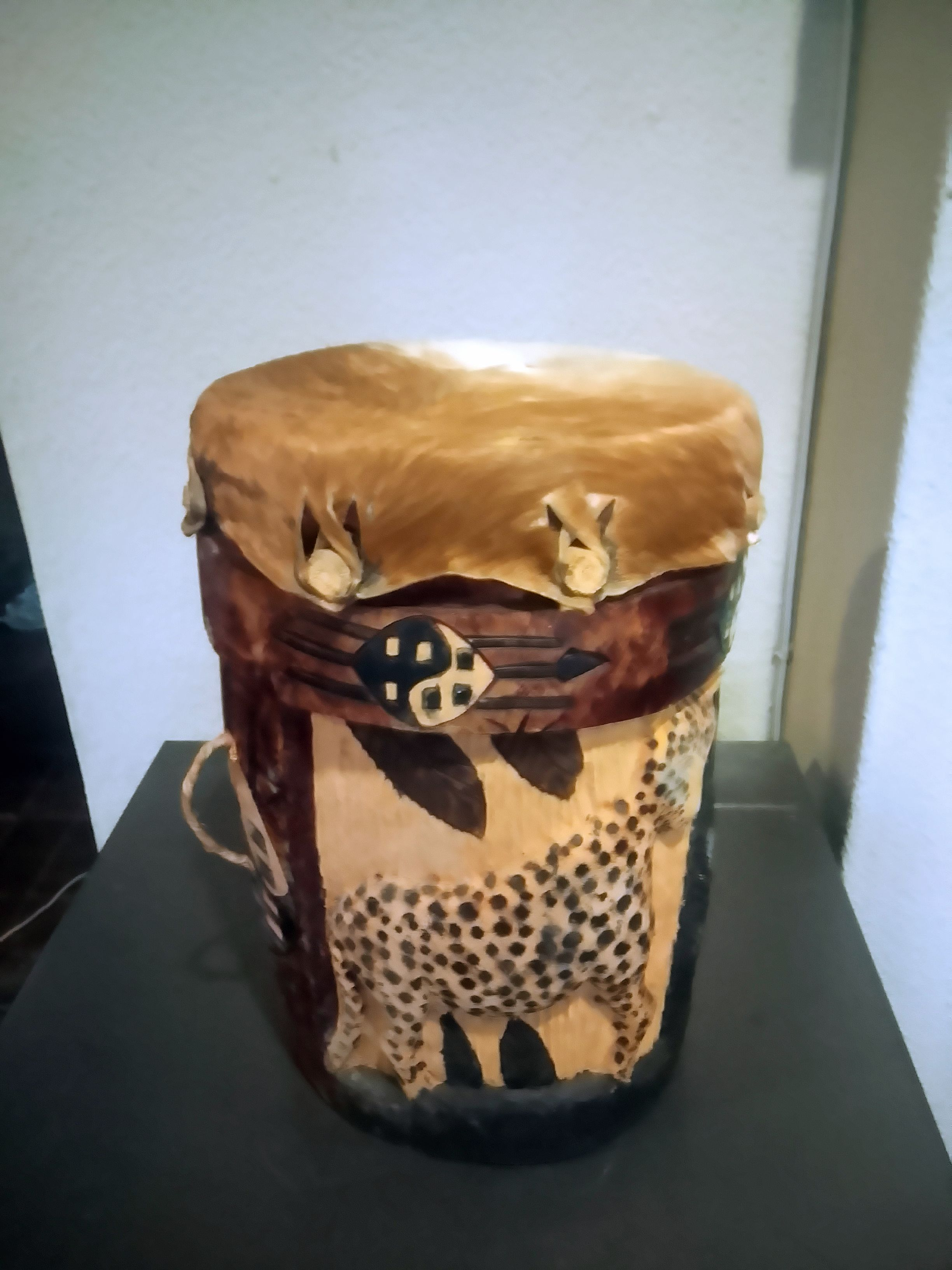
A Nguni drum displayed at the Eswatini National Museum in Lobamba

Nguni ancestors had migrated within South Africa to present-day KwaZulu-Natal by the 1st century CE and were also present in the Transvaal region at the same time. These partially nomadic ancestors of the modern Nguni peoples brought with them sheep, cattle, goats, and horticultural crops, many of which had never been used in South Africa at that time.

Other provinces in present-day South Africa, such as the Cape, saw the emergence of Nguni speakers around the same time. Some groups split off and settled along the way, while others kept going. Thus, the following settlement pattern formed: the southern Ndebele in the north, the Swazi in the northeast, the Xhosa in the south, and the Zulu towards the east. Because these peoples had a common origin, their languages and cultures show marked similarities. Partial ancestors of the Nguni eventually met and merged with San hunters, which accounts for the use of click consonants in the languages of the Nguni.

Many tribes and clans in KwaZulu-Natal are said to have been forcibly united under Shaka Zulu. Shaka Zulu's political organization was efficient in integrating conquered tribes, partly through the age regiments, where men from different villages bonded with each other.

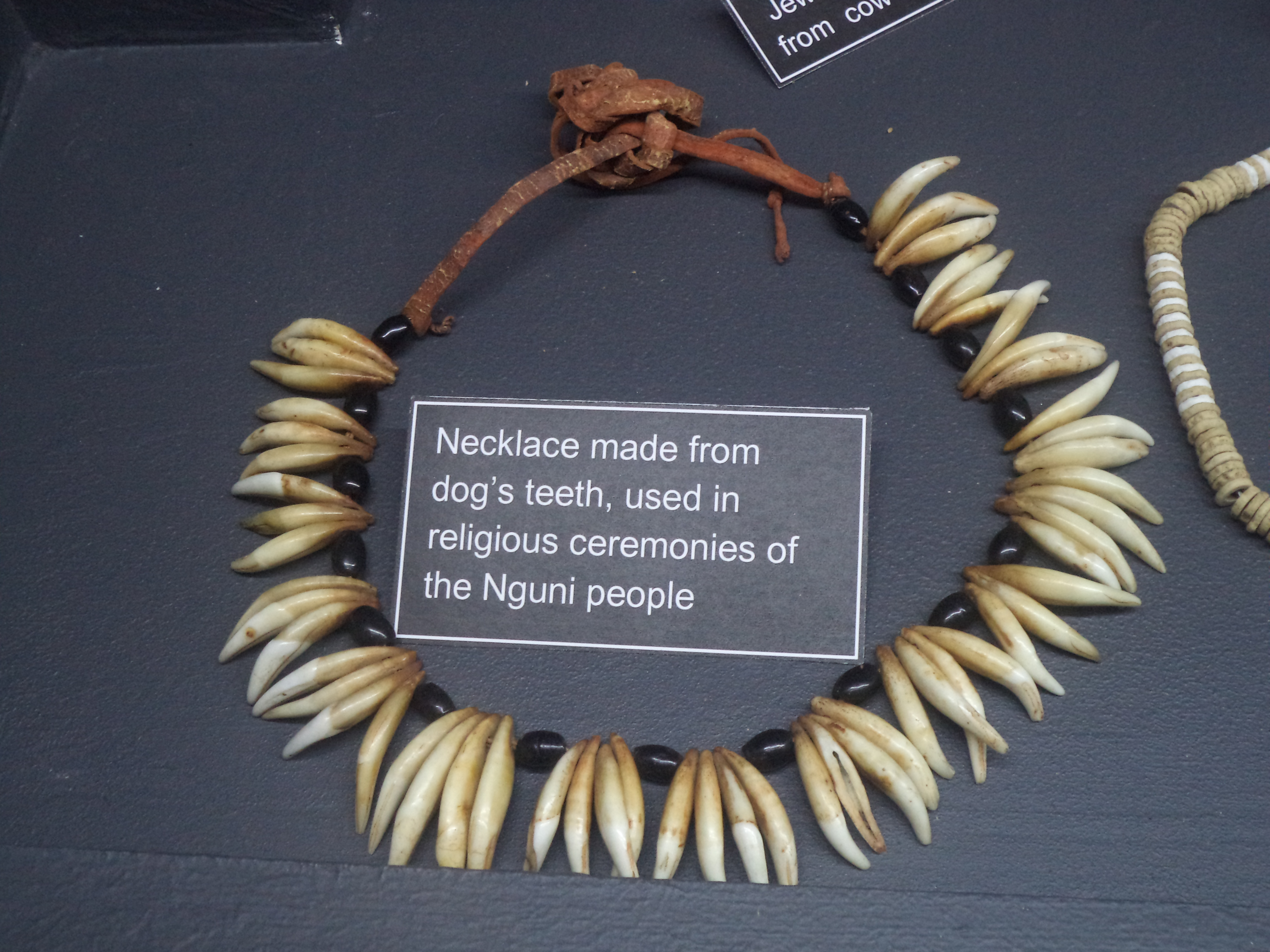
Necklace made from dog's teeth, used in religious ceremonies of the Nguni peoples. Museum of Gems and Jewellery, Cape Town

Many versions in the historiography of southern Africa state that during the South African upheaval known as Mfecane, the Nguni peoples spread across a large part of southern Africa, absorbing, conquering, or displacing many other peoples. However, the notion of the mfecane or difaqane has been disputed by some scholars, notably Julian Cobbing. The Mfecane was initiated by Zwide and his Ndwandwes. They attacked the Hlubi and stole their cattle, leaving them destitute. The remnants of the Hlubi, under their chief Matiwane fled into what is now the Free State and attacked the Batlokwa in the Harrismith Vrede area. This displaced the Batlokwa under Mmanthatisi, and she and her people spread conflict further into the central interior. Moshoeshoe and his Bakwena sought the protection of Shaka and sent him tribute in return. When Matiwane settled at Mabolela, near present-day Hlohlolwane, Moshoeshoe complained to Shaka that this prevented him from sending his tribute, whereupon an impi was sent to drive Matiwane from this area. Matiwane fled south and raided one of the Xhosa kingdoms, which got his whole tribe annihilated by King Hintsa, at the Battle Of Mbholompo. Mmanthatisi and her Batlokwa settled near what is now Ficksburg and were followed by her son, Sekonyela, as chief of the Batlokwa. It was he who had stolen Zulu cattle that Piet Retief in his dealings with Dingane, Shaka's successor, retrieved. After the defeat of Zwide and his Ndwandwes by Shaka, two of his commanders, Soshangane and Zwengendaba, fled with their followers northward, engaging in conflict as they went. Soshangane eventually founded the Shangane nation in Mozambique and Zwengendaba moved all the way to what is now Tanzania. Mzilikazi in his flight from Shaka, depopulated the eastern highveld and northern Free State, killing the men and capturing the women to form his Matabele nation. Initially, he settled near what is now Pretoria, then moved to Mosega, near present-day Zeerust, but after his defeat by the Voortrekkers he moved to present-day Zimbabwe where he founded his capital, Bulawayo.

== Social organisation ==
Within the Nguni nations, the clan, based on male ancestry, formed the highest social unit. Each clan was led by a chieftain. Influential men tried to achieve independence by creating their own clan. The power of a chieftain often depended on how well he could hold his clan together. From about 1800, the rise of the Zulu clan of the Nguni, and the consequent Mfecane that accompanied the expansion of the Zulus under Shaka helped to drive a process of alliance and consolidation among many of the smaller clans.

For example, the kingdom of Eswatini was formed in the early nineteenth century by different Nguni groups allying with the Dlamini clan against the threat of external attack. Today, the kingdom encompasses many different clans that speak a Nguni language called Swati and are loyal to the king of Eswatini, who is also the head of the Dlamini clan.

Dlamini is a very common clan name among all documented Nguni languages (including Swati and Phuthi), associated with the AbaMbo cultural identity.

== Religion ==
Ngunis may be Christians (Catholics or Protestants), practitioners of African traditional religions or members of forms of Christianity modified with traditional African values. They also follow a mix of these two religions, or follow african spirituality.

== Constituent peoples ==
The following peoples are considered Nguni:

People	Language	Population	Distribution
Thembu	Xhosa, formerly ǀXam	3,300,000	Thembus are originally from Thembuland they are also found in the Northern parts of Eastern Cape, Lesotho and throughout South Africa.
Swazi	Swazi	2,258,000	Eswatini and South Africa around the Swazi border. Their homeland was KaNgwane.
Bhaca	Bhaca	570,000	Found in the South Eastern part of South Africa in towns that include KwaBhaca, ixopo, Bulwer and Umzimkulu.
Phuthi	Phuthi	80,000	Near the Lesotho-South Africa border in the Transkei region.
Lala Nguni	Lala	A few hundred	Originally in coastal Kwazulu Natal, now found in ENgcobo, Eastern Cape, Ethekwini, Maputo, Delagoa Bay, Inanda, oThongathi, Mangangeni, Elandskop, Camperdown etc.
Northern Transvaal Ndebele	Sumayela Ndebele		Primarily in Mokopane, but also in Hammanskraal and around Polokwane
Hlubi	Hlubi	724,100	Near the Lesotho-South Africa border in the Transkei region.KwaZulu-Natal, Eastern Cape, Lesotho and North West provinces, with an original settlement on the Buffalo River
Zulu	Zulu	10,964,000	Originally Zululand, but now in most of Natal and as a minority in Eastern Transvaal and Gauteng. Their homeland was the northern part of Natal.
Xhosa	Xhosa	8,478,000	The original Nguni people. Their traditional homeland stretched from the Gamtoos River in Eastern Cape to Mzimkhulu River in Natal and were referred to by other Bantus as the AbeNguni.
Xesibe	Xhosa	800,000	North-Eastern Parts of Eastern Cape Province, Southern Parts of KwaZulu-Natal.
Southern Ndebele (Note: Original Zunda-speaking groups joined by fleeing populations after and during the Mfecane.)	Southern Ndebele	659,000	Central Transvaal
Mfengu	Xhosa, formerly Old Mfengu	1,000,000	Fingoland which is in Eastern Cape, South Africa, and also located in Zimbabwe Mbembesi.
Mpondo	Xhosa (Mpondo dialect)	5,000,000	Pondoland is a natural region on the South African shores of the Indian Ocean. It is located in the coastal belt of the Eastern Cape province.
AmaMpondomise	Xhosa (Mpondomise dialect)	3,000,000	Eastern Cape and Ciskei, Transkei throughout South Africa.
Northern Ndebele (Matabele/Mthwakazi)	Northern Ndebele	1,599,000	Matabeleland Zimbabwe
Ngoni	Tumbuka, Chewa, and Nyanja.	2,044,000	Malawi, Zambia
Total	Nguni languages	28,801,000	

=== Notes ===
Ngoni people by ethnicity are found in Malawi (under Paramount Chief Mbelwa and Maseko Paramouncy), Zambia (under Paramount Chief Mpezeni), Mozambique and Tanzania (under Chief Zulu Gama). In Malawi and Zambia, they speak a mixture of the languages of the people they conquered, such as Chewa, Nsenga and Tumbuka.
