= List of Hlubi kings =

This list of Hlubi kings presents the AmaHlubi kings and regents in chronological order, with reigns listed from Nguni, beginning in 1230, through the current king, Muziwenkosi Hadebe (Langalibalele II), whose reign began in 1974. The article also provides a separate list of Hlubi chiefs.

== Kings ==
King	Reign
Nguni	1230–1300
Chibi	1300–1325
Lubelo	1325–1350
Busobengwe (Bhungane I)	1350–1370
Fulathel’ilanga	1370–1390
Bhele	1390–1410
Lufelelwenja	1410–1430
Sidwaba (Nkomo)	1430–1450
Mhuhu	1450–1470
Mpembe	1470–1490
Mhlanga	1510–1530
Musi	1530–1550
Masoka	1550–1570
Ndlovu	1570–1590
Mntungwa	1590-1600
Dlamini	1600–1625
Mthimkhulu I	1625–1650
Ncobo and later, Hadebe	1650–1675
Dlomo I	1675–1710
Mashiya	1710-1720
Ntsele	1735–1760
Bhungane II	1760–1800
Mthimkhulu II (Ngwadlazibomvu)	1800–1818
Mpangazitha (Pakalita) (Regent)	1818–1825
Mahwanqa (Regent)	1825–1839
Dlomo II and later, Mthethwa (commonly known as Langalibalele I)	1839–1889
Siyephu (Mandiza)	1897–1910
Tatazela (Mthunzi)	1926–1956
Mshikashika Hadebe (Regent)	1956–1968
Johnson Hadebe (Regent)	1968–1974
Muziwenkosi Hadebe (Langalibalele ll)	1974–

== Chiefs ==
- Luphindo
- Ludidi
- Hadebe
- Mdletye
- Ntaba
- Zibi
- Dlomo
- Magadla
- Mehlomakulu
- Masoka
- Siphambo
- Ntsele/Nasele
- Makhayingi
- Sibizo
- Mashiya
- Gidimisana (Mlambo Nation)
