= Radebe =

South African surname

Radebe is a South African surname and also a name of the amaHlubi king called Hadebe who succeeded King Ncobo. Radebe is from royalty. The AmaHlubi, also known as amaMpembhe are a sub-group of the eMbo ethnic group. The Escourt (in KZN province) royal house is still waiting for the AmaHlubi kingship to be recognized by the South African government. The kingship can be traced back to Bhungane kaNsele who was king of the Hlubi tribe, and famous for his mystic and southern African traditional healing abilities.

Notable people with the surname include:

- Archie Radebe (c. 1959–2015), South African football player and coach
- Bridgette Radebe, South African businesswoman
- David Radebe (born 1979), South African football striker
- Inny Radebe (born 1995), South African rugby union player
- Jeff Radebe (born 1953), South African politician
- Johannes Radebe (born 1987), South African dancer
- Lucas Radebe (born 1969), South African footballer
- Makhosazana Radebe, South African politician
- Ntuthuko Radebe (born 1994), a South African footballer
- Samkelo Radebe (born 1989), South African Paralympic sprint runner and high jumper
- Senzo Radebe (born 26 May 1993), South African actor
