= Xesibe people =

Xesibe people AmaXesibe
Total population
- 1 million

Regions with significant populations
- Eastern Cape, KwaZulu-Natal South Africa

Languages
- IsiXhosa, IsiZulu

Religion
- uThixo

Related ethnic groups
- Mpondo, Mpondomise, Zulu, Swati,

The Xesibe People are a Nguni-speaking people that are found in the North-Eastern Parts of Eastern Cape Province, South Africa and the Southern Parts of KwaZulu-Natal, South Africa.

Spirit possession appears among them, and the majority of possessed are married women. The condition of spirit possession among them is called intwaso. Those who develop the condition of intwaso are regarded as having a special calling to divine the future. They are first treated with sympathy, and then with respect as they develop their abilities to foretell the future.
