= Langalibalele II =

King of Kings Langalibalele II KaTatazela Isilo King Langalibalele II
- INkosi yamaKhosi amaHlubi; Ingonyama yesizwe samaHlubi
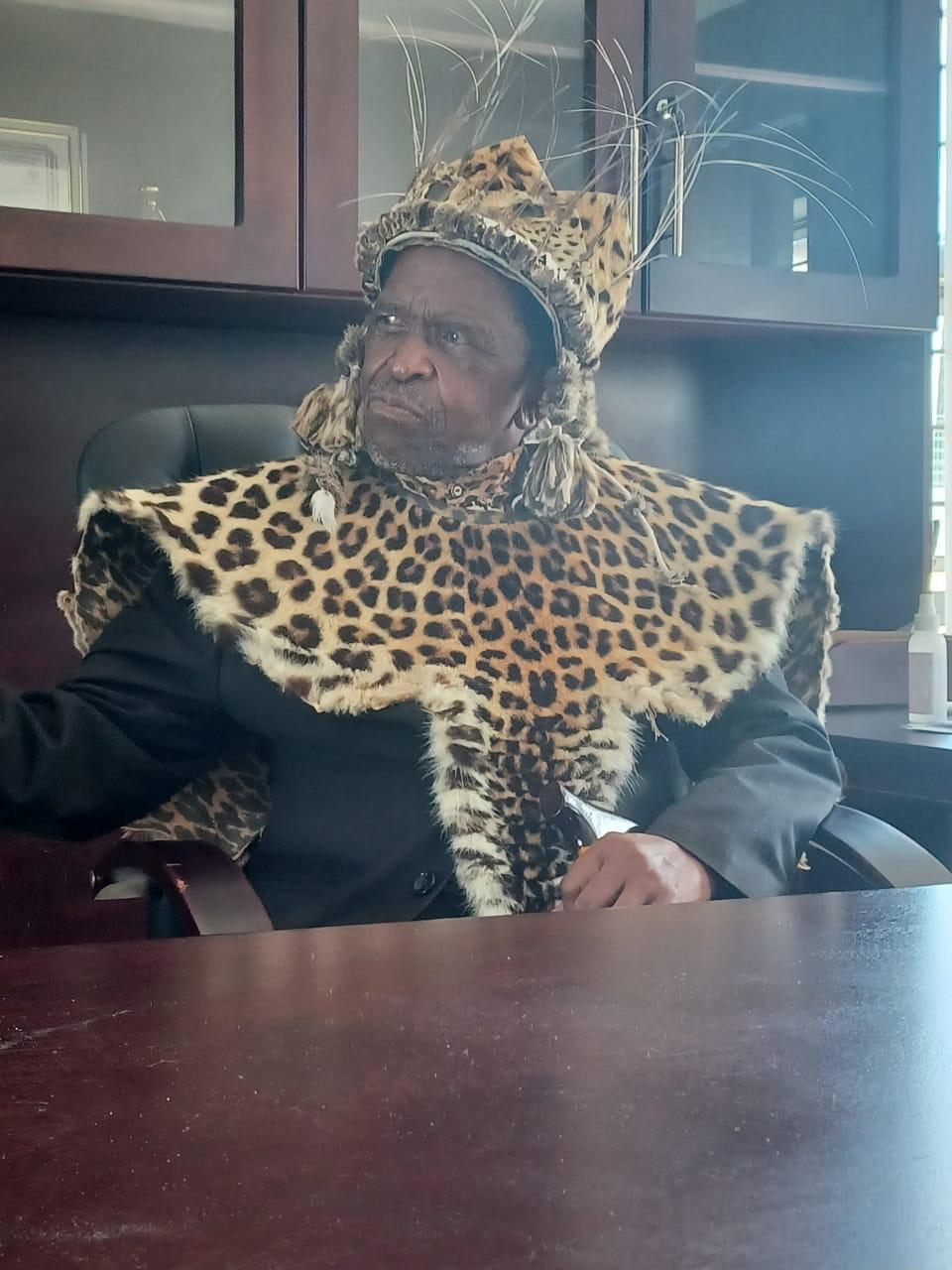

King of AmaHlubi
- Reign: 1974 - present
- Coronation: September 1976
- Predecessor: Johnson Hadebe (Regent)
- Born: 27 May 1948 (age 78); Estcourt, Kwazulu-Natal, South Africa
- Spouse: Queen Phumaphi Dlamini Hadebe
- Issue: Prince Bhekamahlubi Hadebe Prince Mandlenkosi Hadebe Princess Zibuyile Zamahlubi Hadebe Prince Sondezi Hadebe
Names
- Muziwenkosi Johannes Hadebe
Regnal name
- Langalibalele II
- House: House of Mthimkhulu
- Father: Tatazela kaSiyephu

Muziwenkosi Hadebe (born 27 May 1948) widely known as Langalibalele II is the reigning King of the Hlubi people of South Africa. The Hlubi people are still contesting for the official recognition of their kingship and nation by the South African government..
