= Ntsele =

18th century King of AmaHlubi Kingdom

Nsele

Emperor of AmaHlubi
- Reign: 1735-1760
- Successor: Bhungane II
- Died: 1760
- Issue: Bhungane II ,Sondezi, Mualle/Mwali

Nsele KaMashiya was the Emperor of AmaHlubi from 1735 until his death in 1760. He fathered Bhungane II who ascended to the Hlubi throne in 1760. Nsele is widely known for leading the AmaHlubi in a battle against the then AmaNgwane tribe led by Tshani and came out victorious. His reign was at the pre-period of both Hlubi's prosperity led by Bhungane II (son) and the period of power-struggle and fragile state of the tribe which was at peak during Mthimkhulu II's reign (grandson). He's also hailed and widely referred to as "Nasele", especially by Hlubi residing in Eastern Cape.

Regnal titles
Preceded by King Mashiya	King of AmaHlubi Kingdom; 1744–1775	Succeeded by King Bhungane II
