= Inqawe =

Inqawe is the Xhosa term for the traditional smoking pipe used among the Xhosa people. The pipes come in many variations but are mostly made from Acacia afra or ‘mnyamanzi’ which is commonly found in the Eastern Cape. Xhosa men and women (including non-smokers) carry a pipe in a beaded tobacco bag called ‘inxili’ as part of their traditional attire when they attend rituals and traditional functions.

The longer smoking pipes are used by senior Xhosa women. These long pipes are called ‘uzalipholile’ meaning ‘he/she arrives when it is cool’ which refers to the cooling effect that drawing the smoke through a long stem has. The higher the status of the woman in the community, the longer the stem of her smoking pipe. Xhosa women can have pipes with stems that are up to 30 cm in length. Younger people of both sexes usually use a slim pipe of medium length. The shorter pipes are smoked by men.

== Women and smoking ==
Xhosa women are allowed to smoke a pipe once they have a child; with each child she bears, the pipe stem is lengthened. It is believed that the pipe used by women is longer so that when the woman breastfeeds, the smoke from the pipe does not go near the baby's face.

== Uses ==
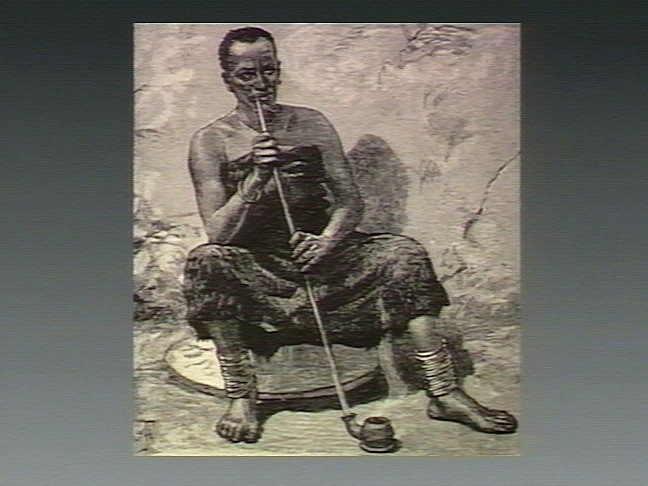
An African Chief smoking a long stemmed pipe

Pipes in daily use are generally unbeaded while those for rituals and celebrations are beaded. Traditionally when Xhosa people are gathered in groups, it is customary to pass a pipe around for everyone present to have a draw. The tobacco is shared and everyone contributes to the supply. The custom of each person using their own mouthpiece when sharing a pipe is not so much for reasons of hygiene but to prevent witchcraft since it is believed that a person can be bewitched through access to their body substances such as spittle and nail parings.

== Pipe styles ==
- Long stemmed pipes: Long stemmed pipes are called ‘inqawe ende’ (meaning long pipe), ‘umngcongo’ ( meaning beautiful object) or ‘umlolombela’ (meaning a long speech) in isiXhosa. The pipe has a removable mouthpiece. Diviners always use this pipe as a symbol of their profession, regardless of their age.
- Modern Xhosa Pipe: This pipe is known as ‘umbhekaphesheya’, which means ‘travelling across the ocean’, is a hybrid between the Xhosa traditional pipe and a European store-bought pipe. This pipe has a permanent mouthpiece and no spur. The bowl of the ‘umbhekaphesheya’ pipe points away from the stem at an angle of 45 degrees, hence the reference to pointing at the sea as the pipes opening is directed towards the sea and its alternative design is influenced by Europeans who travelled across the ocean to reach Africa. This pipe is only used by men.

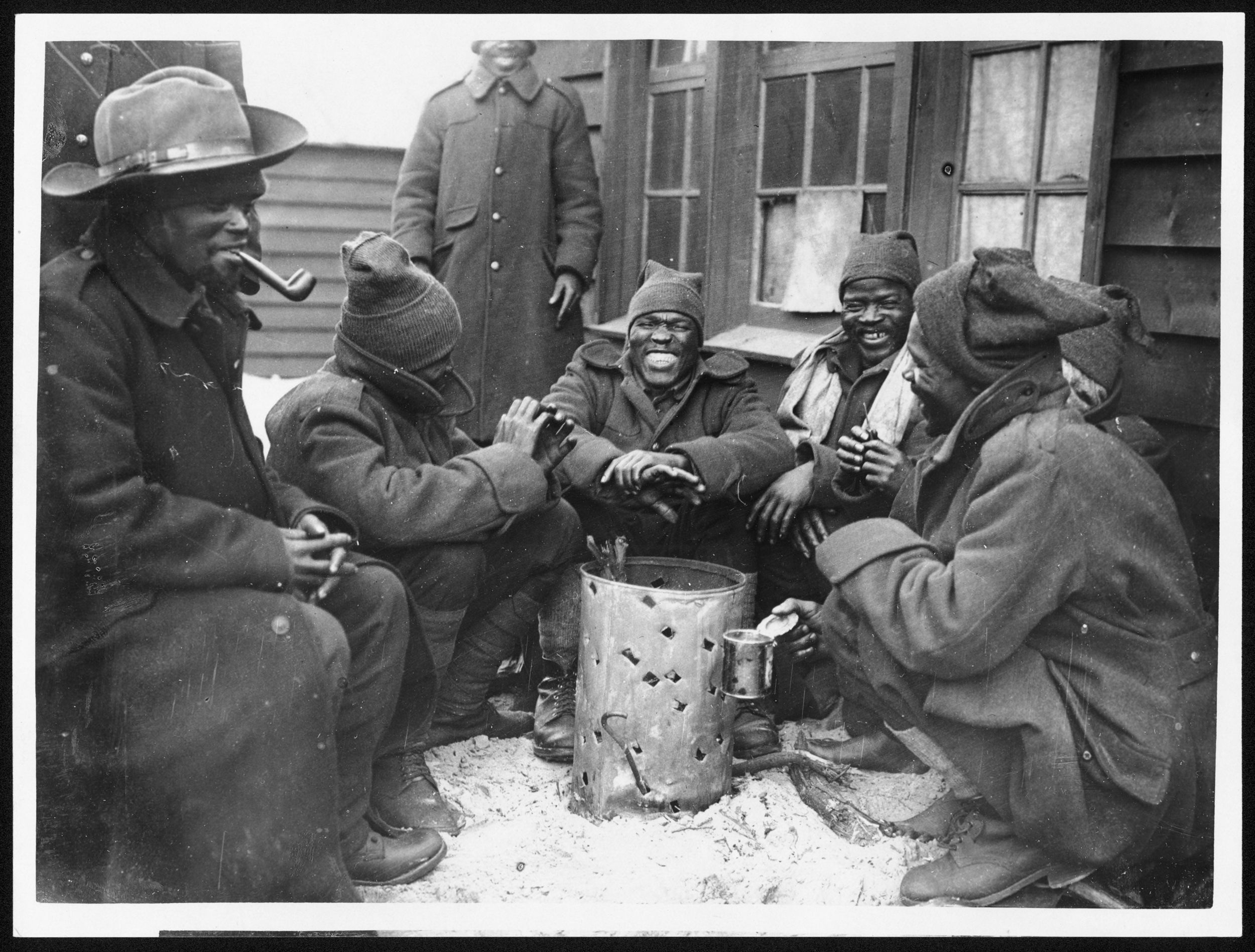
A group of Xhosa men smoking an example of the 'hybrid' smoking pipe

== Tobacco Bags ==
Tobacco is also called ‘icuba’ by the Xhosa people. The most commonly used tobacco amongst Xhosa people comes from the wild tobacco plant known as Nicotiana glauca. The tobacco is placed in tobacco bags or ‘inxili’ that are worn as a necklace. These bags are part of traditional Xhosa daily dress. Women's bags are made of cotton sheeting decorated with beadwork and braid and a few wool tassels. Those used by men are made from either cotton sheeting or the skin of a goat removed in such a way as to retain its shape. Previously, skins of wild animals such as the hyrax/dassie were also used. Many cloth bags may be carried over a man's stick as a form of ornamentation

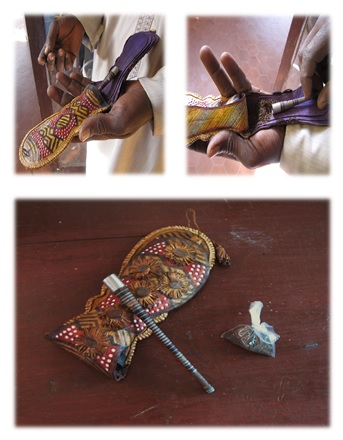
The decorated "tobacco bag" which can be worn as a necklace

== Pipe makers ==
Pipe making among amaXhosa is a specialised craft traditionally practised by men only. Even though the demand for pipes has decreased in the 21st century, as smoking is becoming less popular, there are still craftsmen who make these pipes. Pipe makers now supplement their income by making wooden spoons and yokes for oxen. Non-smokers also purchase these pipes to put in their homes as ornaments but also as a symbolic link to tradition. Some pipe makers also sell their pipes to curio shops in towns as well as holiday resorts where there is a small demand for traditional Xhosa crafts.

== Symbolism ==
The smoking of the ‘Inqawe’ is a symbol of having a relationship with the ancestors. Therefore, traditional diviners often use it in order to appease the ancestors. Smoking This pipe is used in a number of Xhosa rituals such as the ‘umhlwayelelo’ ritual which is a propitiatory rite for the ‘river people’. During this ritual a small amount of home grown traditional tobacco is presented to the ancestors by placing it in the water of a river bank. A portion of the same tobacco is kept and smoked symbolically by all the participants, even non-smokers, after the gift giving ceremony at the river.

== See also ==
- Cannabis pipe
- Bowl (smoking)
- Mpondo people
- AbaThembu
