= Bhungane II =

18th century king of AmaHlubi

King of AmaHlubi
- Reign: 1760-1801
- Predecessor: Ntsele
- Successor: Mthimkhulu
- Born: Mlotsha
- Died: 1801; KwaBahlokazi
- Issue: Mthimkhulu, Mpangazitha,Monakali,Zingelwayo ,Mndebele and Mahwanqa
- Father: Ntsele

Bhungane II kaNtsele, Bhungan'omakhulukhulu (birth name Mlotsha) was the King of AmaHlubi Kingdom from 1760 until his death in 1800. He was the father of King Mthimkhulu II also known as Ngwadlazibomvu or Jobe. He was also the grandfather to the famous King Langalibalele I. King Bhungane II was perceived as to be a gifted medicine-man (herbalist) and a rainmaking King. King Bhungane’s realm was from uMzinyathi River boarding Pongola in the north down to the Thukela river in the South. His capital was called eNgolozini and the royal palace he occupied in Alcockspruit, near Newcastle in Kwa-Zulu Natal Province was called KwaMagoloza.

King Bhungane kaNtsele is famously known for taking in the legendary King Dingiswayo of the Mthethwa Kingdom under his protection becoming his mentor. Prince Godongwana in took refuge in the Hlubi Kingdom he changed his name into Dingiswayo as a way of concealing his identity as he was fugitive of the Mthethwa nation. He spent his time learning to be warrior,king and sacred medicines from the Hlubi King. The Mthethwa Prince was gifted the medicine of kingship by King Bhungane which gave him the strength and legitimacy to become king of the Mthethwa Nation. Dingiswayo left the Amahlubi kingdom after being under the wing of King Bhungane kaNtsele, Dingiswayo defeated his brother Mawewe becoming the powerful king of the Mthethwa Kingdom.

Regnal titles
Preceded by Ntsele	King of Amahlubi; 1760-1800	Succeeded by Mthimkhulu II
