= Xhosa people =

Bantu ethnic group

Xhosa people AmaXhosa
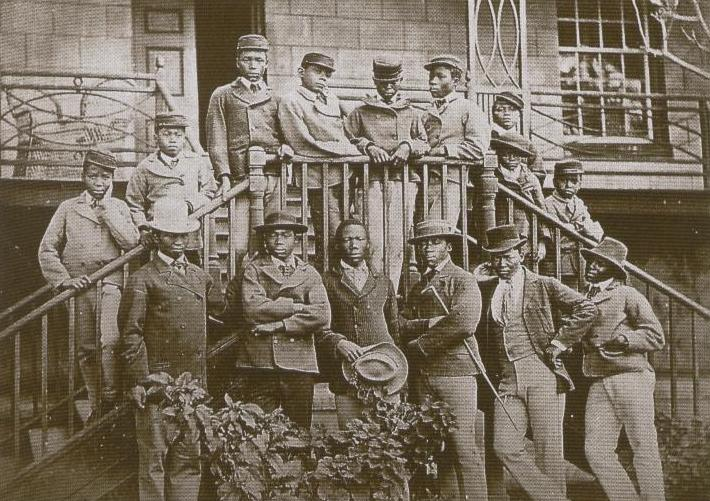
- Xhosa graduates at Zonnebloem College in 1860, Cape Town, Cape Colony

Total population
- 9,660,004

Regions with significant populations
- South Africa: 9,415,133 ~ (2022 estimate) Eastern Cape: 5,102,053; Western Cape: 2,326,704; Gauteng: 862,124; KwaZulu-Natal: 405,140; Free State: 320,645; North West: 225,023; Northern Cape: 101,062; Mpumalanga: 50,225 Limpopo: 22,157
- Zimbabwe: 200,000
- Botswana: 12,000
- Namibia: 10,000
- Lesotho: 23,000

Languages
- IsiXhosa, IsiZulu, Sesotho, Sepedi, English, Afrikaans

Religion
- uThixo, Qamata, Christianity

Related ethnic groups
- Southern Ndebele, Zulu, Hlubi, Swati, and Northern Ndebele, Griqua, Khoisan, San people, Khoekhoe, Phuthi people, /Xam

Xhosa
- Person: UmXhosa
- People: AmaXhosa
- Language: IsiXhosa
- Country: KwaXhosa

The Xhosa people (/ˈkɔːsə/ KAW-sə, /ˈkoʊsə/ KOH-sə; Xhosa pronunciation: [kǁʰɔ́ːsa]) are an ethnic group in South Africa, Zimbabwe, Botswana, Namibia and Lesotho. They are the second largest ethnic group in South Africa and are native speakers of the isiXhosa language.

The Xhosa people are descendants of Nguni clans who settled in the southeastern part of Southern Africa, displacing the original inhabitants, the Khoisan. Archaeological evidence suggests that the Xhosa people have inhabited the area since the 7th century.

Presently, over ten million Xhosa-speaking people are distributed across Southern Africa. In 1994 the self-governing bantustans of Transkei and Ciskei were incorporated into South Africa, becoming the Eastern Cape province.

As of 2003, the majority of Xhosa speakers, approximately 5,369,672, lived in the Eastern Cape, followed by the Western Cape (approximately 1 million), Gauteng (671,045), the Free State (246,192), KwaZulu-Natal (219,826), North West (214,461), Mpumalanga (46,553), the Northern Cape (51,228), and Limpopo (14,225).

There is a small but significant Xhosa-speaking (Mfengu) community in Zimbabwe, and their language, isiXhosa, is recognized as an official national language.

== History ==
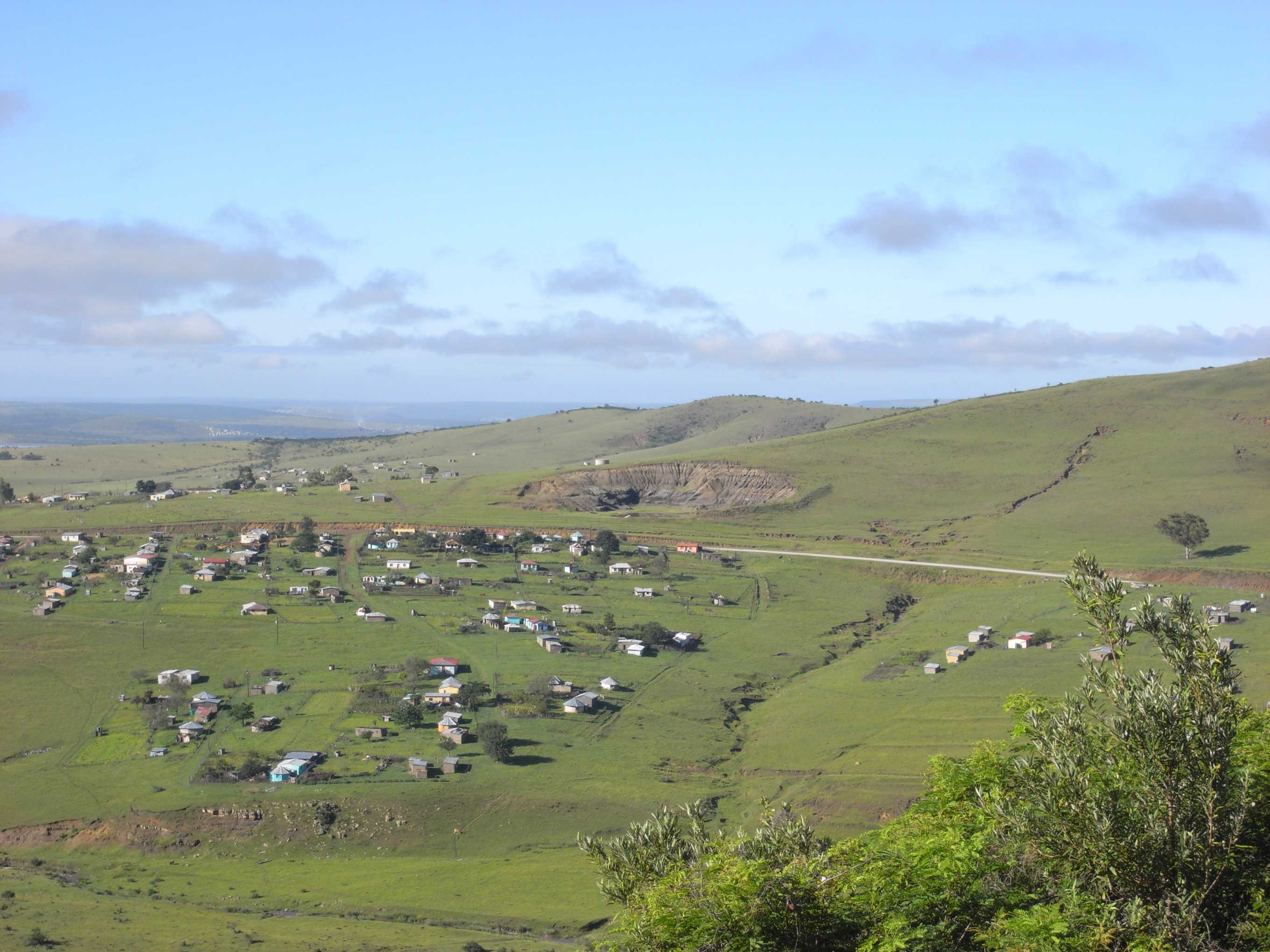
Xhosa village in Eastern Cape.

Some archaeological evidence has been discovered that suggests that Xhosa-speaking people have lived in the Eastern Cape area since at least the 7th century. The modern Xhosa are Nguni people.

=== Origins ===
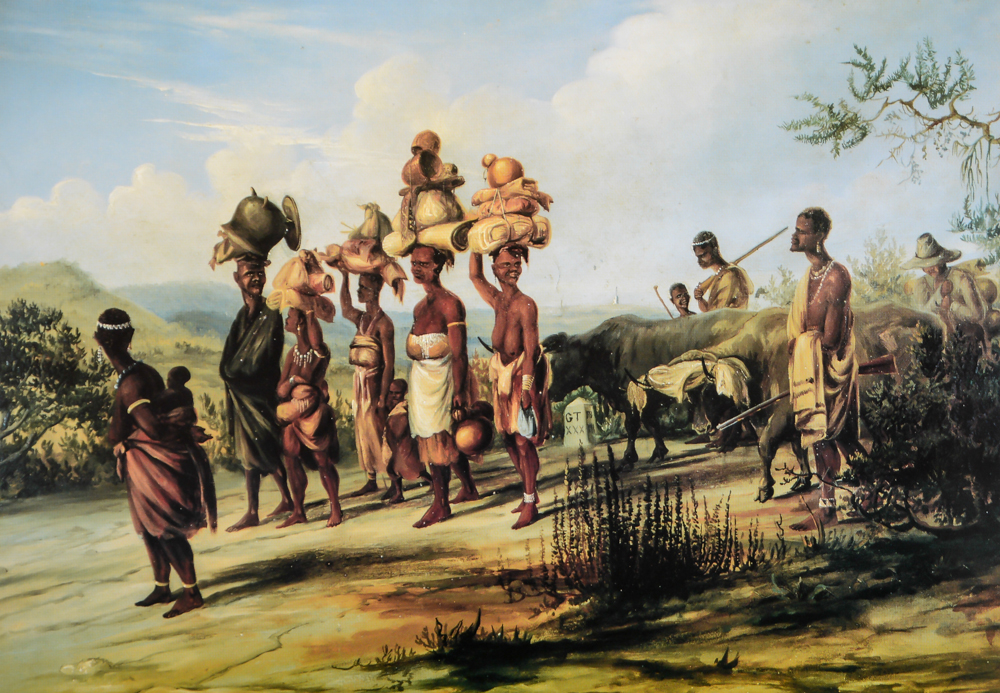
An illustration of a group of Xhosa people by Thomas Baines (illustrated in 1848).

The Xhosa people are descendants of the ancestors of Ngunis. Upon crossing mountains and rivers into what is now South Africa, these farm-working agropastoralists brought their cattle and goats with them and absorbed the weaker San groups in the region. They also brought weapons, notably their assegais and their shields and would form groups or chiefdoms and kingdoms mainly in what is now the Eastern Cape.

=== Kingdom ===
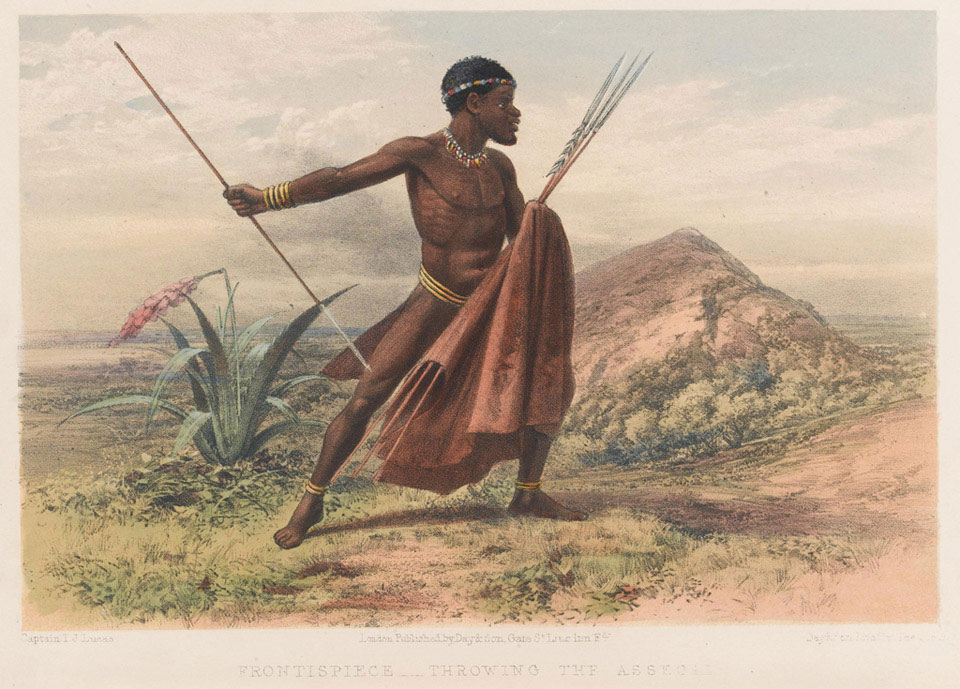
Xhosa spearman

According to oral tradition, the modern Xhosa Kingdom was founded somewhere before the 15th century by Tshawe (whom the royal clan of the Xhosas is named after) who overthrew his brother Cirha (assisted by his brother Jwarha) with the help of the amaNgwevu clan of the amaMpondomise Kingdom. Tshawe and his army then incorporated formerly independent Nguni clans into the Xhosa Kingdom. Khoekhoe tribes were incorporated, including the Inqua, the Giqwa, and the amaNgqosini (both Khoi and Sotho origin).

Formerly independent clans (many of Khoekhoe origin) and chiefdoms in the region became tributary to the amaTshawe and spoke isiXhosa as their primary language.

With the settlement of the Cape by Europeans in 1652, the native Khoisan populations were gradually pushed eastwards until, in the 1700s, the borders of the Cape Colony had pushed populations far enough east (with relations between colonist and native significantly broken down) to create a critical mass of hostile population to resist the colonists in the Eastern Cape. This sparked off the Cape frontier wars, which represent some of the longest military resistance to colonialism.

The historical result would be the containment of large portions of the Cape native population into native reserves in the easternmost part of the Cape. However, these populations would also continually serve as labour inside the Cape Colony. These native reserves would be re-branded "homelands" in the 20th century and would only be fully dismantled in 1994, with populations moving back into the wider Cape.

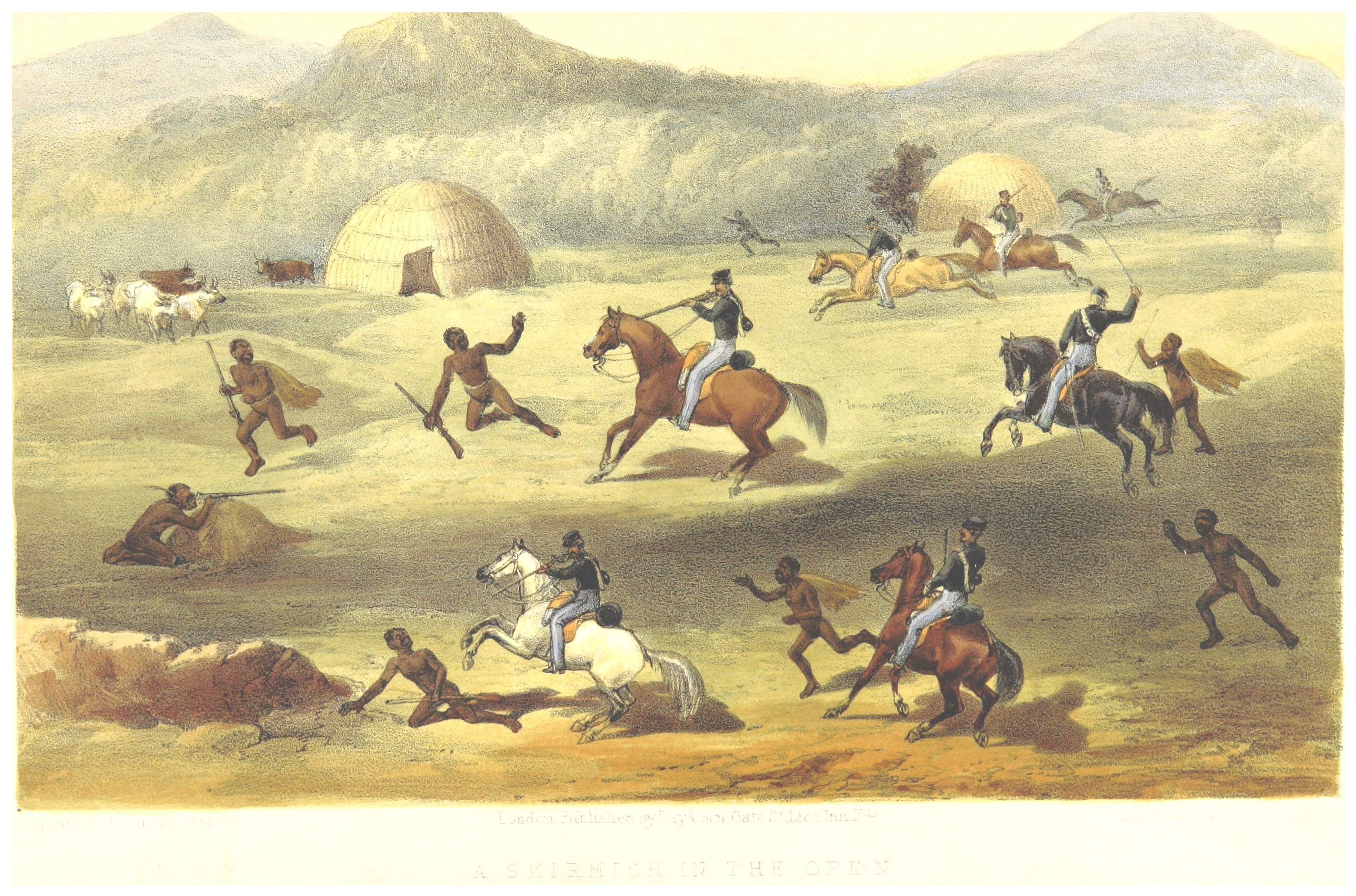
Skirmish during the Xhosa Wars

During the 19th century, the Xhosas fought and repulsed many tribes that were escaping the Zulus in the Colony of Natal, this was during the historical mfecane. Those who were accepted were assimilated into the Xhosa cultural way of life and followed Xhosa traditions. The Xhosas called these various tribes AmaMfengu, meaning wanderers, and were made up of clans such as the amaBhaca, amaBhele, amaHlubi, amaZizi and Rhadebe.

Xhosa unity and ability to fight off colonial encroachment was to be weakened by the famines and political divisions that followed the cattle-killing movement of 1856–1858. Historians now view this movement as a millennialist response, both directly to a lung disease spreading among Xhosa cattle at the time, and less directly to the stress to Xhosa society caused by the continuing loss of their territory and autonomy.

Some historians argue that this early absorption into the wage economy is the ultimate origin of the long history of trade union membership and political leadership among Xhosa people. That history manifests itself today in high degrees of Xhosa representation in the leadership of the African National Congress (ANC), South Africa's ruling political party in the government.

== Culture ==
=== Marriage ===
Xhosa marriage, umtshato, is one that is filled with a number of customs and rituals which relate to the upkeep of Xhosa traditional practices. These rituals have been practiced for decades by the Xhosa people and have been incorporated into modern day Xhosa marriages as well. The purpose of the practices is to bring together two different families and to give guidance to the newly wed couple throughout.

==== Ukuthwalwa ====
To start off the procedures the male intending to marry goes through Ukuthwalwa which entails him choosing his future bride and making his intentions of marriage known, however this practice was not done by all the tribes within the Xhosa people. In modern day, the man and woman would most likely have been in courtship or a relationship prior to Ukuthwalwa. Decades before Ukuthwalwa would entail legal bridal abduction, where the man could choose a woman of his liking to be his bride and go into negotiations with the family of the bride without her knowledge or consent. She would have to abide to the marriage as per tradition.

==== Isiduko ====
Following Ukuthwala, the man will then be in discussion with his parents or relatives to inform them of his choice in bride. During this discussion the clan name, isiduko, of the woman is discussed. If it were found that the woman and the man share the same clan name they would not be allowed to proceed with the marriage as it is said that people with the same clan name are of the same relation and cannot be wed.

==== Ikhazi ====
Once discussions with the family are complete and satisfactory information about the woman is acquired then the family of the man will proceed to appoint marriage negotiators. It is these very negotiators that will travel to the family of the woman to make known the man and his intentions. Once the negotiators reach the family of the woman they will be kept in the kraal, inkundla, of the woman's family. If the family does not possess a kraal they will simply be kept outside the household as they will not be allowed to enter the household without the acknowledgment and acceptance of the woman's family. This is where the lobola (dowry) negotiations will begin.

The family of the woman will give them a bride-price and a date for which they must return to pay that price. The bride-price is dependent on numerous things such as her level of education, the wealth status of her family in comparison to that of the man's family, what the man stands to gain in the marriage and the overall desirability of the woman. The payment of the bride-price could be in either cattle or money depending on the family of the woman. Modern Xhosa families would prefer money as most are situated in the urban cities where there would be no space or permits for livestock.

Upon return of the man's family on the given date, they will pay the bride-price and bring along gifts of offering such as livestock and alcoholic beverages, iswazi, to be drunk by the family of the bride. Once the lobola from the man's negotiators is accepted then they will be considered married by the Xhosa tradition and the celebrations would commence. These include slaughtering of the livestock as a grateful gesture to their ancestors.

==== Ukuyalwa ====
To solidify their unity the family of the bride will head to the groom's household where the elders will address her with regard to how to carry herself and dress appropriately at her newly found household, this is called Ukuyalwa. Furthermore, a new name will also be given to her by the women of the groom's family and this name signifies the bond of the two families.

=== Burials ===
Burial practices and customs include a specific sequence of events and rituals which need to be performed in order to regard a funeral as dignified. Once the family has been notified that a member has died, the extended family comes together in preparation for the burial of the deceased.

The "umkhapho" (to accompany) ritual is performed in order to accompany the spirit of the deceased to the land of the ancestors. The local male clan leader or his proxy is the one who facilitates the process. The purpose of umkhapho is to keep the bonds between the deceased person and the bereaved alive so that the deceased may be able to return later and communicate as an ancestor. During this ritual, an animal such as a goat is slaughtered. A larger animal like a cow may also be slaughtered for an important person like a head of the family whilst a goat without a blemish may be slaughtered for others.

Further customs include the emptying the main bedroom of the bereaving family, known as 'indlu enkulu'. This room is where most of the last respects will be paid by family and friends. The emptying of the room is done in order to create space for extended family members to be able to mourn in the main room. The first family members and/or neighbours to arrive arrange the main bedroom to accommodate this seating arrangement by placing a traditional grass mat (ukhukho) or mattress on the floor.

Mourners do not require an invitation to attend a funeral and everyone who can and would like to attend is welcome. This means that the bereaved family has to cater for an unknown number of mourners. Traditionally, mourners were fed with 'inkobe', which is boiled dried corn and water, and the corn was taken from the family food reserves as well as donated by family members and neighbours. In the 21st century, it is regarded as taboo to feed mourners with 'inkobe' and, as a result of shame, funeral catering has become a lucrative business for the industry during burial events.

On the day of burial, before extended family members disperse to their homes, the ukuxukuxa (cleansing) ritual occurs and a goat or sheep or even a fowl is slaughtered.

A cleansing ritual is done the day after the burial, in which the bereaved women of the family go to the nearest river to wash all the materials and blankets that were used by the deceased before death. Furthermore, the clothes of the deceased are removed from the house and the family members shave their hair. The shaving of hair is an indication that life continues to spring up even after death.

=== Sexuality ===
Adolescent Xhosa herding men have been known to practice ukumetsha, or intercrural sex in order to explore their sexuality.

== Language ==
Map of South Africa showing the primary Xhosa language speech area in green

Xhosa is an agglutinative tonal language categorized under Bantu linguistic classification. While the Xhosas call their language "isiXhosa", it is usually referred to as "Xhosa" in English. Written Xhosa uses a Latin alphabet–based system. Xhosa is spoken by about 18% of the South African population, and has some mutual intelligibility with Zulu, especially Zulu spoken in urban areas. Many Xhosa speakers, particularly those living in urban areas, also speak Zulu and/or Afrikaans and/or English.

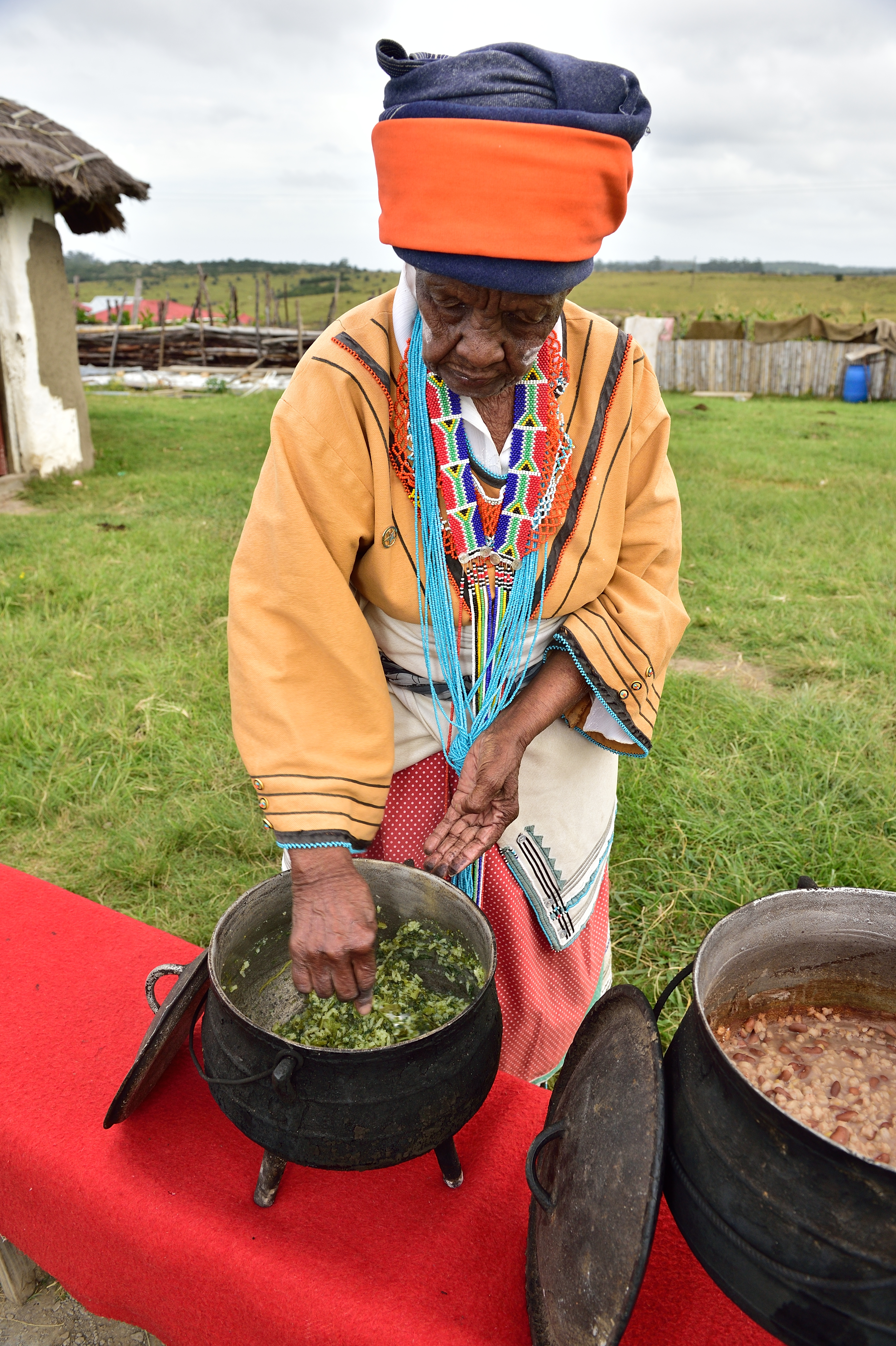
Xhosa woman preparing food for large groups of people

== Food ==
The Xhosa settled on mountain slopes of the Amatola and the Winterberg Mountains. Many streams drain into great rivers of this Xhosa territory, including the Kei and Fish Rivers. Rich soils and plentiful rainfall make the river basins good for farming and grazing making cattle important and the basis of wealth.

Traditional foods include beef (Inyama yenkomo), mutton (Inyama yegusha), and goat meat (Inyama yebhokwe), sorghum, milk (often fermented, called "amasi"), pumpkins (amathanga), Mielie-meal (maize meal), samp (umngqusho), beans (iimbotyi), vegetables, like "rhabe", wild spinach reminiscent of sorrel, "imvomvo", the sweet sap of an aloe, or "ikhowa", a mushroom that grows after summer rains.

=== Xhosa wedding ===
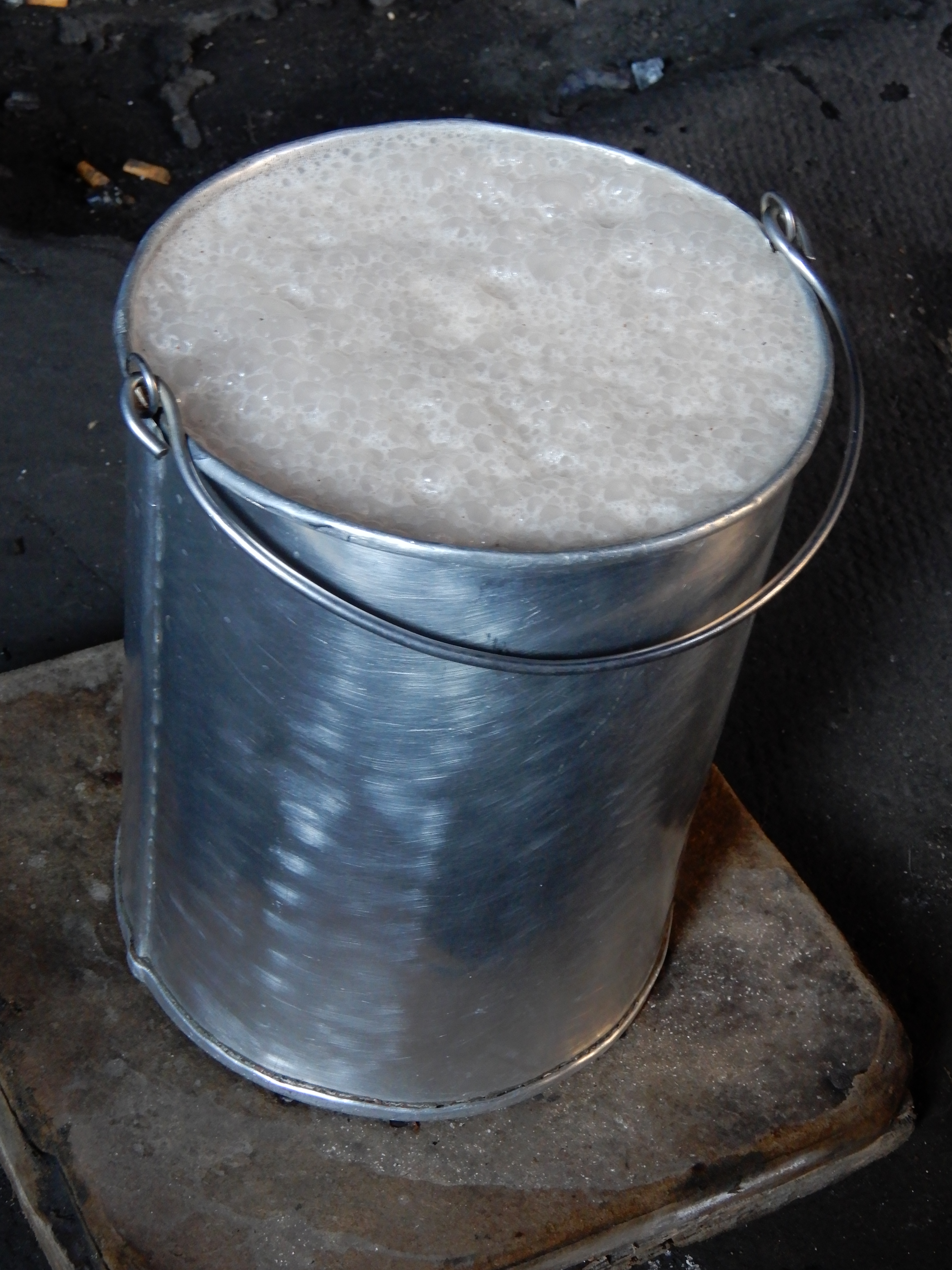
Xhosa beer Umqombothi in Langa

- Amaceba, slices of unpeeled pumpkins that are cooked in plenty of water.
- Amarhewu or mageu, soft and sour porridge
- Iinkobe, peeled off fresh maize grains, and boiled until cooked. It is eaten as a snack, preferably with salt.
- Isidudu, a soft porridge made from mealie meal. It is usually served for breakfast, with sugar and milk.
- Intyabontyi, a citron melon with white insides, eaten either raw or cooked.
- Isophi, corn with beans or peas soup
- Umcuku, fermented porridge [amarhewu], sour, slightly soft than porridge itself, mixed with dry pap [umphokoqo]; was popular in the 1900s.
- Umleqwa, a dish made with free-range chicken.
- Umngqusho, a dish made from white maize and sugar beans, a staple food for the Xhosa people.
- Umphokoqo, crumble pap
- Umqombothi, a type of beer made from fermented maize and sorghum.
- Umvubo, (Amasi) sour milk mixed with umphokoqo, commonly eaten by the Xhosa.
- Umbhako, a loaf of bread, commonly made with homemade dough. Normally round, from baking pots
- Umfino, Wild Spinach/Cabbage called imifino, spinach mixed with mealie meal.
- Umqa, a dish made of pumpkin and mielie meal (maize meal)
- Umxoxozi, a pumpkin that is cooked before it is fully ripened.

== Art ==
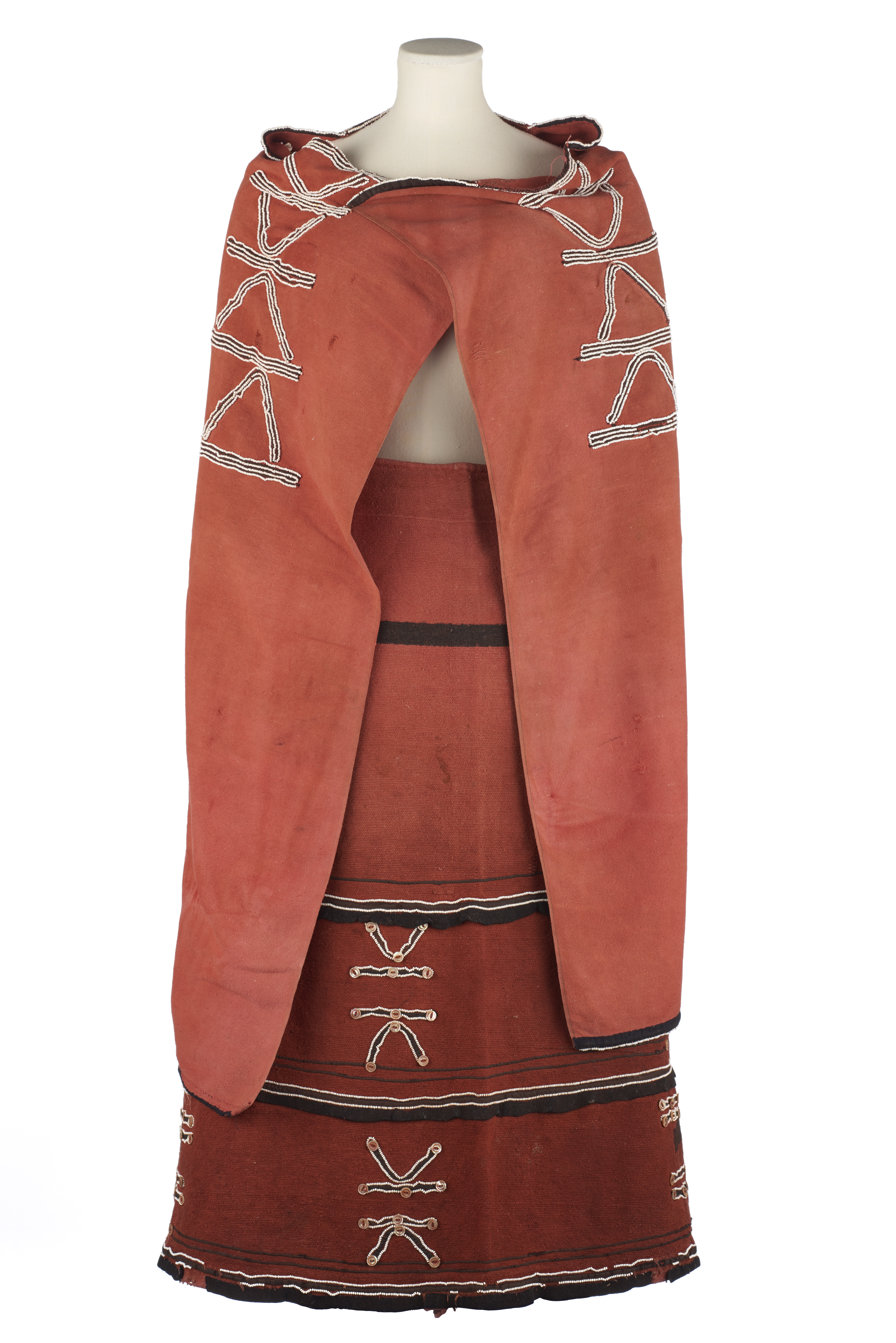
Xhosa women's outfit, made from cotton blanket fabric coloured with red ochre and decorated with glass beads, mother of pearl buttons and black felt trim

Traditional music features drums, rattles, whistles, flutes, mouth harps, and stringed-instruments and especially group singing accompanied by hand clapping. There are songs for various ritual occasions; one of the best-known Xhosa songs is a wedding song called "Qongqothwane", performed by Miriam Makeba as "Click Song #1". Besides Makeba, several modern groups record and perform in Xhosa. Missionaries introduced the Xhosa to Western choral singing. "Nkosi Sikelel' iAfrika", part of the National anthem of South Africa is a Xhosa hymn written in 1897 by Enoch Sontonga.

The first newspapers, novels, and plays in Xhosa appeared in the 19th century, and Xhosa poetry is also gaining renown.

Several films have been shot in the Xhosa language. U-Carmen eKhayelitsha is a modern remake of Bizet's 1875 opera Carmen. It is shot entirely in Xhosa, and combines music from the original opera with traditional African music. It takes place in the Cape Town township of Khayelitsha. The movie Black Panther also features the Xhosa language.

=== Xhosa beadwork ===
Beads are small round objects made of glass, wood, metal, nutshell, bone seed and the likes, which are then pierced for stringing. Before glass beads were introduced, people used natural materials to make beads. Xhosa people relied on the San to sell beads to them through trade or barter exchange. Xhosa people would give hemp to the San in exchange for beads. The beads made by the San were made out of ostrich egg shells which were chipped to small size, bored and polished and strung into sinews. Producing them took a long time, so they were scarce, highly priced, valued and in demand. It is recorded that it was only in the 1930s that the Portuguese introduced glass beads through trade.

Adornments serve a particular purpose across different cultures as social markers. They are used to ascertain where one belongs to with regard to identity, history and geographical location. They reveal personal information with regard to age and gender and social class as some beads were meant to be worn by royalty. Beadwork creates a sense of belonging and cultural identity and traditions hence people draw their cultural ways of living and meanings, as Xhosa people use them as social markers. Xhosa people believe that the beads also create a link between the living and the ancestors as diviners use them during rituals. Thus beads have some spiritual significance.

Social identities/markers with regard to age, gender, grade, marital status, social rank or role and the spiritual state can be ascertained through Xhosa beadwork. Symbolic references are drawn from the beads through the colour, pattern, formation and motifs. However, it ought to be taken into cognizance that some of these messages are limited to a certain group or between two people. In Xhosa culture beads represent the organizational framework of the people and the rites of passage that people have gone through as the beads are representative of the stages of one's life. Motifs on the beads often used include trees, diamonds, quadrangles, chevrons, triangles, circles, parallel lines that form a pattern that is exclusive to certain age groups. Although the beadwork has some cultural significance with certain motifs having exclusive meanings, the creator of the beadwork has creative control and can create and draw meaning from individual preference. Thus the meanings drawn from the beadwork are not rigidly set.

Among the Thembu (a tribe in the Eastern Cape often erroneously referred to be a Xhosa tribe), after circumcision, the men wore, and still wear, skirts, turbans and a wide bead collar. A waistcoat, long necklaces, throat bands, armbands, leggings and belts are part of his regalia. The dominant colours in the beadwork are white and navy blue, with some yellow and green beads symbolizing fertility and a new life, respectively. Xhosa people regard white as the colour of purity and mediation; white beads are still used as offerings to spirits or to the creator. Amagqirha/diviners use white beads when communicating with the ancestors. These diviners also carry with them beaded spears, which are associated with the ancestors that inspire the diviner; beaded horns; and calabashes, to hold medicinal products or snuff. "Amageza", a veil made of beads, is also part of their regalia, they use these beads by swaying them in someone's eyes so as to induce a trance-like state.

Inkciyo is a beaded skirt that serves as a garment covering the pubic area. Among the Pondo people (Xhosa clan) the beads are turquoise and white in colour. This skirt is worn during a virginity testing ceremony among Xhosa people undergoing their rites of passage into womanhood.

Xhosa beadwork and other cultural beadworks have cultural ties but nowadays beads are also worn as fashion pieces which means anyone can wear them without having to belong to that cultural group.

== Clothing ==
The Xhosa culture has a traditional dress code informed by the individuals social standing portraying different stages of life. The 'red blanket people' (Xhosa people) have a custom of wearing red blankets dyed with red ochre, the intensity of the colour varying from tribe to tribe. Other clothing includes beadwork and printed fabrics. Although in general, Xhosa lifestyle has been adapted to Western traditions, the Xhosa people still wear traditional attire for special cultural activities. The various tribes have their own variations of traditional dress which includes the colour of their garments and beadwork. This allows for different Xhosa groups to be able to be distinguishable from one another due to their different styles of dress. The Gcaleka women, for instance, encase their arms and legs in beads and brass bangles and some also wear neck beads.

=== Description ===
- Incebetha is a small blanket that is used as a bra. It is pinned or adorned with beads. The process of making 'incebetha' is called 'uRhaswa'.
- 'Ifulu' is a garment that is worn underneath, below the belt. 'Ifulu' is covered by the 'isikhakha' or 'umbhaco' and is made of a blanket. It is also adorned with beads through 'urhaswa'.
- 'Iqhiya' is a cloth that is fitted to the head and covered with beads. Women then wear a small and light weight blanket on the waist called 'uxakatha'.
- Women make bracelets with beads, called 'intsimbi' or 'amaso', which they wear on their feet. 'Intsimbi' or 'amaso' is also worn around the waist. 'Intsimbi' or 'amaso' is made with small wires or flexible material. 'Imitsheke' is worn on the wrist. A small hand bag is worn called 'ingxowa'.

=== Men ===
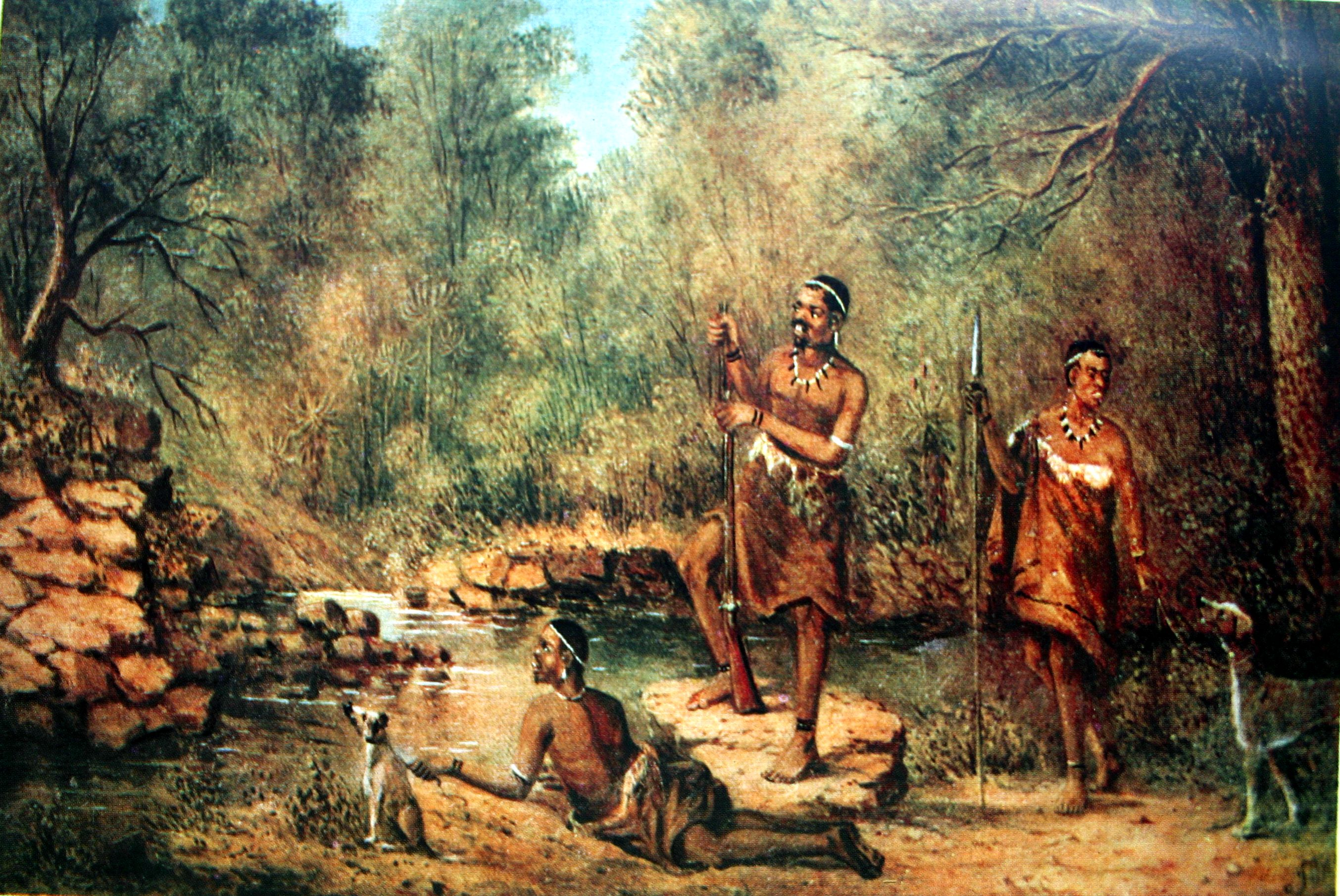
Xhosa men resting during a hunt.

Xhosa men traditionally worked with livestock, hunted, or were warriors. As a result, many traditional outfits for men include animal skins. Men often wear goatskin bags in which to carry essentials such as tobacco and a knife. The bag is usually made from skin that had been removed in one piece, cured without removing the hair, and turned inside out. On special occasions such as weddings or initiation ceremonies, Xhosa men wear embroidered skirts with a rectangular cloth over the left shoulder. Alternatively, a tunic and strands of beaded necklaces can be worn.

==== Description ====
Men wear 'ingcawa' a white and black blanket, adorned with 'ukurhaswa'. Men wear beads around their neck. 'Isichebe' is a short bead while 'Isidanga' is a long bead necklace with different colors. Men wear beads around their wrists and foot called 'amaso'. Beads that are worn on the head are called 'unngqa' or 'igwala'. Men smoke pipes that are decorated by 'ukurhaswa'. The traditional smoking pipes are called 'umbheka phesheya'.

== Xhosas in modern society ==
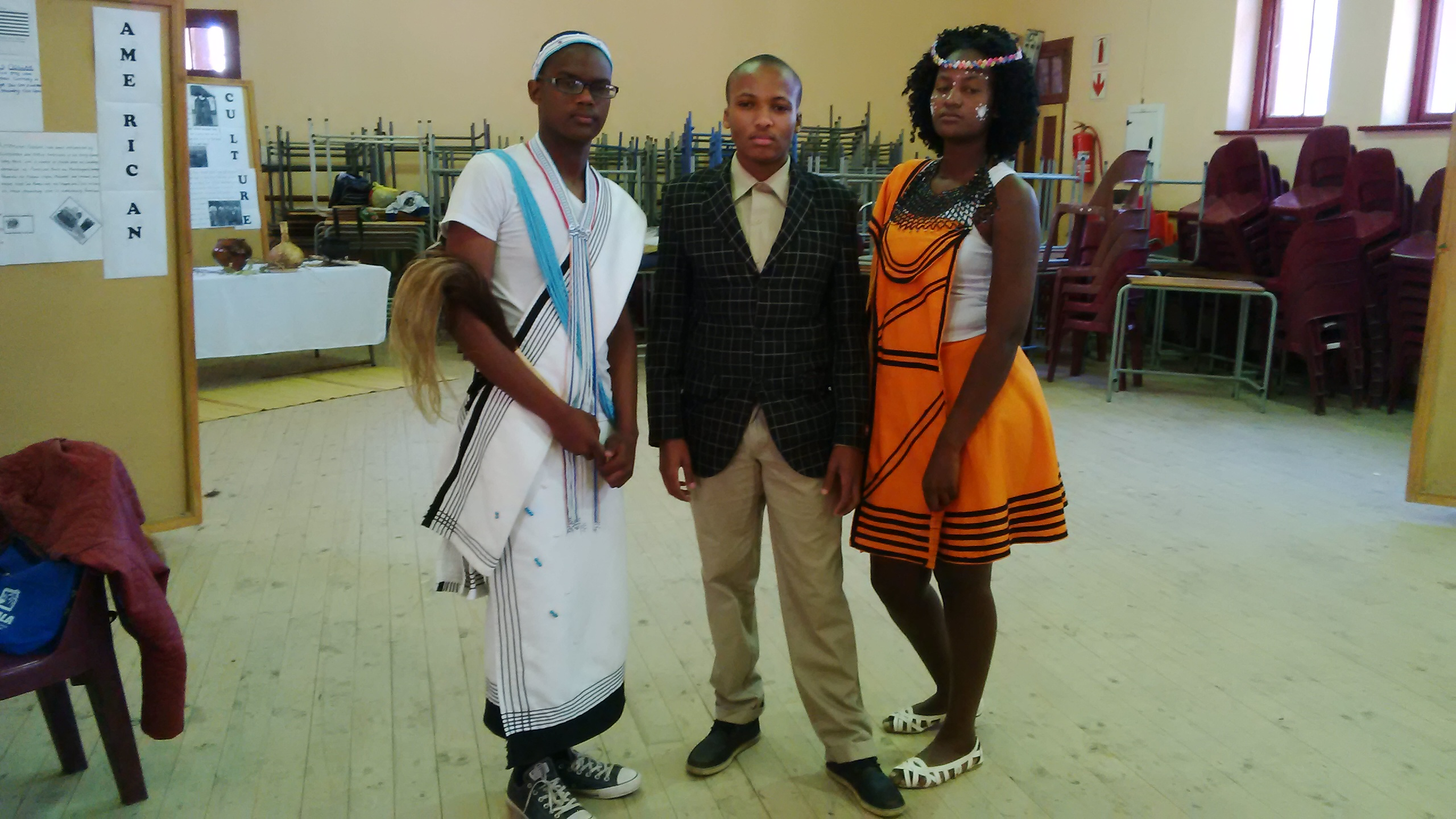
Modern Xhosa attire.

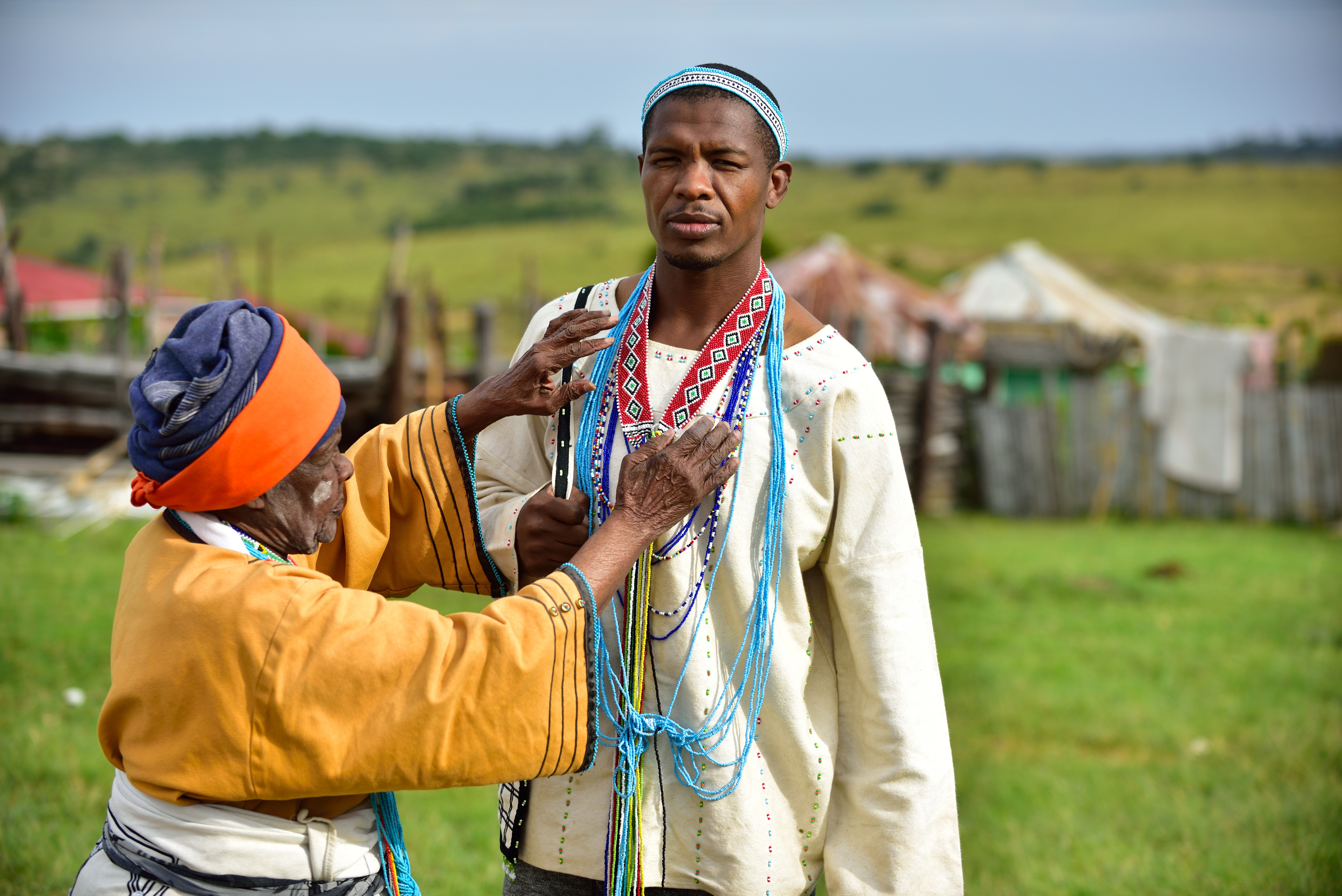
Xhosa man, Eastern Cape.

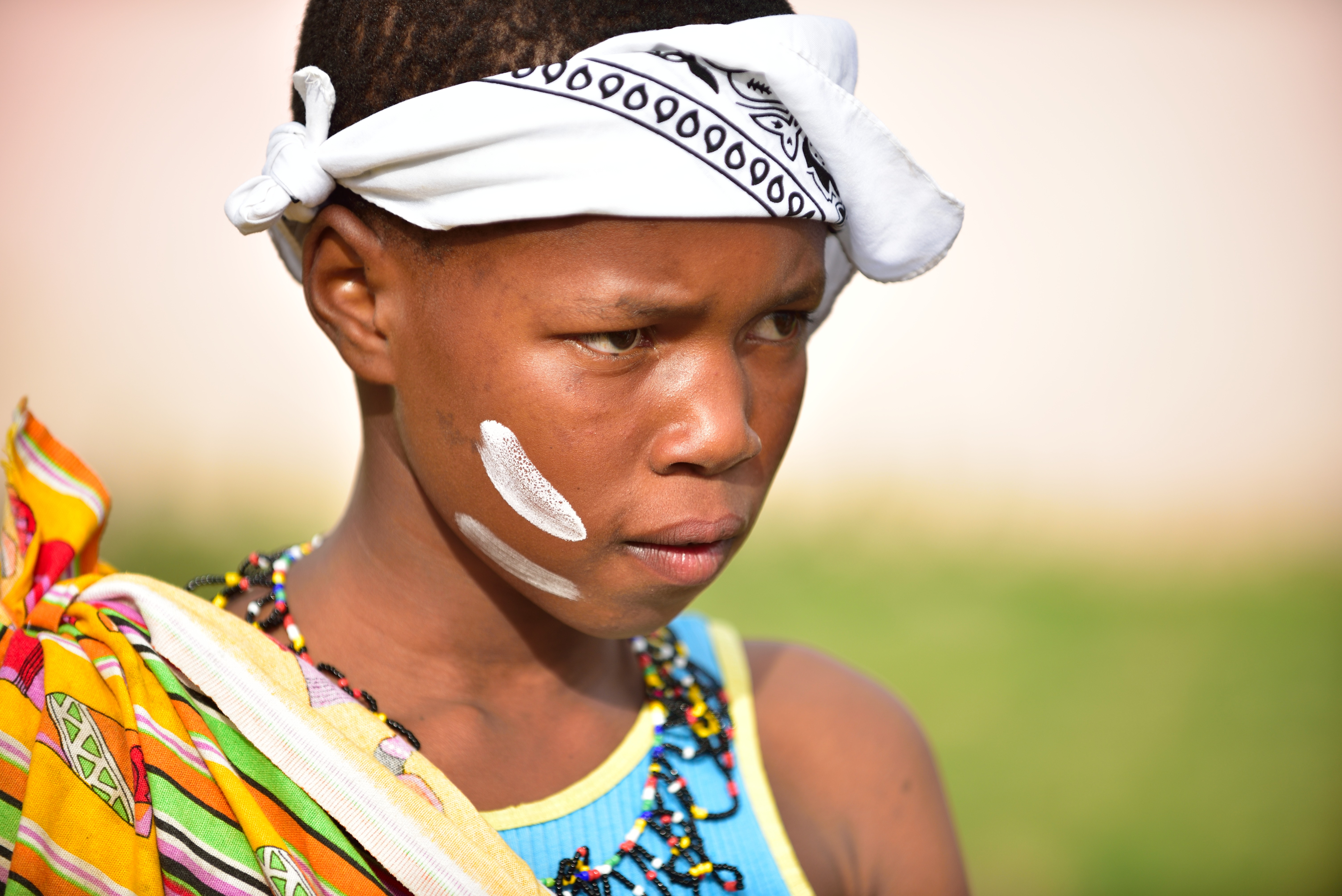
Xhosa girl.

Xhosa people as of 2011 made up approximately 18% of the South African population. The Xhosa are the second largest cultural group in South Africa, after the Zulu people.

Under apartheid, adult literacy rates were as low as 30%, and in 1996 studies estimated the literacy level of first-language Xhosa speakers at approximately 50%. There have been advances since then, however.

Education in primary-schools serving Xhosa-speaking communities is conducted in Xhosa, but this is replaced by English after the early primary grades. Xhosa is still considered as a studied subject, however, and it is possible to major in Xhosa at university level. Most of the students at Walter Sisulu University and University of Fort Hare speak Xhosa.

After the breakdown of apartheid, migration to Gauteng and Cape Town has become increasingly common, especially amongst rural Xhosa people.

== Notable Xhosa ==
- Nelson Mandela
- Thabo Mbeki
- Desmond Tutu
- Steve Biko
- Winnie Mandela
- Walter Sisulu
- Albertina Sisulu
- Govan Mbeki
- Oliver Reginald Tambo
- Miriam Makeba
- Siya Kolisi
- Raymond Mhlaba
- Zozibini Tunzi
- Qhawekazi Mazaleni
- Dali Mpofu

== See also ==
- List of Xhosa Kings
- List of Xhosa Chiefs
- Xhosa wars
- Military history of South Africa
- African Great Lakes
- Nguni
- List of Xhosa people
- Inqawe
- Xhosa literature
- Xhosa language

== Bibliography ==
- "Results of the 2001 South African census". Archived from the original on 22 May 2005.

Note that the figure mentioned on this page is based upon the number of people speaking Xhosa as their home language, which may be greater or less than the total number of people claiming Xhosa descent. In addition, several million people in the Johannesburg-Soweto region speak Xhosa or Zulu as a second or third language. For a majority of these, the two languages become difficult to distinguish (unsurprising given the extreme closeness of their linguistic relationship).

- Reader, J., 1997. Africa: A Biography of the Continent, Vintage Books, New York, NY, United States of America.
- Kaschula, Russell The Heritage Library of African People: Xhosa, New York: The Rosen Publishing Group, Inc., 1997.
- Marquard, Jean (30 January 2009). "The "grosvenor" and its Literary Heritage". English Studies in Africa. 24 (2): 117–137. doi:10.1080/00138398108690786.
