= UThixo =

Xhosa term for diety

uThixo is a Xhosa word that means "God" or "The Almighty" in English. It is often used as a reference to the divine being in the context of the Christian faith in Xhosa-speaking communities in South Africa.

The term is often used to refer to the supreme deity in Christian theology. Xhosa people, part of the Nguni ethnic group in South Africa, have a rich cultural and linguistic heritage.

== Origin ==
Thixo is derived from Tsui'goab (Tsuni-‖Goam), the great hero of the Khoi from whom they are said to have taken their origin. The meaning of the name is usually given as "sore or wounded knee".

== Religion ==
In Xhosa cosmology, uThixo is seen as the creator of the universe and the ultimate source of all existence. The word is used in prayers, worship, and religious ceremonies within the Xhosa Christian community.

"uThixo" embodies the divine force that is acknowledged and revered in their traditional belief systems. The concept of "uThixo" reflects a deep connection to the spiritual realm and an understanding of the divine as a guiding and protective force in their lives.

== History ==
The concept of uThixo is deeply intertwined with the history of missionary activities and the spread of Christianity in the region. Missionaries translated biblical texts into Xhosa, incorporating the term uThixo to represent the Christian God.
