= Mthimkhulu II =

King of AmaHlubi
- Reign: 1801–1819
- Coronation: 1804
- Predecessor: Bhungane II
- Successor: Mpangazitha then Dlomo II, later On Langalibalele I
- Regent: Prince Mahwanqa
- Born: Prince Ngwadlazibomvu c. 1778; Nombamba, Mzinyathi,(Utrecht, KwaZulu-Natal)
- Died: 1819
- Issue: Prince Dlomo II, Prince Langalibalele I, Prince Ncwane, Prince Duba, Prince Luthuli, Prince Mhlambiso, Prince Luzipho, Prince Ludidi, Prince Magadla and many others
- House: Radebe
- Father: King Bhungane II
- Mother: Queen Ngiyiwe

Mthimkhulu II (Also known as *Ngwadlazibomvu*) was King of the AmaHlubi people, a Bantu Kingdom in South Africa. He succeeded his father King Bhungane II ("Bhungan'omakhulukhulu") in the year 1801 and thus becoming the King of AmaHlubi nation to rule in what is now known as KwaZulu-Natal (South Africa) as the Kingdom was established in South Africa in upper Thukela Northern KZN region.

King Mthimkhulu 2nd from the Hlubi language "umuthi" means "medicine" and "omkhulu" means "Great") hence "Mthimkhulu" means "Great Medicine Man"). He got this name because he had knowledge on kingship medicine and rainmaking of which neighboring Kingdoms consulted with him such as King Sobhuza I of Swazi and AmaNgwane kingdom leader. In modern day his name is widely misunderstood to mean "Great tree" (Nb: a tree is called "isihlahla" in the Hlubi language.

In 1818 King Dingiswayo of( AbaThethwa Kingdom) attacked and looted the AmaNgwane clan whom, to replenish their losses of cattle,than attacked the Hlubi people. King Mthimkhulu II united with his brother from another Hlubi branch Prince Mpangazitha (Pakalita) and died in the ensuing battle in the year 1819.King Mthimkhulu's full brother Prince Marhwanqa assumed the regency on behalf of his son the heir to the AmaHlubi throne Prince Dlomo III who was still a minor at the time. When King Dlomo II ascended to the throne, he gathered his own troops and marched to the Zulu boarder where his own country and the Zulus meet and crossed into What was than called KwaZulu state country to fetch his uncle’s cattle which were kept in safety by the AmaZulu King Dingane kaSenzangakhona for the regent Prince Marhwanqa in the midst of his troubles with King Dlomo III who himself was claiming his rightful position from his uncle. His reign was however short lived as Dingane (a Zulu King) ordered the murder of the new Hlubi king which gave way for Langalibalele I to become the All New king of AmaHlubi nation.
