= Hlubi people =

Nguni ethnic group of Southern Africa

Hlubi People AmaHlubi
AmaHlubi AmaNgelengele
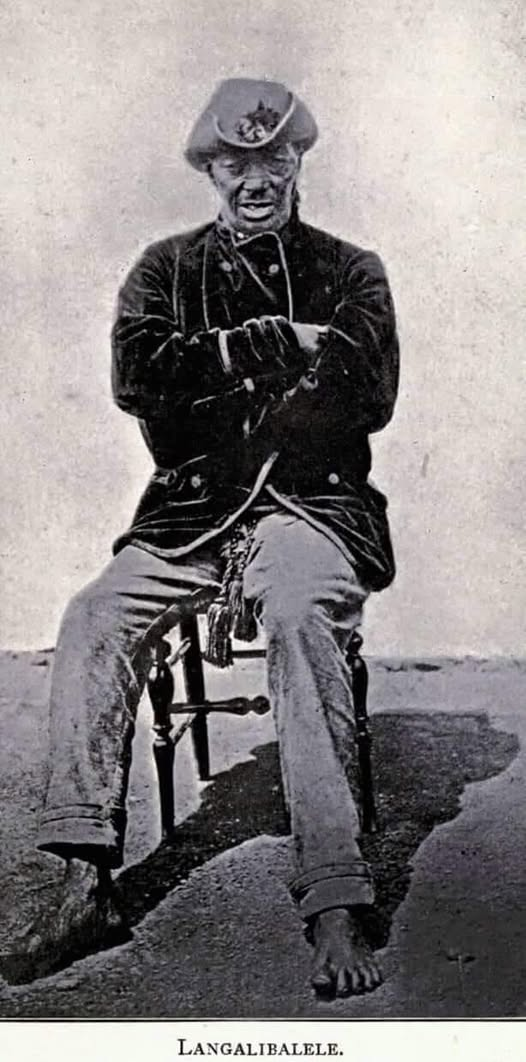

Total population
- +10 000 000 estimated 2025

Regions with significant populations
- South Africa, Lesotho, Swatini, Zimbabwe, Mozambique

Languages
- IsiHlubi (near Extinction); IsiXhosa, Sesotho, IsiZulu

Religion
- African Spirituality

Related ethnic groups
- Zulu, Swati, Southern Ndebele, Northern Ndebele, Ngwe, Bhaca and Phuthi

The AmaHlubi Nation
- Person: IHlubi
- People: AmaHlubi
- Language: IsiHlubi
- Country: EmaHlutjhini

The Hlubi people or AmaHlubi are an Embo Nguni ethnic group native to South Africa, with the majority of population found in Gauteng, Mpumalanga, KwaZulu-Natal and Eastern Cape provinces of South Africa.

== Language ==
The AmaHlubi speak a dialect closely related to the Swati language, one of the Tekela languages in the Nguni branch of the Bantu language family.

The Hlubi (AmaHlubi) dialect is endangered and most Hlubi speakers are elderly and illiterate. There are attempts by Hlubi intellectuals to revive the language and make it the thirteenth recognized language in South Africa. Amahlubi are also found in the Mashonaland West kwaZvimba region in Zimbabwe. There is a small community with the Radebe surname .

== See also ==
- Hlubi Kings
- Matiwane
