= Lala language (South Africa) =

Language spoken in South Africa

isiLala
- Lala
- isiLala
- Native to: South Africa
- Region: KwaZulu-Natal, lower South Coast
- Ethnicity: Lala people
- Native speakers: (unknown cited 1999)
- Language family: Niger–Congo?: Atlantic–Congo; Volta-Congo; Benue–Congo; Bantoid; Southern Bantoid; Bantu; Southern Bantu; Nguni; Tekela; isiLala

Language codes
- ISO 639-3: None (mis)
- Glottolog: lala1263
- Guthrie code: S.406

isiLala (also known simply as Lala) is a Tekela Nguni language of South Africa, spoken along the lower South Coast of KwaZulu-Natal. Although it has sometimes been classified as a dialect of Zulu for sociological and political reasons, it differs markedly from Zulu in phonology and, to a significant degree, in morphology. It is currently endangered, with speaker communities confirmed as recently as 1999.

== Classification ==
isiLala belongs to the Nguni subgroup of Southern Bantu languages. Within Nguni, it falls into the Tekela branch, which also includes Swati, Phuthi, Bhaca, Nhlangwini, and Northern Transvaal Ndebele. The Tekela branch is distinguished from the Zunda branch (which includes Zulu, Xhosa, and Zimbabwean Ndebele) by several regular phonological correspondences, most notably Tekela /t/ corresponding to Zunda /z/.

The language is classified under Guthrie code S.406 and Glottocode lala1263. It does not currently have an ISO 639-3 code.

Tekela–Zunda correspondences in isiLala
Gloss	isiLala (Tekela)	isiZulu (Zunda)
parent	u-tali	um-zali
tooth	li-tinyo	i-zinyo
call	-bit-	-biz-
stone	li-tfe	i-tshe
knee	li-dzolo	i-dolo

== Dialects ==
Zungu (1999) identifies two principal dialects of isiLala:

- North Lala — spoken in the northern coastal areas of KwaZulu-Natal. Characterised by the absence of alveolar lateral obstruents, with velar fricatives /x, ɣ/ appearing in their place.
- South Lala — spoken further south along the coast. Retains the full inventory of alveolar lateral obstruents (/ɬ, ɮ, tɬ, dɮ/), consistent with the broader Tekela profile.

Despite these phonological differences, Zungu concludes that the two varieties constitute a single language, unified by shared morphology, syntax, and core vocabulary.

== History ==
The history of isiLala is intertwined with the broader history of the Nguni people in southeastern Africa. The language has been subject to sustained pressure from isiZulu since the era of the Zulu expansion under Shaka, as well as from isiXhosa through Xhosa-medium schooling on the old Natal South Coast. For sociological and political reasons, isiLala has frequently been subsumed under Zulu, despite substantial linguistic divergence. The term "Lala" itself has been used variously to refer to an ethnic group, a geographical location, and a social class, complicating straightforward language–dialect mapping.

== Phonology ==
=== Vowels ===
isiLala has a five-vowel system, representing the merger of Proto-Bantu's seven-vowel system. This is identical to the vowel inventories of Zulu, Xhosa, and Swati:

	Front	Central	Back
Close	i		u
Mid	e		o
Open		a	

Vowel length is not phonemic.

=== Consonants ===
The consonant inventory of isiLala is typical of Tekela Nguni, with several distinctive features.

==== Stops and affricates ====
isiLala distinguishes voiceless unaspirated, voiceless aspirated, and voiced stops, as well as prenasalised counterparts. A hallmark of the Tekela branch is the presence of alveolar affricates /tʃ, dʒ/ (or /tsh, dz/) where Zunda languages have alveolar plosives /tʰ, d/. isiLala exclusively uses homorganic alveolar affricates, unlike some related Tekela languages (e.g. Phuthi) which also employ labiodentalised variants.

==== Lateral obstruents ====
The status of lateral obstruents in isiLala is complex and varies by dialect:

Phoneme	South Lala	North Lala	Gloss
/ɬ/	ɬala	xala	'sit'
/ɬ/	ɬanu	xanu	'five'
/ɮ/	ɮula	ɣula	'surpass'

Southern Lala retains the alveolar lateral fricatives and affricates (/ɬ, ɮ, tɬ, dɮ/), whereas Northern Lala has replaced these with velar fricatives /x, ɣ/.

==== Clicks ====
isiLala possesses a full inventory of click consonants — three click types (dental ǀ, alveolar !, lateral ǁ) with five accompaniments each (voiceless, voiced, aspirated, nasal, and prenasalised). This distinguishes it from Swati (which retains only one click type) and Northern Ndebele (which lacks clicks entirely).

Click type	Voiceless	Voiced	Aspirated	Nasal	Prenasalised
Dental ǀ	ǀ	ɡǀ	ǀh	nǀ	ŋǀɡ
Alveolar !	!	ɡ!	!h	n!	ŋ!ɡ
Lateral ǁ	ǁ	ɡǁ	ǁh	nǁ	ŋǁɡ

==== Palatalisation ====
Unlike all other Nguni languages, isiLala does not exhibit productive palatalization or velarization of labial consonants. Where Zulu shows palatalisation (e.g. Proto-Bantu *-bwa 'dog' > Zulu inja), isiLala preserves the labial: i-m-bwa 'dog'. This makes isiLala exceptional within the Nguni family.

=== Tone ===
As a typical Nguni language, isiLala is tonal, with a two-level system of High (H) and Low (L). Tone is both lexically and grammatically distinctive. Like other Nguni languages, isiLala exhibits high tone spreading to the antepenultimate syllable and possesses depressor consonants that lower the pitch of following vowels.

== Grammar ==
=== Noun classes ===
isiLala retains the full canonical Bantu noun class system. Nouns consist of an augment (pre-prefix), a noun class prefix, and a stem. Classes are paired for singular and plural:

Class	Prefix (Sg)	Prefix (Pl)	Typical semantics
1/2	umu-	aba-	Humans
1a/2a	u-	o-	Proper names, kinship
3/4	umu-	imi-	Trees, body parts, natural objects
5/6	i(li)-	ama-	Paired objects, liquids
7/8	isi-	izi-	Instruments, languages, abstract things
9/10	in-	izin-	Animals, common nouns
11/10	u(lu)-	izin-	Long, thin objects
14	ubu-	—	Abstract qualities, mass nouns
15	uku-	—	Infinitives

=== Concordial agreement ===
All modifiers (adjectives, demonstratives, possessives, relatives, quantifiers) and the verb must agree with the head noun through a system of concords. The subject concord (SC) and object concord (OC) are prefixed to the verb stem.

Class	Subject concord	Object concord
1	u-	-m-
2	ba-	-ba-
3	u-	-wu-
4	i-	-yi-
5	li-	-li-
6	a-	-wa-
7	si-	-si-
8	zi-	-zi-
9	i-	-yi-
10	zi-	-zi-
11	lu-	-lu-
14	bu-	-bu-
15	ku-	-ku-

=== Verbal morphology ===
The isiLala verb follows the canonical Bantu agglutinative template:

[NEG] – [SC] – [T/A] – [MOD] – [OC] – [VR] – [EXT] – [FV]

Where:

- SC = subject concord
- T/A = tense/aspect marker
- OC = object concord
- VR = verb root
- EXT = verbal extension(s)
- FV = final vowel

isiLala retains the full inventory of Proto-Bantu verbal extensions:

Extension	Form	Function
Applicative	-el-	Benefactive, directional
Causative	-is-	Cause to do
Reciprocal	-an-	Mutual action
Passive	-iw- / -w-	Patient subject
Neuter/Stative	-ek-	State, ability
Reversive	-ul-	Undo action

=== Tense, aspect, and mood ===
Category	Form	Example (reconstructed)	Gloss
Present (long)	SC + -ya- + VR	U-ya-hamba	'He/she is walking'
Present (short)	SC + VR	U-hamba	'He/she walks'
Perfective	SC + VR + -ile	U-hamb-ile	'He/she has walked'
Remote past	a- + SC + VR	W-a-hamba	'He/she went (long ago)'
Future	SC + -zo- + VR	U-zo-hamba	'He/she will go'
Subjunctive	SC + VR + -e	A-hamb-e	'Let him/her go'
Imperative	VR (bare)	Hamba!	'Go!'

=== Conjoint/disjoint alternation ===
Like all Nguni languages, isiLala exhibits the conjoint/disjoint alternation. The long present (with -ya-) is used when the verb appears at a phrase boundary (disjoint), while the short present is used when a complement follows within the same phonological phrase (conjoint).

=== Locative formation ===
As in other Nuclear Southern Bantu languages, prefixal locative classes have been lost. Locatives are formed with the suffix -ini (or variants -ni, -n):

*indlu* 'house' → *indlu-ini* 'in the house'

=== Diminutives ===
isiLala has lost the Proto-Bantu class 12/13 diminutive prefixes. Diminutives are formed productively with the suffix -ana:

*indlu* 'house' → *indlw-ana* 'small house'

== Vocabulary ==
isiLala shares the majority of its basic vocabulary with other Nguni languages, but with characteristic Tekela phonological reflexes. The lexicon also shows significant Xhosa influence due to historical schooling patterns, as well as Zulu influence from sustained contact.

English	isiLala	isiZulu	isiXhosa
fire	nilo	umlilo	umlilo
cattle	tiyomo	izinkomo	inkomo
water	madi	amanzi	amanzi
stone	litfe	itshe	ilitye
dog	i-m-bwa	inja	inja
person	umuntu	umuntu	umntu
tree	umuthi	umuthi	umthi
three	tshatshu	thathu	thathu
long	-dze	-de	-de
matter, case	indzaba	indaba	indaba

== Status ==
isiLala is currently endangered. It has no official status, no standardised orthography, and no presence in formal education or media. Speaker communities were confirmed as recently as 1999, but no comprehensive sociolinguistic survey has been conducted since then. The language is not listed in Ethnologue with speaker numbers, and it lacks an ISO 639-3 code.

For sociological reasons, isiLala has frequently been subsumed under Zulu, which has accelerated language shift. The imposition of isiZulu through the Shakan expansion, colonial education, and apartheid-era language policy eroded isiLala's institutional presence. Some sources have prematurely claimed the language extinct, though this is not supported by the most recent fieldwork.

== See also ==
- Nguni languages
- Tekela languages
- Zunda languages
- Zulu language
- Xhosa language
- Swati language
- Lala people

== Bibliography ==
- Doke, C.M. (1954). The Southern Bantu Languages. London: Oxford University Press.
- Gunnink, H. et al. (2022). "Divergence and contact in Southern Bantu language and dialect history". Journal of Language Contact, 13(1).
- Msimang, C.T. (1989). Some Phonological Aspects of the Tekela Nguni Dialects. MA thesis, University of South Africa.
- Van Dyk, P.R. (1960). 'n Studie van Lala: sy fonologie, morfologie en sintaksis. PhD thesis, Stellenbosch University.
- Wright, J. (2012). "A.T. Bryant and the 'Lala'". Journal of Southern African Studies, 38(2).
- Zungu, E.M. (1999). A comparative phonological and morphological analysis of the North and South Lala dialects of Tekela Nguni. PhD thesis, University of KwaZulu-Natal.
