= Zulu grammar =

Grammar of the Zulu language of Southern Africa

Zulu grammar is the way in which meanings are encoded into wordings in the Zulu language. Zulu grammar is typical for Bantu languages, bearing all the hallmarks of this language family. These include agglutinativity, a rich array of noun classes, extensive inflection for person (both subject and object), tense and aspect, and a subject–verb–object word order.

== Notation used in this article ==
Zulu orthography does not indicate vowel length or tone, but it can be important to note this in a description of grammar. The following diacritical marks are used throughout this article to indicate aspects that the standard orthography fails to:

- A macron (ā ē ī ō ū) indicates a long vowel,
- An acute accent (á é í ó ú ḿ ń) indicates a high tone,
- A circumflex accent (â ê î ô û) indicates a long vowel with falling tone,
- No accent indicates a short vowel with no (low) tone, or is written where tone is not relevant,
- A diaeresis below (m̤ n̤ w̤ y̤) indicates that they are of the depressor variety.

== Noun classes ==
The Zulu noun consists of two essential parts: the prefix and the stem. Nouns are grouped into noun classes based on the prefix they have, with each class having a number. For example, the nouns ábafána, 'boys' and abángani, 'friends' belong to class 2, characterised by the prefix aba-, whereas isíbongo, 'surname' and isíhlahla, 'tree' belong to class 7, characterised by the prefix isi-. The numbers are based on the classes reconstructed for Proto-Bantu, and have corresponding classes in the other Bantu languages. Therefore, classes that are missing in Zulu create a gap in the numbering, as is the case with the missing classes 12, 13 and 16, as well as those above 17.

The prefix occurs in two forms: the full form and the simple or short form. The full form includes an initial vowel, called the augment, while this vowel is dropped in the simple form. The two forms have different grammatical functions, as detailed below.

Zulu noun classes
Class	Full prefix	Simple prefix	Common semantic content	Example
1	um(u)- (Note: umu- is used before single-syllable stems, e.g. umúntu "person". um- is used elsewhere. Both variants have two syllables; um- is pronounced /um̩/, with a syllabic consonant.)	m(u)-	Human beings	umúntu, 'person'
2	aba-, abe- (Note: abe- occurs only in rare cases, e.g. in ábeSûthu, 'the Sothos' or)	ba-, be-	Regular plural of class 1	abántu, 'people'
1a	u-	–	Proper names, kinship terms, personifications	úbabá, '(my) father'
2a	ō-	bō-	Regular plural of class 1a	ṓbabá, '(my) fathers'
3	um(u)-	m(u)-	plant, body part, river	uḿlenze, 'leg'
4	imi-	mi-	Regular plural of class 3	imílenze, 'legs'
5	ī-, ili-	li-	Fruit, body part, ethnicity/race (member), loanwords	ī́qandá, 'egg'
6	ama-	ma-	Regular plural of class 5.	amáqandá, 'eggs'
7	isi-	si-	Object, body part, kind of person, custom/culture/language	isícebi, 'rich person'
8	izi-	zi-	Regular plural of class 7	izicêbi, 'rich people'
9	in- (Note: The final n of the prefix becomes m before b, f, p, v, and disappears altogether before m or n. For example, ínhlanzi, 'fish', ímâli, 'money', ímpilo, 'life'. If the noun or adjective stem begins with an aspirated or breathy voiced consonant, it becomes a plain consonant. For instance, khulu, 'big' gives isilwane esikhulu., 'big animal', but inhlanzi enkulu, 'big fish'.)	n-	Animal	înjá, 'dog'
10	izin-	zin-	Regular plural of class 9 and 11	ízinjá, 'dogs', izimpâphé, 'feathers'
11	ū-, ulu-	lu-	Long/thin object	ū́phaphé, 'feather'
14	ubu-	bu-	Abstract concept	ubúhlalú, 'bead(s)'
15	uku-	ku-	Infinitive	ukúkhanya, 'light'
17	uku-	ku-	Relics, locatives, unspecified class	úkúdlá, 'food / right hand side'

Every class is inherently singular or plural. Odd-numbered classes are singular, even-numbered classes are plural, with the exception of class 14 which is also singular in meaning. The plural of a noun is normally formed by switching it to the next higher class. Thus, the plural of class 1 umuntu, 'person' is class 2 abantu, 'people'. For class 11 nouns, the plural is class 10. Classes 14, 15 and 17 usually have no plural at all, but in rare instances class 6 is used to form a plural for these nouns.

The class of the noun determines the forms of other parts of speech such as verbs and adjectives. These other parts of speech receive their own prefix, matching in class with the noun, though the prefixes themselves are not quite the same:

- umfana omkhulu, 'big boy'
- isihlahla esikhulu, 'large tree'

In terms of meaning, groups of similar nouns tend to belong to similar noun classes. For example, names and surnames are only found in class 1a. Nouns for people, including agent nouns, are commonly in class 1, while animals are often in class 9. Abstract nouns are often in class 14, loanwords in classes 9 and 5, and infinitives of verbs and nouns derived from them in class 15. These are only guidelines and there are exceptions in every single class.

=== Tone of nouns ===
Every noun stem (without the prefix) has an inherent tone pattern, where each syllable is inherently high (H) or low (L). For example, the stem -ntu of the noun umúntu has the pattern L (a single low-toned syllable) while the stem -fúbá of the noun ísifûba has an underlying HH pattern (two high-toned syllables). There are several rules which act to modify the underlying tones to produce the final tone pattern that is actually used in speech. Thus, the spoken tones may differ quite strikingly from the underlying tones. This is already evident in the example of ísifûba, where an underlying HH pattern is actually pronounced as FL (falling-low).

The prefixes of nouns also have an inherent tone pattern, but this is the same for all nouns and noun classes. The simple prefix has a single L tone, except for class 9 where the simple prefix does not consist of any syllables. The full prefix has an underlying HL pattern (the simple prefix has L, the augment has H), but the single-syllable prefixes of class 5, 9 and 11 have only H. Again, the underlying pattern may be modified by one or more tone rules, as seen in ubúntu, where the underlying prefix is úbu- but surfaces as ubú-.

The following tone rules apply to nouns:

1. Prefix spread: If the penultimate (2nd last) syllable of the prefix is high-toned while the first syllable of the noun stem is low-toned, the high tone spreads rightward to the end of the prefix.
2. H-spread: The last high tone in a word, if it occurs before the antepenultimate (3rd last) syllable, will spread rightward to the antepenultimate syllable. If the stem contains no high tones, this rule may apply to a high tone in the prefix as well, causing it to spread onto the stem.
3. Phrase-final HH: Where the penultimate (2nd last) syllable is lengthened phrase-finally, if the last two syllables of a word are HH, then if...
  - both syllables belong to the stem, they become FL (falling-low).
  - the former belongs to a one-syllable prefix while the latter belongs to the stem, they become FH (falling-high).
4. Left deletion: In a sequence of high tones that resulted from the spreading rules, all but the last high tone are deleted and replaced by low tones. Any high tones in the stem immediately preceding the last high or falling tone are also deleted, even if they are inherent rather than the result of spreading.
5. Tone displacement: As described under Zulu phonology.
6. Tone dissimilation: Any remaining word-final HH pattern becomes HL.

These rules are ordered, so that for example the prefix-spread rule applies before the left deletion rule: even if the left deletion rule deletes a high tone from the first syllable of the stem, the prefix spread rule will still operate as though it were still present. Thus, the application of the prefix spread rule can reveal the underlying tone of the first stem syllable. Moreover, the final two syllables are generally not modified by any of the rules, so that the underlying tones are usually readily apparent there. An exception applies for HH in the last two syllables: either the phrase-final HH rule will convert them to FL, the left deletion rule will delete the first H, giving LH, or the tone dissimilation rule will convert it into HL.

Note that the combination of the spreading rules and the left deletion rule gives the impression of high tone "shifting" rightwards. However, chronologically, these are two separate processes, and some other Nguni languages (e.g. certain Xhosa dialects) have the spreading rules but not the deletion rule.

The following table shows examples of underlying tone patterns, and the surface patterns that result after application of the rules. The hyphen indicates the boundary between the prefix and the noun stem; the tones of the prefix are shown before the hyphen, those of the noun stem itself after it.

Tone pattern	Underlying form	Prefix spread	H-spread	Phrase-final HH	Left deletion	Tone displacement	Tone dissimilation
One syllable
L	úmu-ntu	úmú-ntu			umú-ntu		
L	ín-dlu						
H	úmu-thí						
H	ín-já			în-já ín-já			în-já ín-ja
Two syllables
LL	ísi-hlahla	ísí-hlahla			isí-hlahla		
LL	ín-doda						
LL	ízin-yoni	ízín-yoni			izín-yoni	izin-yôni izin-yóni	
LL	ízin-doda	ízín-doda			izín-doda		
HL	ísi-báya						
HL	ín-sízwa						
LH	ísi-kathí	ísí-kathí			isí-kathí		
LH	ízi-kathí	ízí-kathí			izí-kathí	izi-kâthí izi-káthí	izi-kâthí izi-káthi
LH	ín-komó						
HH	úm-fází			úm-fâzi úm-fází	úm-fâzi úm-fazí		
HH	ín-kósí			ín-kôsi ín-kósí	ín-kôsi ín-kosí		
Three syllables
LLL	ín-dodana		ín-dódana		in-dódana		
LLL	ízin-dodana	ízín-dodana	ízín-dódana		izin-dódana		
HLL	ín-yákatho						
LHL	ísi-kashána	ísí-kashána			isí-kashána		
LHL	ízi-kashána	ízí-kashána			izí-kashána	izi-káshána	
HHL	ísi-fázáne				ísi-fazáne		
LLH							
HLH							
LHH							
HHH	úm-sébénzí			úm-sébênzi úm-sébénzí	úm-sebênzi úm-sebenzí		
Four syllables
LLLL	ú-dokotela		ú-dókótela		u-dokótela		
HLLL							
LHLL							
HLHH	ín-góqokází			ín-góqokâzi ín-góqokází	ín-góqokâzi ín-góqokazí	ín-goqókâzi ín-goqókazí	
HHLL	úm-fázázana				úm-fazázana		
LHHH	ín-tombázáné			ín-tombázâne ín-tombázáné	ín-tombazâne ín-tombazané		
LHHH	ama-ntombázáné	ama-ntombázáné		ama-ntombázâne ama-ntombázáné	ama-ntombazâne ama-ntombazané	ama-ntómbazâne ama-ntómbazané	

These rules combined can often lead to ambiguity as to the underlying tones, especially with longer stems and with class 9 prefixes. For example, the surface-form ínhlamvukâzi could reflect HHLL or LHLL, where the falling tone would be the result of tone displacement, and the first high tone lost due to left deletion. But HHHH, LHHH or LLHH are also possible, with a falling-low final pattern due to phrase-final HH rather than tone displacement. Even HLLL would be possible, with H-spread followed by left deletion and tone displacement creating the falling tone. In this particular case, the noun is known to derive from ínhlâmvu, with a HH pattern, but that still leaves both HHLL and HHHH as possibilities.

=== Use of the full and simple forms ===
The full form, including the initial augment, is the default form of the noun. It is used in most circumstances, such as in the role of the subject or object of a verb. The simple form has more specific uses. These include:

- As a vocative, directly addressing someone or something.
  Babá, ngisîze!, 'Father, help me!'
- When the noun is preceded by a demonstrative.
  ló muntu, 'this person'
- When the noun is followed by the interrogative adjectives -phí "which?" or -ní "what kind of?".
  muntu muphí?, 'which person?'
  muntu muní?, 'what kind of person?'
- With the particle sa- "like".
- After a negative verb, when the meaning is indefinite, i.e. translatable with a word such as "any".
  Angibóni bantu, 'I don't see any people', contrasting with Angibóni abántu, 'I don't see the people'.
- When the negative of the so-called "associative copulative" is formed.
  Angin̤anjá, 'I don't have any dog', contrasting with Ngin̤ênjá, 'I have a dog', in which the e reflects the combination of the final a of the copulative and the noun's augment i.
- In a negative sentence, with an indefinite possessive modifying the object.
- In a relative clause, when the relative concord is prefixed to a possessive form, i.e. with "whose" as a relative.
- In a phrase which acts as a synonym of a preceding pronoun.
  Thiná, bantu,..., 'We, the people,...'

=== Locative ===
The locative is a noun form that indicates a location associated with the noun. It can translate to a variety of English prepositions, such as "in", "at", "on", "to" or "from", and is thus quite general in meaning. The locative is formed in two different ways, depending on the class of the noun.

For nouns in class 1(a) or 2(a), which include all proper names of people, the locative is formed by prefixing kú- to the noun, dropping the augment. The prefix has a high tone like the augment, so the tone pattern of the word does not change. For example:

- umúntu, 'person' → kumúntu, 'at/on/to/from etc. the person'
- abántu, 'people' → kubántu, 'at/on/to/from etc. the people'
- úbabá, 'father' → kúbabá, 'at/on/to/from etc. father'
- ṓbabá, 'fathers' → kṓbabá, 'at/on/to/from etc. fathers' (u + o gives o)
- u-Okthoba, 'October' → ku-Okthoba, 'in October'

For nouns that are not in class 1 or 2, the locative is formed by replacing the augment of the noun with e-, or with o- with class 11 nouns. For most nouns -ini is also suffixed, which causes various changes to the final vowel of the stem. The additional stem syllable also changes the tone pattern.

- a + ini → eni
- e + ini → eni
- i + ini → ini
- o + ini → weni
- u + ini → wini

Some examples:

- uḿlenze, 'leg' → emlénzeni, 'on the leg'
- îsó, 'eye' → êswéni, 'in the eye'
- ámánzi, 'water' → émánzini, 'in the water'
- índlebé, 'ear' → éndlebéni, 'in the ear'
- ínkungú, 'fog' → énkungwíni, 'in the fog'
- ū́phahla, 'roof' → ōpháhleni, 'on the roof'

Some nouns have locative forms without the suffix, using just the prefix. This includes most nouns for place names, but also a few regular nouns:

- îGóli, 'Johannesburg' → êGóli, 'in Johannesburg'
- îndlé, 'the wild' → êndlé, 'in the wild'
- îkhânda, 'head' → êkhânda, 'on the head'
- îkhâya, 'home' → êkhâya, 'at home'
- úbusûku, 'night' → ébusûku, 'at night'
- ínyákatho, 'north' → ényákatho, 'in the north'

=== Possessive ===
The possessive form is similar to the genitive case of some other languages. It indicates the possessor, or a more general association, and corresponds in meaning to the English preposition "of". It is placed after the noun that is possessed, and receives a special possessive prefix that agrees with the preceding noun's class. For example:

- ū́phahla lwéndlu, 'the roof of the house'
- ámasôndo êbhási, 'the wheels of the bus'
- úkushísa kwoḿlilo, 'the heat of the fire'

The possessive prefix is formed from the subject concord of verbs (see the verbs section), plus á. When the possessive prefix is attached to a noun of class 1a (the possessor is class 1a, not the thing possessed), an additional k is infixed, and the subject concord is dropped altogether when it consists of only a vowel.

Zulu possessive prefixes
Class	Prefix	Prefix + class 1a
1, 1a	wá-	ká-
2, 2a	bá-	baká-
3	wá-	ká-
4	yá-	ká-
5	lá-	liká-
6	á-	ká-
7	sá-	siká-
8	zá-	ziká-
9	yá-	ká-
10	zá-	ziká-
11	lwá-	luká-
14	bá-	buká-
15	kwá-	kuká-
17	kwá-	kuká-

The vowel of the prefix coalesces with any initial vowel of the noun, as follows:

- a + a → a
- a + e → e
- a + i → e
- a + o → o
- a + u → o

For instance: Isilwane sethu, 'Our animal': formed by sá- (possessive prefix of the class 7 noun isilwane, 'animal') and -íthú (possessive stem of the first person plural personal pronoun).

With nouns not in class 1a, the possessive prefix can be attached to either the full form or the simple form of the noun. When attached to the simple form, it has an indefinite meaning, like "of any", used with negative verbs. The full form is used in other cases. For example:

- angidlánga úkudlá kwênjá, 'I didn't eat the food of the dog' / 'I didn't eat the dog's food'
- angidlánga úkudlá kwânjá, 'I didn't eat the food of any dog' / 'I didn't eat any dog's food'

With nouns in class 1a, the prefix, extended with ka, is always attached to the simple form.

The possessive form can be extended into a substantive form. It is created by prefixing á-, é- or ó- to the possessive, depending on the noun prefix of the possessed's class: a is used when the possessed noun's prefix begins with a, e when it begins with i, o when it begins with u. In class 6, áw- is prefixed.

- índlu yómzingéli, 'the hunter's house' → éyómzingéli, 'the hunter's (one)'
- īkhompyutha likábabá, 'father's computer' → élikábabá, 'father's (one)'

=== Copulative ===
The copulative form of a noun expresses identity, and has a meaning similar to the English copula be. However, it is a noun form rather than a verb, so no verb is needed, at least in the present tense. The copulative is formed by prefixing the so-called "identifying prefix", which takes three different forms:

- ng- if the noun begins with a, e, o or u
- y̤- if the noun begins with i
- w̤- for class 11 nouns

By itself, the copulative form means "it is" or "it is a/the", such as:

- ngumama, 'it's my mother, it's a/the mother'
- y̤intómbazâne, 'it's a girl'
- w̤ūphâhla lwéndlu, 'it's the roof of the house'

When a noun is equated with something else, the copulative is prefixed with a subject concord (see the verbs section) that matches the subject that the noun is equated with. The subject may or may not be explicitly stated, as usual for verbs. Thus:

- ínja iy̤isílwane, 'a dog is an animal'
- īkati liy̤isílwane, 'a cat is an animal'
- nginguḿfâzi, 'I am a woman'
- unguḿngani kamama, 'he/she is my mother's friend'

However, when the two things being equated have the same noun class, the subject concord is left out:

- umúntu ngumúntu ngabántu, 'a person is a person through (other) people'

The substantive possessive forms of a noun also have a copulative of their own. They are formed and used in the same way as for the base noun, and always use the prefix ng-.

- y̤índlu yómzingéli, 'it's the hunter's house' → ngéyómzingéli, 'it's the hunter's (one)'
- y̤īkhompyutha kábabá, 'it's father's computer' → ngelíkábabá, 'it's father's (one)'

To express the negative of the copula, corresponding to English "is not" and similar, the prefix a- is added to the subject concord of the existing copulative. The subject concord must therefore always be present; the prefix cannot be added to the bare copulative.

- angiy̤isílwane, 'I am not an animal'
- awunguḿngani wámi, 'he/she is not my friend'

== Pronouns ==
Pronouns behave in many ways like nouns, having locative, possessive and copulative forms. They differ, however, in that they have one form for each possible class they can refer to.

The locative form of pronouns is formed like it is for class 1 or 2 nouns, using the prefix ku- and no suffix. The possessive forms are the same as for nouns. The copulative form always uses the identifying prefix yi-.

=== Personal pronouns ===
Personal pronouns occur in two forms: an independent form, which is used as a word alone, and a combining stem, which is used whenever a prefix is added. The independent form consists of the combining stem with na added at the end. Some pronouns also have a separate possessive stem, which is the combining stem that is used when a possessive prefix is added.

Zulu personal pronouns
Class	Independent	Combining stem	Possessive stem
1st sing.	miná	-mi	
2nd sing.	wená	-we	-kho
1st plur.	thiná	-thi	-íthú
2nd plur.	niná	-ni	-ínú
1, 1a	yená	-ye	-khé
2, 2a	boná	-bo	-bó
3	woná	-wo	-wó
4	yoná	-yo	-yó
5	loná	-lo	-ló
6	woná	-wo	-wó
7	soná	-so	-só
8	zoná	-zo	-zó
9	yoná	-yo	-yó
10	zoná	-zo	-zó
11	loná	-lo	-ló
14	boná	-bo	-bó
15	khoná	-kho	-khó
17	khoná	-kho	-khó

The forms mina, wena, thina and nina mean "I", "you" (singular), "we" and "you" (plural) respectively. The class 1 and 2 forms are used as third-person pronouns, with yena meaning "he" or "she" and bona meaning "they". All class forms, including classes 1 and 2, mean "it" or "they" when referring to a thing of a particular class. For example, yona can refer to inja (class 9), while wona can refer to amanzi (class 6). The class 17 pronoun khona serves as a neutral pronoun, indifferent to class.

Note that outside of the first- and second-person singular, the possessive stem has an underlying high tone. Since the possessive prefix also has an underlying high tone, the combined high-high tone surfaces as a falling-low pattern, just like in nouns of the HH tone class. In the first- and second-person singular, only the possessive prefix is high-toned, so the resulting surface pattern is simply high-low.

Zulu is a pro-drop language. As the verb already includes prefixes to indicate the subject and object, personal pronouns are not strictly needed, and are mostly used for emphasis.

=== Demonstrative pronouns ===
The demonstrative pronouns in Zulu occur in three types:

- Proximal ("this"), referring to something near the speaker. It is formed by prefixing the relative concord with l.
- Distal ("that"), referring to something not near the speaker. It is formed by replacing the final vowel of the proximal demonstrative with o (with an additional consonant (semi-vowels w or y) inserted for single-syllable forms).
- Remote ("yonder"), referring to something far from both speaker and listener, but within sight. It is formed by suffixing yā or yana to the proximal demonstrative (after changing the final -o of the Distal form to -a).

There is one pronoun for each noun class that may be pointed to. As with the personal pronouns, class 17 is a neutral class.

Zulu demonstrative pronouns
Class	Proximal	Distal	Remote
1, 1a	ló, lóna	lówo	lowayā́, lowayána
2, 2a	lába	lábo	labayā́, labayána
3	ló, lóna	lówo	lowayā́, lowayána
4	lé, léna	léyo	leyayā́, leyayána
5	léli	lélo	leliyā́, leliyána
6	lá, lána	láwo	lawayā́, lawayána
7	lési	léso	lesiyā́, lesiyána
8	lézi	lézo	leziyā́, leziyána
9	lé, léna	léyo	lēyā́, lēyána
10	lézi	lézo	leziyā́, leziyána
11	lólu	lólo	loluyā́, loluyána
14	lóbu	lóbo	lobuyā́, lobuyána
15	lókhu	lókho	lokhuyā́, lokhuyána
17	lókhu	lókho	lokhuyā́, lokhuyána

The longer forms are used especially when the demonstrative stands alone at the end of a sentence. The single-syllable forms lá, lé and ló remain stressed on the final syllable when prefixes are attached. The remote demonstratives in -yā́ likewise have final stress. For classes 4, and 9 the Remote form is usually shortened to the less cumbersome leya as shown for class 9 in the above table.

The demonstratives may stand alone, as true pronouns, but may also be used in combination with a noun, much like "this" and "that" in English. The demonstrative may either precede or follow a noun. If it precedes, the noun appears in the simple form, while if it follows, the noun is in the full form.

== Adjectives ==
The term "adjective", as applied to Zulu and most other Bantu languages, usually applies only to a rather restricted set of words. However, in the wider sense, it can refer to any word that modifies a noun. The wider sense is used here. Adjectives in the stricter Bantu sense are referred to as "true adjectives" in this article.

All adjectives have one thing in common: they all follow the noun they modify, and require some kind of prefix whose class matches the preceding noun. The different types of adjectives reflect the different prefixes that are used:

- "True" adjectives are prefixed with the adjective concord.
- Relatives are prefixed with the relative concord.
- Enumeratives use the enumerative concord.

Adjectives have the same tone classes that nouns do.

=== True adjectives (iziphawulo) ===
As mentioned, adjectives in the restricted sense are rather rare in Zulu, with only about two dozen existing. They form a closed class; no new adjectives are created.

Zulu true adjectives
isiphawulo (adjective (suffix))	meaning
-de	tall, long, high
-fishane	short
-ncane	small, few, young
-khulu	big, large
-bi	ugly, bad, evil
-hle	beautiful, good
-sha	new, young
-dala	old
-ningi	many
-bili	two
-thathu	three
-ne	four
-hlanu	five
-ngaki	how many?

There is one set of adjective concords: the regular adjective concord, and a shortened version of it.

The adjective concord can be seen as being formed by prefixing a to the full noun prefix, subject to vowel coalescence with the initial vowel of the noun prefix. Class 8's AC defaults to an additional n that is not present in nouns. The first- and second-person forms are created analogically, by duplicating the vowel in the subject concord and then prefixing a.

When adjective is used predicatively, the first vowel is dropped from the adjective concord. Forms for the first and second person exist as well. These are formed by prefixing the corresponding subject concords (see the verbs section) to the simple noun prefixes of classes 1 (singular) and 2 (plural).

Class	Regular	Copulative
1st sing.	engim(u)-	ngim(u)-
2nd sing.	om(u)-	um(u)-
1st plur.	esiba-	siba-
2nd plur.	eniba-	niba-
1, 1a	om(u)-	m(u)-
2, 2a	aba-	ba-
3	om(u)-	m(u)-
4	emi-	mi-
5	eli-	li-
6	ama-	ma-
7	esi-	si-
8	ezin-	zin-
9	en-	in-
10	ezin-	zin-
11	olu-	lu-
14	obu-	bu-
15	oku-	ku-
17	oku-	ku-

Examples:

- Abantu abaningi, 'many people'
- Abantu baningi, 'the people are many'

That is: abantu is in noun class 2, so it's adjectival concord is aba-, which is attached to -ningi to form abaningi. For 'many dogs' then it results in izinja eziningi, from izinja, 'dogs' (noun class 10) and ezin- (the adjectival concord for noun class 10) + -ningi, 'many', plus phonological conditioning to remove the double n.

- Umuntu omdala, 'the old person'
- Umuntu mdala, 'the person is old'
- Umuntu omude, 'the tall person'
- Umuntu mude, 'the person is tall'

Note that -dala goes with om- and -de with omu- because the long form of the prefix/concord is used when the stem is monosyllabic, else the short one is used.

Another example for a class 9 noun with adjectival concord en-:

- Inja enhle, 'the good dog'
- Inja nhle, 'the dog is good'

=== Relatives ===
Relatives are an open class, and most English adjectives will have a corresponding relative in Zulu.

Like the true adjectives, relatives have two concords, a regular concord and a shorter copulative concord. They are formed exactly parallel, with one key difference: for relatives, the subject concord is used as the base rather than the noun prefix. The regular relative concord is then formed by prefixing a copy of the subject concord's vowel, preceded by a.

Class	Regular	Copulative
1st sing.	engi-	ngi-
2nd sing.	o-	u-
1st plur.	esi-	si-
2nd plur.	eni-	ni-
1, 1a	o-	u-
2, 2a	aba-	ba-
3	o-	u-
4	e-	i-
5	eli-	li-
6	a-	a-
7	esi-	si-
8	ezi-	zi-
9	e-	i-
10	ezi-	zi-
11	olu-	lu-
14	obu-	bu-
15	oku-	ku-
17	oku-	ku-

== Verbs ==
Like nouns, verbs are formed by adding prefixes to a basic stem. However, the prefixes are not a fixed part of the verb, but indicate subject, object and various other nuances. Different stems and prefixes are used to indicate different tenses and moods. Normally, verbs are cited in the stem of the principal present tense, which ends in -a, for example -wa "to fall", -dlá "to eat", -enza "to do, to make", -bôna "to see", -síza "to help", -sebénza "to work". A few verbs end in other vowels, namely -âzi "to know", -sho "to say", -thi "to say".

Prefixes are always attached in a fixed order; the object prefix always comes last, immediately before the verb stem, while the subject prefix comes before the object prefix. Certain tense, mood and polarity prefixes may intervene between the subject and object prefix, or be placed before the subject prefix. No prefix may come between the object prefix and the stem. For example, wālipheka "he/she cooked it" consists of a stem -pheka "to cook", preceded in reverse order by an object prefix li- (class 5), the remote past tense marker -ā-, and the subject prefix u- (he/she/class 1, which becomes w- when a vowel follows). The form angikuboni "I don't see you" consists of a stem -boni (the negative stem of -bona "to see"), prefixed by the object prefix ku- (second-person singular), the subject prefix ngi- (first-person singular), and the negative marker a-.

=== Subject and object concords ===
Both the subject and, when applicable, the object of the verb are indicated by prefixes or concords attached to the verb stem. Zulu is a pro-drop language: explicit personal pronouns are only used for emphasis, while in general the concords on the verb give enough information. When a noun is used as the subject or object, then the concord must match its class. To refer to someone in the third-person, without a noun, classes 1 and 2 are used. The subject concord must always be present, except in the infinitive and imperative forms. The object concord is always optional, even when an explicit object follows the verb.

Four different kinds of verbal concord exist. For the subject, there are the primary subject, secondary subject and participial subject concords. In addition, a separate set is used for the object. The four are essentially the same if not for tone, except in class 1.

- The primary subject concords (subj1) are used for the subject in all tenses of the positive indicative mood. They are underlyingly low-toned in the first and second person, and high-toned in the remainder.
- Secondary subject concords (subj2) are used for the subject on all verbs marked with negation and on verbs marked for the subjunctive mood. They are all underlyingly high-toned.
- The participial subject concords (subjP) are present whenever its verb is in participial form. This concord extant on participial verbs is used regardless of the verb's tense. They are identical to the secondary subject concords, except that any final a becomes e.
- The object concords (obj) are used for the object of the verb, and are only used for transitive verbs and can be used to mark specificity and/or definiteness. They are all underlyingly high-toned.

The letters in parentheses indicate additional letters that are added when the prefix is not at the start of the word, functioning to "save" the phonology from being violated or to avoid ambiguity.

Person/ Class	Primary subject (subj1)	Secondary subject (subj2)	Participial subject (subjP)	Object (obj)
1st sing.	ngi-	ngí-	ngí-	ngí-
2nd sing.	u-	(w)ú-	(w)ú-	kú-
1st plur.	si-	sí-	sí-	sí-
2nd plur.	ni-	ní-	ní-	ní-
1	ú-	(k)á-	(k)é-	ḿ-
2	bá-	bá-	bé-	bá-
3	ú-	(w)ú-	(w)ú-	wú-
4	í-	(y)í-	(y)í-	yí-
5	lí-	lí-	lí-	lí-
6	á-	(w)á-	(w)é-	wá-
7	sí-	sí-	sí-	sí-
8	zí-	zí-	zí-	zí-
9	í-	(y)í-	(y)í-	yí-
10	zí-	zí-	zí-	zí-
11	lú-	lú-	lú-	lú-
14	bú-	bú-	bú-	bú-
15	kú-	kú-	kú-	kú-
17	kú-	kú-	kú-	kú-
reflexive	—	—	—	zí-

Examples:

- Sihamba manje., 'We are going now.'
- Thina sihamba manje., 'We are going now.' (with emphasis)
- Ngiyambona., 'I see him/her.'
- Ngimbona yena., 'I see him/her.' (with emphasis)
- Ngimnika isipho., 'I give him/her a gift.'

The reflexive prefix only occurs as an object, and refers back to the subject of the sentence. It is equivalent to English forms like myself, yourself, himself and so on.

- ngiyazigeza, 'I wash myself'
- uyazibona, 'he sees himself'

=== Tenses and moods ===
The participial form is used, among others:

- to indicate simultaneity
- in subordinate clauses with certain conjunctions.
- with certain auxiliary verbs.

==== Infinitive ====
The infinitive is an action noun, and belongs to class 15, which is reserved specifically for infinitives. It is a noun in every respect, and therefore it has a simple form, locative, possessive and so on. It corresponds to the English to-infinitive or gerund.

Formation of the infinitive
Affirmative	úku[obj]...a
Negative	úkunga[obj]...i

With passive verbs ending in -(i)wa, the suffix -a is used in the negative instead of the normal -i.

Examples
Verb	Affirmative infinitive	Negative infinitive
-wa	ukúwa "to fall; falling"	ukúngawí "to not fall"
-dlá	úkudlá "to eat, eating"	ukúngadlí "to not eat"
-dlá	ukuyídla "to eat it" (class 4 or 9)	ukúngayîdli "to not eat it" (class 4 or 9)
-bôna	úkubôna "to see"	ukúngabôni "to not see"
-bôna	ukúngibôna "to see me"	ukúngangíbôni "to not see me"
-enza	ukwénza "to do"	ukúngenzí "to not do"
-osa	ukósa "to roast"	ukúngosí "to not roast"

The infinitive may also sometimes be a result noun or other noun associated with the verb. For example, while the infinitive ukudla in its regular meaning is "to eat", it also has the lexical meaning of "food". This differs per verb and is a lexical property of that particular infinitive form, and must therefore be learned for each one.

==== Imperative ====
The imperative is used to issue direct commands. It can occur either alone or with an object prefix.

Formation of the imperative
	Alone	With object
Singular	(yi)...a	[obj]...e
Plural	(yi)...ani	[obj]...eni

The plural form, with the suffix -ni, is used when addressing multiple people.

The prefix yi- is used when the verb stem has only one syllable. A shortened form y- is used when the stem begins with a vowel (regardless of number of syllables). Exceptionally, the verb -za "to come" uses the prefix wo- instead, thus woza, wozani etc.

Examples
Verb	Alone	With object
-dlá	Yidlá! Yidláni! "Eat!"	Yídle! Yidleni! "Eat it!" (class 4 or 9)
-enza	Yenzá! Yenzáni! "Do!"	Kwenze! Kwenzeni! "Do it!" (class 15 or 17)
-síza	Síza! Sizáni! "Help!"	Ngisize! Ngisizeni! "Help me!"

==== Present tense ====
The present tense is the default tense, used to indicate events in the present. It corresponds to the English simple present or continuous present.

Formation of the present tense
	Principal	Participial
Affirmative	[subj1](ya)[obj]...a	[subjP][obj]...a
Negative	a[subj2][obj]...i	[subjP]nga[obj]...i

The infix -ya- is used whenever the form has lengthening on the penultimate syllable, i.e. when it occurs finally in the sentence.

Examples
Verb	Example
-hámba	Uyahamba., 'He is going.'
-hámba	Uhamba ekuseni., 'He is going in the morning.'
-hámba	Akahambi., 'He is not going.'
-síza	Uyangisiza., 'He is helping me.'
-síza	Ungisiza namhlanje., 'He is helping me today.'
-síza	Akangisizi., 'He isn't helping me.'
-síza	Usiza uyise., 'He is helping his father.'
-khuluma	Ukhuluma edla., 'He talks while he eats.' / 'Eating, he talks.'
-bôna	Ngambona engasebenzi., 'I saw that he was not working.'

==== Past tense ====
There are two different past tenses in Zulu, the recent past (also called the perfect) and the remote past (or preterite). They both share the same negative forms, however. What is "recent" versus "remote" depends on the speaker. The remote past is used to indicate the distant past, the past preceding the recent past, and as a narrative past. In the colloquial language, the recent past is often preferred to the remote past.

Formation of the past tense
		Principal	Participial
Affirmative	Recent	[subj1][obj]...ile/ē	[subjP][obj]...ile/ē
Affirmative	Remote	[subj1]ā[obj]...a	[subjP]ā[obj]...a
Negative		a[subj2][obj]...anga	[subjP]nga[obj]...anga

The long form in -ile is found when the verb has a lengthened penultimate syllable (same as the present -ya-), otherwise the short form in -ē is used.

Examples
Verb	Example
-hámba	Sihambile. "We went."
-hámba	Sāhamba. "We went."
-hámba	Sihambē izolo. "We went yesterday."
-hámba	Asihambanga. "We did not go."
-bôna	Asimbonanga. "We have not seen/did not see him/her."

With verbs of certain endings, the recent past ending -ile is not used, and instead the vowels of the last two syllables of the stem are changed. There is no distinction between long and short forms (-ile vs -ē) in these verbs.

Ending in	Recent past ending
-ala, -ela	-ele
-ama, -ema	-eme
-ana, -ena	-ene
-asa, -esa	-ese
-wa (passive)	-iwe
-awa^{1}	-ewe

- ^{1} This is a unique case, namely the irregular passive -bulawa from -bulala.

==== Future tense ====
There are two different future tenses in Zulu, the immediate future and distant future. They are essentially identical in form, with z in the immediate future versus y in the remote future.

Formation of the future tense
		Principal	Participial
Affirmative	Immediate	[subj1]zo(ku)[obj]...a	[subjP]zo(ku)[obj]...a
Affirmative	Distant	[subj1]yo(ku)[obj]...a	[subjP]yo(ku)[obj]...a
Negative	Immediate	a[subj2]zu(ku)[obj]...a	[subjP]ngezu(ku)[obj]...a
Negative	Distant	a[subj2]yu(ku)[obj]...a	[subjP]ngeyu(ku)[obj]...a

Both originate as periphrastic forms, from the auxiliary verbs -za "to come" and -ya "to go" respectively, followed by an infinitive. These two have fused into one word in modern Zulu, but remnants of their former status as two distinct words remain in various respects. The following list shows the approximate way in which the contraction of the immediate future preceded, using the verb -síza "to help" as an example.

Origin of the immediate future
Affirmative	Negative	Contraction level
ngiza ukusiza	angizi ukusiza	1. Original periphrastic form.
ngizokusiza	angiziyukusiza	2. Two words fused into one.
	angizukusiza	3. Glide -y- deleted.
ngizosiza	angizusiza	4. -ku- infix of the infinitive deleted.
ngōsiza	angūsiza	5. -z-/-y- of the auxiliary deleted, contraction of subject prefix vowel.

Generally, the forms of contraction levels 4 or 5 are used. With monosyllabic verbs, or verbs beginning with vowels, contraction only proceeds to level 3 so that the -ku- remains. Note that in the most contracted form, the distinction between immediate and distant future entirely disappears.

Examples
Verb	Example
-za	Ngizokuza. Ngiyokuza. "I will come."
-za	Angizukuza. Angiyukuza. "I will not come."
-akha	Ngizokwakha. Ngiyokwakha. "I will build"
-akha	Angizukwakha. Angiyukwakha. "I will not build."
-síza	Ngizomsiza. Ngiyomsiza. "I will help him."
-síza	Angizokumsiza. Angiyokumsiza. "I will not help him."

==== Subjunctive ====
The subjunctive expresses hypothetical situations, wishes and requests. It is also used for consecutive action, and as a complement to certain auxiliary verbs and conjunctions. There are present and past subjunctive forms.

Formation of the subjunctive
	Present	Past
Affirmative	[subj2][obj]...e	[subj1]a[obj]...a
Negative	[subj2]nga[obj]...i	a[subj1]anga[obj]...a [subj1]anga[obj]...a a[subj1]a[obj]...a

Note that the affirmative past subjunctive is identical to the affirmative remote past, except that the infix -a- is short. In regular Zulu spelling, where vowel length is not marked, this distinction becomes invisible. The three alternative negative past forms are contracted to different degrees. The first form is the uncontracted form.

Examples
Verb	Example
-hámba	Ngamtshela ahambe. "I told him he should go."
-zama	Woza lapha uzame futhi! "Come here and try it again!"
-hleka	Umane ahleke. "He only laughs."
-gqoka, -hámba	Wāvuka wagqoka wahamba. "He woke up, dressed, and went out."
-bheka	Wābaleka wangabheka emuva. "He ran away and did not look back."

=== Stative verbs ===
A range of Zulu verbs indicate a change of state or a process, which tends towards some final goal (cf. inchoative verbs). From these, a special kind of verb called a stative verb can be formed, which describes being in the state of having completed that process, i.e. "to be (state)". Stative verbs often fulfill the function that an adjective has in English. For example, the English adjective hungry translates to -lambile "be hungry", a stative verb.

Formation of stative verbs
Affirmative	[subj1]...ile
Negative	a[subj1]...ile

Stative verbs are formed similarly to the recent past, but with a few differences: there is a separate negative form, there is no shorter form ending in -ē, and no participial form. However, like the recent past tense, a stative verb can be formed by changing the vowels of the last two vowels of the stem, depending on the ending of the verb.

A stative verb is not a fully functional verb, as it can only be inflected in the present tense and infinitive. To form the past and future tenses of stative verbs, the auxiliary -bē is used, either alone for the past tense, or with future tense inflections.

Examples
Base verb	Non-stative	Stative
-fá	Uyafa. "He is dying."	Ufile. "He is dead."
-lamba	Ngiyalamba. "I am becoming hungry."	Ngilambile. "I am hungry."
-búya	Siyabuya. "We are turning back."	Sibuyile. "We have returned."
-lála	Bayalala. "They sleep."	Balele. "They are asleep."
-lála	Balalile. "They slept."	Babē balele. "They were asleep."
-lála	Bazolala. "They will sleep."	Bazokubē balele. "They will be asleep."

=== Derived verbs ===
New verbs are readily created from simple verbs by attaching various suffixes to the stem, to get different shades of meaning. The following table lists these suffixes, and an example using the base verb -enza "to do, to make":

Type	Suffix	Example
Reciprocal: each other	-ana	-thandana "to love each other"
Neuter-passive: be -able	-eka	-fundeka "to be readable"
Applicative: for/on behalf of	-ela	-fundela "to read for"
Causative: cause/make	-isa	-fundisa "to teach”
Intensive: intense/quick action	-isisa	-fundisisa "to study/read well/quick"
Passive: be -ed	-(i)wa	-fundwa "to be read/studied"
Reduplication: repetitive, for a little bit, or it doesn’t happen easily	reduplicate the verb	-fundafunda “to study/read for a bit”

For reduplication, verb roots that are more than two syllables long only have the first two syllables reduplicated. For example, the word “cabanga” when reduplicated is “cabacabanga” and not “cabangacabanga.”

=== Imperfect Verbs ===
The imperfect functions similarly to that of English. It expresses continuous events, such as “I was walking.” There is no difference between perfect and imperfect aspects in the present tense.

For the past recent, refer to the below table:

Imperfect
Class	Subject prefix	Conjugation for “hámba”	English
1st sing.	béngí-	béngíhámba	I was walking
1st plur.	bésí-	bésíhámba	We were walking
2nd sing.	béwú-	béwúhámba	You were walking
2nd plur.	béní-	béníhámba	You (all) were walking
1	úbé-	úbéhámba	S/he was walking
2	bébé-	bébéhamba	They were walking
3	béwú-	béwúhámba	It was walking
4	béyí-	béyíhámba	They were walking
5	bélí-	bélíhámba	It was walking
6	ábé-	ábéhámba	They were walking
7	bésí-	bésíhámba	It was walking
8	bézí-	bézíhámba	They were walking
9	béyí-	béyíhámba	It was walking
10	bézí-	bézíhámba	They were walking
11	bélú-	bélúhâmba	It was walking
14	bébú-	bébúhámba	It was walking
15	békú-	békúhámba	It was walking
17	békú-	békúhámba	It was walking
