= Hlubi language =

Bantu language of South Africa

Hlubi
- Isihlubi
- Native to: South Africa
- Ethnicity: Hlubi people
- Language family: Niger–Congo?: Atlantic–Congo; Benue–Congo; Southern Bantoid; Bantu; Southern Bantu; Nguni; Tekela; Hlubi

Language codes
- ISO 639-3: –
- Guthrie code: S.403

IsiHlubi is a Bantu language of South Africa, traditionally considered a dialect of Swazi. It is spoken in South Africa, near where the Xhosa, Sotho, and Phuthi languages meet at the Orange River and the southern point of Lesotho. The scattered Hlubi people speak several languages, including Swazi, and the Hlubi dialect of Xhosa in the former Bantustan of Ciskei.
