= Imbrication =

Imbrication is the arrangement of planar bodies such that they stack in a consistent fashion - rather like a toppled run of dominoes.

- In roofing, imbrication is employed in the Imbrex and tegula system.
- Imbrication (sedimentology).
- Imbrication (linguistics), a morphophonological phenomenon
