= Augment (Bantu languages) =

The augment, also called the pre-prefix or just initial vowel, is a morpheme that is prefixed to the noun class prefix of nouns in certain Bantu languages.

== Shape ==
The augment originates in the Proto-Bantu pronominal prefix, which is usually identical to the subject prefix of verbs. In some contemporary languages, such as Masaba, this shape has remained more or less unaltered. In others, the augment has been reduced to a simple vowel, often the vowel of the following noun class prefix (e.g. in Zulu umu-, ama-), or a lowered variety (Luganda omu-). Where the noun class prefix normally has a low tone, the augment has a high tone.

The following table gives an overview of the shape of the augment in various languages:

	Masaba	Luganda	Zulu
Class 1	umu-	omu-	umu-
Class 2	baba-	aba-	aba-
Class 3	gumu-	omu-	umu-
Class 4	gimi-	emi-	imi-
Class 5	lisi-	eli-	i(li)-
Class 6	gama-	ama-	ama-
Class 7	kiki-	eki-	isi-
Class 8	bibi-	ebi-	izi-
Class 9	in-	en-	in-
Class 10	zin-	en-	izin-
Class 11	lulu-	olu-	u(lu)-
Class 12	kaka-	aka-	—
Class 13	—	otu-	—
Class 14	bubu-	obu-	ubu-
Class 15	kuku-	oku-	uku-

The Tekela Nguni languages have the augment only in some noun classes, but with a relatively predictable distribution:

- Swazi has the augment when the noun class prefix begins with a nasal consonant (class 1/3 umu-, 4 imi-, 6 ema-, 9 in-).
- Phuthi has the augment where the vowel of the noun class prefix is a (class 2 eba-, 6 ema-).
- Lala has an unusual distribution which depends on the structure of the noun stem itself:
  - In class 1 and 3, the augment is present when the noun has the shape CV (munu "person", but derived diminutive unwana).
  - In class 2, it is present with any noun beginning with a consonant (abanu "people", but boni "sinners").
  - In class 9, it is present on all nouns.

== Function ==
The augment appears to have neither only one function in the languages that have it or even the same function in all languages. In earlier works, it was often compared to a definite article, but its range of use is wider than that.

In Ganda, the augment may indicate definiteness, specificity or focus, but its presence or absence may also depend on syntactic factors. It is present in simple declarative sentences:

omulimi omunene omukaddomu {} agenda
farmer fat old one goes
One old, fat farmer is going.

But it is absent when a noun follows a negative verb:

tetulaba mulimi munene
{we don't see} farmer fat
We don't see a fat farmer.

In Zulu, the augment is normally present, but it is dropped in cases like the following:

- In vocatives.
- After demonstratives.
- After a negative verb, with an indefinite meaning ("any" as opposed to "the").
