= Fanagalo =

Zulu-based pidgin of South Africa

Fanakalo
- Creole Zulu
- Region: Southern Africa-All mining regions of South Africa
- Speakers: L1: none L2 speakers: 5,000 (2022)
- Language family: Nguni Creoleisation of Zulu
- Dialects: Chilapalapa; Zulu

Language codes
- ISO 639-3: fng
- Glottolog: fana1235
- Guthrie code: S40A
- Linguasphere: 99-AUT-fh

Fanagalo, or Fanakalo, is a vernacular or Creole based primarily on Zulu with input from English and a small amount of Afrikaans. It is used as a lingua franca, mainly in the gold, diamond, coal and copper mining industries in South Africa and to a lesser extent in the Democratic Republic of the Congo, Namibia, Zambia, and Zimbabwe. Although it is used as a second language only, the number of speakers was estimated as "several hundred thousand" in 1975. By the time independence came–or in the case of South Africa, universal suffrage–English had become sufficiently widely spoken and understood that it became the lingua franca, enabling different ethnic groups in the same country to communicate with each other, and Fanakalo use declined.

== Etymology ==
The name "Fanagalo" comes from strung-together Nguni forms fana-ga-lo meaning "like + of + that" and has the meaning "do it like this", reflecting its use as a language of instruction. Other spellings of the name include Fanagalo and Fanekolo. It is also known as Isikula, Lololo or Isilololo, Piki or Isipiki, and Silunguboi.

Like Turkish, Fanagalo is characterised by a certain amount of vowel harmony, wherein a vowel in a prefix is changed according to the subsequent vowel. In the Nguni tongues, the prefix Mu- or Ma- denotes the singular, while Bu- or Ba- signifies the plural – hence Muntu = a man; Bantu = men, particularly when applied to tribes, e.g. Ma-tabele. Similarly, the prefix Chi- or Si- indicates the language spoke by that tribe. e.g. men of the Lozi tribe are called Ba-rotse (spelling is not standardised), and they speak Si-lozi; Bembas speak Chiwemba; Tswanas live in Botswana, formerly called Bechuanaland.

Chi-lapa-lapa thus is the "language" derived from lapa = "there", with reduplication for emphasis.

== Bhrosha ==
Fanagalo is one of a number of African pidgin languages that developed during the colonial period to promote ease of communication in South Africa. It originated as a mining language spoken by miners from different linguistic backgrounds. However, it is uncertain as to how this pidgin language was developed in the first place, as there are multiple competing theories.

The most common theory is that Fanagalo was created as a result of men speaking different languages (coming from different cultural backgrounds throughout South Africa and its neighbouring states) that went to work in the mines during the late 19th century. Eventually, these languages combined and a new dialect was formed to break the language barrier among miners. Fanagalo had spread across the country and throughout Southern Africa. Therefore, Fanagalo was spoken as a "contact language" in the mines between people originating from different tribes in South Africa and from different countries in Southern Africa, and between foremen and workers. In addition to Indigenous Africans, Afrikaans and English-speaking settlers and European immigrants (such as those of Portuguese, Polish and German descent) contributed to the development of Fanagalo for communication in the mines. However, some researchers disagree with this theory as Fanagalo is predominately derived from Zulu (as borrowed words from other South African languages and languages of neighbouring states such as Mozambique and Zimbabwe are not common.) However, the pidgin language was and still is mostly spoken by miners from different tribes in South Africa and neighbouring states, which gives support to this theory.

Another theory (suggested by Adendorff and other researchers) is that Fanagalo came from the Colony of Natal as a way of communication between Black people who spoke Zulu and white people who spoke English and Afrikaans. This theory explains why the pidgin language is composed mostly of Zulu, Afrikaans and English. This would be the result of the arrival of the British settlers and Afrikaners in Natal in the early 19th century; during the late 1830s, Cape Afrikaners travelled to Natal (and subsequently founded the Boer republic of Natalia (1840–1843)) and immigrants from England landed a decade later. The development of the pidgin language in Natal is attributed to "the acute difficulties of communication". Fanagalo was also spoken with Indian labourers that were imported to Natal by the British rulers and it eventually became a way of communication between the Indians and the Zulus as well. It is worth noting, however, that it is not influenced by Indian dialects. Indeed, the Indian languages had no economic value for interactions with the English and the Zulus. Fanagalo was then taught in the gold mines when Zulu men migrated from Natal to the Witwatersrand to work in the mines and this became the predominant pidgin language throughout South Africa. Some researchers also disagree with this theory as well because it is difficult to explain how a pidgin language from Natal could suddenly transfer to the gold mines in Witwatersrand and the diamond mines in Kimberly. However, a large increasing migration of Zulu people from Natal to Transvaal province, Cape province, and the Orange Free State to work in the mines validates this theory as most mines in South Africa are located in areas dominated by the native Sotho and Tswana peoples, yet there are few words in Fanagalo derived from these two languages and from other Bantu languages from South Africa and its neighboring states.

Adendorff describes two variants of the language, Mine Fanagalo and Garden Fanagalo. The latter name refers to its use with servants in households. It was previously known as Kitchen Kaffir. Both Fanagalo and Kitchen Kaffir contributed to linguistic colonisation as Kitchen Kaffir was created to segregate the colonizers from the local communities and was used as a means to exercise control. The term kaffir was used as a derogatory term for Black people in South Africa and is now considered extremely offensive. It is derived from the Arab word kafir, meaning unbeliever.

Two factors kept Fanagalo from achieving status as a primary language: the segregation of Fanagalo to work-related domains of use and an absence of leisure uses. Secondly, women and children were not permitted to speak Fanagalo, meaning that family communication did not exist and there were little ways to expand the uses of the pidgin. In the mid-20th century in South Africa there were government-led efforts to promote and standardise Fanagalo as a universal second language, under the name of "Basic Bantu".

In contrast, mining companies in the early 21st century have attempted to phase out Fanagalo in favour of the pre-existing local languages. In addition, there was a conscious effort to promote the use of English in domains where Fanagalo was predominantly used as a means of control. Ravyse (2018) discusses Fanagalo's apparent resistance to opposing official policy in spite of its ongoing stigma as a language for the illiterate. Fanagalo has become intertwined with the culture of the mining industry, and its continuation seems to hinge on the ongoing favour of its speaking community rather than industry policy. Despite this decline in use, Fanagalo is still accepted as a part of mining culture and identity and is seen as a de facto policy and maintains its significance in its domain of use. The strong identity Fangalo speakers shared enabled homogeneity and therefore they were resistant to the inclusion of English and likely explains why the pidgin is still used today.

Aside from mining, Adendorff also suggests that Fanagalo has unfavourable and negative connotations for many South Africans. However, he raises the point that Fanagalo is sometimes used between white South Africans, particularly expatriates, as a signal of South African origin and a way of conveying solidarity in an informal manner. That role has of late largely been taken over by Afrikaans; even among English speaking South African expatriates. In the latter half of the 20th century, holiday makers from the Rhodesias frequently went on holiday to Lourenço Marques in Mozambique (now Maputo), where many people speak Portuguese – but most also spoke a form of Fanagalo.

There have been some small books, grammars, and dictionaries published about Fanagalo. Presumably, these were used more by white supervisors than by Bantu-speaking workers as most Black workers learned the language naturally at work and many were illiterate.

== Phonology ==
=== Consonants ===
According to the Dictionary and Phrase-Book of Fanagalo (Kitchen Kafir) by J.D. Bold, Fanagalo (as spoken in the early 1950s) had the following consonants. He remarks that there did not appear to be a consistent set of allophones (the allophones used varied according to the speaker's native language) and that some Zulu speakers substituted /l/ for /r/ and /k/ for /ɡ/.

		Labial	Dental/Alveolar		Post-alveolar	Velar	Glottal
		Labial	median	lateral	Post-alveolar	median	Glottal
Click	tenuis/ejective		ᵏǀʼ ⟨c⟩	ᵏǁʼ ⟨x⟩	ᵏǃʼ ⟨q⟩		
Plosive	voiceless	p	t			k	
Plosive	voiced	b	d			ɡ	
Plosive	ejective					kʼ ⟨kh⟩	
Affricate	voiceless		ts		tʃ ⟨tsh⟩		
Affricate	voiced				dʒ ⟨j⟩		
Fricative	voiceless	f	s	ɬ ⟨hl⟩	ʃ ⟨sh⟩	x ⟨gh⟩	h ⟨h⟩
Fricative	voiced	v	z				
Nasal	voiced	m	n			ŋ ⟨ng⟩	
Liquid	voiced		r	l			
Semivowel	voiced				j ⟨y⟩	w	

=== Vowels and syllabic consonants ===
Bold remarks that Fanagalo had five monophthongs, five diphthongs, and two syllabic consonants with no tone or length contrast: /a/, /e/, /i/, /o/, /u/, /ai/, /ei/, /au/, /oi/, /ou/, /m̩/, and /n̩/. The syllabic consonants occurred only at the beginning of words such as mlungu and nkosi which are derived from the Zulu words umlungu and inkosi.

== Grammar ==
Like English, Afrikaans, and the Nguni languages, Fanagalo uses a subject-verb-object word order. The language possesses a highly regular and analytical inflectional morphology with only a few inflectional affixes and a few grammatical exceptions.

=== Verbs ===
Most present tense (which double as infinitive) verbs in Fanagalo end in -a; other tenses are formed by removing -a and adding other affixes or words. The following table shows the inflection of the regular verb hamba, meaning "to go."

Grammatical Tense	English	Fanagalo
Present	I arrive.	Mina fika.
Past	I arrived.	Mina fikile.
Future	I will arrive.	Mina zo fika.
Present Progressive	I am arriving.	Mina fikwa.
Present Perfect	I have arrived.	Mina fikiwe.
Causative	I make others arrive.	Mina fikisa.
Future Perfect	I will have arrived.	Mina zo fikile.
Present Modal	I can arrive.	Mina yazi fika.
Past Modal	I could have arrived.	Mina yazi fikile.
Present Permissive	I may arrive.	Mina wena fika.
Possibility	I might arrive.	Mhlaumbe mina zo fika.
Desire	I want to arrive.	Mina funa fika.
Wish	I like to arrive.	Mina tanda fika.
Desire (Formal)	I would like to arrive.	Mina zo tanda fika.
Expectation	I should arrive.	Muhle mina fika.
Irrealis	I am about to arrive.	Mina zo fika konamanje.

Several irregular verbs, some of which end in -a and some of which do not, also exist in the language and do not follow these basic rules for conjugation. For example, the following verbs hamba (to go) and azi (to know) are conjugated in the following way. The remote past tense prefix nga- and the recent past tense prefix be- can be used only with verbs that do not end in -a along with some other verbs such as dula (to stay), cula (to sing), and lala (to sleep).

Grammatical Tense	English	Fanagalo
Present	I go.	Mina hamba.
Past	I went.	Mina hambile.
Remote Past	I went a long time ago.	Mina ngahamba.
Recent Past	I just went.	Mina behamba.
Future	I will go.	Mina zo hamba.
Present Progressive	I am going.	Mina hambwa.
Present Perfect	I have gone.	Mina hambiwe.
Causative	I drive away (cause to go).	Mina hambisa.
Future Perfect	I will have gone.	Mina zo hambile.
Present Modal	I can go.	Mina yazi hamba.
Past Modal	I could have gone.	Mina yazi hambile.
Present Permissive	I may go.	Mina wena hamba.
Possibility	I might go.	Mhlaumbe mina zo hamba.
Desire	I want to go.	Mina funa hamba.
Wish	I like to go.	Mina tanda hamba.
Desire (Formal)	I would like to go.	Mina zo tanda hamba.
Expectation	I should go.	Muhle mina hamba.
Irrealis	I am about to go.	Mina zo hamba konamanje.

Grammatical Tense	English	Fanagalo
Present	I know.	Mina azi.
Past	I knew.	Mina aziile.
Remote Past	I knew a long time ago.	Mina ngaazi.
Recent Past	I just knew.	Mina beazi.
Future	I will know.	Mina zo azi.
Present Progressive	I am knowing.	Mina aziwa.
Present Perfect	I have known.	Mina aziiwe.
Causative	I teach (cause to know).	Mina aziisa.
Future Perfect	I will have known.	Mina zo aziile.
Present Modal	I can know.	Mina yazi azi.
Past Modal	I could have known.	Mina yazi aziile.
Present Permissive	I may know.	Mina wena azi.
Possibility	I might know.	Mhlaumbe mina zo azi.
Desire	I want to know.	Mina funa azi.
Wish	I like to know.	Mina tanda azi.
Desire (Formal)	I would like to know.	Mina zo tanda azi.
Expectation	I should know.	Muhle mina azi.
Irrealis	I am about to know.	Mina zo azi konamanje.

=== Noun Pluralisation ===
Most inanimate nouns in Fanagalo are pluralised by adding ma- to the base form of the word, but words starting with i are pluralised by adding z- and words beginning with n are pluralised with zi-. For example, the plural of foshol (shovel) is mafoshol (shovels); the plural form of inyoni (bird) is zinyoni (birds) and the plural form of nkomo (cow) is zinkomo (cattle). Regular proper nouns referring to people and categories of people are pluralised by adding ba- to the base form of the word. For example, the plural form of the proper name Judah (spelled Juda) in Fanagalo would be BaJuda (Judahs).

Bold documents several irregular plurals in his guidebook to the language: Abelungu (white people) as the plural of Mlungu (white person), mehlo (eyes) as the plural form of iliso (eye), and befazi (women) as the plural form of mfazi (woman).

=== Interrogatives ===
Yes–no questions are formed by raising the tone in a declarative sentence with the same meaning similarly to Spanish or by adding the grammatical particle na at the end of the declarative sentence. Other questions are formed by adding wh-words to the beginning of sentences.

== Language features and variants ==
Mine Fanagalo in South Africa and Zimbabwe is based mostly on Zulu vocabulary (about 70%), with English (about 25%) and some words from Afrikaans (5%). It does not have the range of Zulu inflections, and it tends to follow English word order.

Adendorff describes Mine Fanagalo and Garden Fanagalo as being basically the same pidgin. He suggests that Garden Fanagalo should be seen as lying towards the English end of a continuum, and Mine Fanagalo closer to the Zulu end.

The variety in Zimbabwe (Rhodesia) is known as Chilapalapa and is influenced by Shona, while the variety in Zambia (Northern Rhodesia), called Cikabanga (pronounced, and sometimes spelt, Chikabanga), is influenced by Bemba.

Several key features differentiate Fanagalo from the Nguni languages (such as Zulu and Xhosa). Lo functions as both an article and a demonstrative, while only a demonstrative in Zulu. Lapha is used to mean "here", also meaning "there" when the first syllable is stressed, and is also used as a general preposition for location. (It works for anything such as "on", or "near", etc.) Zulu, on the other hand, uses only lapha to mean "here". Additionally, Fanagalo uses only free pronouns: mina, thina, wena, ena, meaning "I, we, you, he/she/it/they". Zulu uses only pronouns for emphasis, relying instead on verb agreement markers, much like Spanish.

Here are two examples (all letters are pronounced):-

Koki Lobin
Cock Robin

Zonke nyoni lapa moyo ena kala, ena kala
All birds of air, they cried, they cried
Ena izwile ena file lo nyoni Koki Lobin
They heard the death the bird Cock Robin
Ena izwile, ena file, ena izwile ena file Cocky Lobin.

Kubani ena bulalile Koki Lobin?
Who they killed Cock Robin
Mina kruma lo Sparrow
Me, said the sparrow
Na lo picannin bow and arrow kamina
With the little bow & arrow of mine
Mina bulalile Koki Lobin.
I killed Cock Robin

TANDAZO'
(The Lord's Prayer)

Baba ga tina, Wena kona pezulu,
Father of ours, You are above
Tina bonga lo Gama ga wena;
We thank (for) the name of you

Tina vuma lo mteto ga wena Lapa mhlaba, fana na pezulu.
Niga tina namuhla lo zinkwa yena izwasisa;
Give us today etc., etc...
Futi, yekelela masono gatina,
Loskati tina yekelela masono ga lomunye.
Hayi letisa tina lapa lo cala; Kodwa, sindisa tina ku lo bubi,
Ndaba Wena kona lo-mteto, lo mandla, na lo dumela, Zonkeskat. Amen.

== See also ==
- Pidgin
- Creole language
- Tsotsitaal
