= Phuthi people =

Southern African Ethnic Group

Phuthi people EbaPhuthi
Total population
- 80,000 estimated (2024)

Regions with significant populations
- Lesotho, South Africa, mostly in the Eastern Cape

Languages
- siPhuthi

Related ethnic groups
- Xhosa people, Swazi people, Sotho people, San people

The Phuthi People
- Person: BaPhuthi
- People: EbaPhuthi
- Language: SiPhuthi
- Country: BoPhuthini

The Phuthi people (ebaPhuthi or BaPhuthi) are a Bantu-speaking ethnic group that form part of the Basotho Kingdom. It is an ethnic group who live primarily the southern parts of Lesotho and the northern parts of the Eastern Cape.

== Language ==
SiPhuthi is not yet recognised, but an amendment to the Constitution of Lesotho is currently awaiting approval. If passed, siPhuthi would be together with English, Sesotho, and isiXhosa one of the four official languages of the Kingdom. In South Africa, siPhuthi is not among the eleven official languages but benefits from being protected under the Bill of Rights as one of the languages spoken by South African citizens. In Lesotho, the ebaPhuthi remain culturally, politically, and socio-economically dominated by the Basotho majority and with no Phuthi paramount chiefs, they still lack political recognition. By contrast, the ebaPhuthi in South Africa has officially recognised chiefs, and the current Murena Kutloano Letuka, with his praise name Vutshemalagabi (“burning flames”), is the 5th chief in succession.

== History ==
Phuthi people are the descendants of Swazi, Sotho, eastern San and Xhosa people who lived in the areas where these ethnicities met in the southern regions of modern-day Lesotho and the Eastern Cape and they speak their own language called SiPhuthi, which is a Nguni language based on Swazi but heavily influenced by Xhosa and Sotho.
