= Tonga language (Mozambique) =

Bantu language spoken in Mozambique

Tonga
- Tonga-Inhambane
- Gitonga
- Native to: Mozambique
- Native speakers: 330,000 (2017)
- Language family: Niger–Congo?: Atlantic–Congo; Benue–Congo; Bantoid; Bantu; Southern Bantu; Tonga

Language codes
- ISO 639-3: toh
- Glottolog: gito1238
- Guthrie code: S.62

The Tonga language of Mozambique, or Gitonga (spelled Guitonga in Portuguese) is a Bantu language spoken along the southern coast of the country. Often thought to be closest to Chopi to its south, the two languages have only a 44% lexical similarity.
