= Bhaca language =

Bantu language of South Africa

Bhaca
- Isibhaca
- Native to: South Africa
- Ethnicity: Bhaca people
- Native speakers: Estimated 500,000
- Language family: Niger–Congo?: Atlantic–Congo; Benue–Congo; Southern Bantoid; Bantu; Southern Bantu; Nguni; Tekela; Bhaca

Language codes
- ISO 639-3: None (mis)
- Glottolog: bhac1238
- Guthrie code: S.402

Bhaca, or IsiBhaca (Baca) is a Bantu language of South Africa. Traditionally considered a dialect of Swati, it is closer to Xhosa, Phuthi and Zulu. It is spoken southeast of Lesotho, where Sotho, Xhosa and Zulu meet, mainly around Mount Frere, Mzimkhulu, and to a lesser extent in Mount Ayliff, Matatiele, Harding, Bulwer, Underberg, Highflats, Umzinto, Umzumbe and Ixopo.

== Vocabulary ==
Months in IsiBhaca:

English	Bhaca
January	Ntlolanja
February	Ndzata
March	Mbasa
April	Mgudlulwa
May	Ntlangula
June	Ntulikati
July	Ncwaba
August	Mphandula
September	Mfumfu
October	Nzibandlela
November	Lweti
December	Ntsinga

Example: Bendicela undithsengele amahlokomiso nentusi na ukhamba.

Translation [Xhosa/Zulu/English]: Bendicela undithengele amaqanda nobisi xa uhamba: Bengicela ungithengela amaqanda nobisi ma uhamba: "Please buy me eggs and milk when you go out".

English	Bhaca
I will beat you	Nditak’shik’tsha
Please pass me another spoon, mine fell under the table	Bendicela undidlulisele olunye ukhezo, olwam luwele edasi kwetafile

COMPARISON OF ISIXHOSA AND ISIBHACA words

Xhosa	Bhaca
Intombazana	Inkatinyana
Ukuthetha	Ukubhobha
phi?	layi?
Ukubetha	Ukukshiksha

IsiBhaca employs 4 distinct features that separate it from isiXhosa and isiZulu which are: ukuthsefula; ukuyeyeta; ukutekela and ukujhijhita.

For (1) ukuthsefula, there is a sibilant used, e.g. th in standard Zunda Nguni becomes ths in isiBhaca and t becomes tf. (2) Ukuyeyeta employs the use of 'y' heavily, e.g. amanzi (water) in standard Nguni becomes amayiwa, ukusela/ukuphuza (to drink) becomes ukun'yathsa. (3) Ukutekela transforms the standard Nguni z into t and lastly; (4) ukujhijhita uses a voiced postalveolar, e.g. hojhwace (at sunset), ijhwabi (a foreskin), ukujhaca (to lose weight), etc. These are the structural and phonetic differences that isiBhaca has.
