= Southern Bantu languages =

Language family

Southern Bantu
- siNtu
- Geographic distribution: South Africa, Zimbabwe, Botswana, Mozambique, Lesotho, Eswatini
- Linguistic classification: Niger–Congo?: Atlantic–Congo; Volta-Congo; Benue–Congo; Bantoid; Southern Bantoid; Bantu; Southern Bantu
- Proto-language: Proto-Southern Bantu

Language codes
- Glottolog: sout3387

The Southern Bantu or siNtu languages are a large group of Bantu languages spoken in the region of southern Africa. They are nearly synonymous with Guthrie's Bantu zone S.

== History ==
Proto-Southern Bantu was first spoken some time during the 2nd millennium CE within the borderland between South Africa, Botswana, Zimbabwe, and Mozambique, where the different Southern Bantu subgroups meet.

== Languages ==
Language groups are followed by their code in the Guthrie classification.

- Southern Bantu languages
  - Chopi–Guitonga (S60)
    - Chopi
    - Guitonga
  - Nguni languages (S40)
    - Zunda
      - Xhosa
      - Zulu
      - Ndebele
        - Northern Ndebele (Zimbabwe Ndebele)
        - Southern Ndebele
    - Tekela
      - Swati
      - Phuthi
      - Sumayela Ndebele (Northern Transvaal Ndebele)
      - Lala
      - Bhaca
      - Hlubi
      - Nhlangwini
  - Sotho–Tswana (S30 + K20):
    - Tswana ("Western Sotho")
    - Kgalagadi
    - Sotho
      - Northern Sotho (Sepedi)
      - Southern Sotho (Sesotho)
      - Sepulana ("Eastern Sotho")
      - Lozi
  - Tswa–Ronga (S50):
    - Tsonga
    - Ronga
    - Tswa
  - Shona-Venda
    - Shona languages (S10):
      - Eastern Shona group
        - Ndau (S15)
      - Central Shona group
        - Korekore (S11) and Tawara
        - Zezuru (S12)
        - Manyika (S13) and Tewe
        - Karanga (S14)
      - Western Shona group
        - Kalanga (S16)
        - Nambya (S17)
    - Venda (S20)
