= Nhlangwini language =

Bantu language of South Africa

Nhlangwini
- Native to: South Africa
- Extinct: [data missing]
- Language family: Niger–Congo?: Atlantic–Congo; Benue–Congo; Southern Bantoid; Bantu; Southern Bantu; Nguni; Tekela; Nhlangwini

Language codes
- ISO 639-3: –
- Glottolog: nhla1239
- Guthrie code: S.405

Nhlangwini/Ntlangwini (Hlangwane) is a Bantu language of South Africa. It is located along the border between Xhosa and Zulu, but is more closely related to Swazi.

The Nhlangwini/Ntlangwini people are the largest Nguni ethnic group in KZN South Coast - Highflats, KwaZulu-Natal - Mzimkhulu and in parts of the Eastern Cape areas such as Matatiele (kwaMzongwana and Makhoba) Tsolo, Tsomo, Ngqamakhwe, Willowvale (kuGatyana) and Keiskammahoek (kuQoboqobo).

== Etymology ==
The name of the language is derived from a word meaning reedbuck (cf. INhlangu in Zulu, iNtlangu in Xhosa). The chief Nombewu, a father of a prominent chief, inkosi uFodo of Nhlangwini clan was a brave hunter with his son Fodo. The skin of inhlangu cannot be pierced by a spear. What the hunters did when trying to kill it was to aim at the position of the heart, and then press the spear so hard that the heart was interfered with without the spear penetrating through the skin. That is why Fodo was praised as: Umkhonto kawungeni ungena ngokucindetela. ("Spear that does not penetrate, it only penetrates on pressing hard".)

Fodo used to present Dingane with the hides of this animal. He, together with his people, were thus generally known as abantu benhlangu (people of the inhlangu animal, hence abaseNhlangwini.
