= Imbrication (linguistics) =

Morphophonological phenomenon

Imbrication is a phenomenon occurring in many Bantu languages in which morphemes interweave in certain morphophonological conditions.

For example, consider the Setswana verb stem -rek-a ("buy"). The passive voice is formed by adding the extension -w- to produce -rek-w-a. The perfect is formed by adding the morpheme -ile to produce -rek-ile. But when these are combined to produce the perfect form of the passive voice, the verb becomes -rek-il-w-e, with the perfect morpheme split into two pieces, rather than the expected *-rek-w-ile.

Hyman, using the Cibemba language as an example, proposes four main factors that determine the occurrence of imbrication:

- the size of the verb base
- the nature of the final C of the verb base
- the nature of the V preceding the final C of the verb base
- the identity of the last morpheme of the verb base
