= Phuthi language =

Language of South Africa

Phuthi
- Síphùthì or Siphuthi
- Pronunciation: [sípʰʊːtʰɪ]
- Native to: Lesotho, South Africa
- Ethnicity: Phuthi people
- Native speakers: (20,000 cited 1999)
- Language family: Niger–Congo?: Atlantic–Congo; Volta-Congo; Benue–Congo; Bantoid; Southern Bantoid; Bantu; Southern Bantu; Nguni; Tekela; Phuthi

Language codes
- ISO 639-3: –
- Glottolog: phut1246
- Guthrie code: S.404
- ELP: Siphuthi
- Linguasphere: 99-AUT-fc
- Phuthi is classified as Definitely Endangered by the UNESCO Atlas of the World's Languages in Danger

Phuthi (Síphùthì) is a Nguni Bantu language spoken in southern Lesotho and areas in South Africa adjacent to the same border. The closest substantial living relative of Phuthi is Swati (or Siswati), spoken in Eswatini and the Mpumalanga province of South Africa. Although there is no contemporary sociocultural or political contact, Phuthi is linguistically part of a historic dialect continuum with Swati. Phuthi is heavily influenced by the surrounding Sesotho and Xhosa languages, but retains a distinct core of lexicon and grammar not found in either Xhosa or Sesotho, and found only partly in Swati to the north.

The documentary origins of Phuthi can be traced to Bourquin (1927), but in other oblique references more than 100 years from the present. Until recently, the language has been very poorly documented with respect to its linguistic properties. The only significant earlier study (but with very uneven data, and limited coherent linguistic assumptions) is Godfrey Mzamane's 1949 article.

== Geography and demography ==
As of 1999 it has been estimated that around 20,000 people in South Africa and Lesotho use Phuthi as their home language, but the actual figures could be much higher. No census data on Phuthi-speakers is available from either South Africa or Lesotho. The language is certainly endangered.

Phuthi is spoken in dozens (perhaps many dozens) of scattered communities in the border areas between where the far northern Eastern Cape meets Lesotho: from Herschel northwards and eastwards, and in the Matatiele area of the northeastern Transkei; and throughout southern Lesotho, from Quthing in the southwest, through regions south and east of Mount Moorosi, to mountain villages west and north of Qacha (Qacha's Nek).

Within Phuthi, there are at least two dialect areas, based on linguistic criteria: Mpapa/Daliwe vs. all other areas. This taxonomy is based on a single (but very salient) phonological criterion (presence/absence of secondary labialisation). Mpapa and Daliwe (Sesotho Taleoe [taliwe]) are villages in southern Lesotho, southeast of Mount Moorosi, on the dust road leading to Tosing, then on to Mafura (itself a Phuthi-speaking village), and finally Mpapa/Daliwe. Other Phuthi-speaking areas (all given in Lesotho Sesotho orthography) include Makoloane [makolwani] and Mosuoe [musuwe], near Quthing, in south-western Lesotho; Seqoto [siǃɔtɔ] (Xhosa Zingxondo, Phuthi Sigxodo [siᶢǁɔdɔ]); Makoae [makwai] (Phuthi Magwayi) further to the east; and a number of villages north and west of Qacha's Nek. (Qacha is the main southeastern town in Lesotho, in the Qacha's Nek District). Phuthi-speaking diaspora (that is, heritage) areas include the far northern Transkei villages of Gcina [g/ina] (on the road to the Tele Bridge border post) and Mfingci [mfiᵑ/i] (across the Tele River, opposite Sigxodo, approximately).

== Political history ==
The most famous Phuthi leader in the historical record was the powerful chief, Moorosi (born in 1795). It seems that approximately the land south of the Orange River in present-day Lesotho was Phuthi-speaking during the time of the greatest historical figure in the history of the Basotho people, Moshoeshoe I – just seven years older than Moorosi—whose authority in the 1830s, however, was far from covering the present-day territory of Lesotho. Until 1820, there were only "a few isolated villages of Basotho, and a small clan of Baphut[h]i, over which Moshoeshoe exercised ill-defined sovereignty". Most Phuthis, with Moorosi, were far to the south of Thaba Bosiu, south of the Orange River, well out of Moshoeshoe's way.

Moorosi was to die in unclear circumstances on Mount Moorosi (Sesotho Thaba Moorosi) in 1879, after a protracted nine-month siege by the British, Boer and Basotho forces (including the military participation of the Cape Mounted Riflemen). This siege is often referred to as "Moorosi's Rebellion". The issue that triggered the siege was alleged livestock theft in the Herschel area. In the aftermath of the siege, Phuthi people dispersed widely over what is contemporary southern Lesotho and the northern Transkei region, to escape capture by the colonial powers. It is for this reason, it has been hypothesised, that Phuthi villages (including Mpapa, Daliwe, Hlaela, Mosifa and Mafura—all to the east of Mount Moorosi, in Lesotho) are typically found in such topographically mountainous regions, accessible only with great difficulty to outsiders).

After the siege of "Moorosi's rebellion", many Phuthi people were captured, and forced into building the bridge (now, the old bridge) at Aliwal North that crosses the Senqu (Orange River). Prior to 1879, it seems Moorosi had been regarded in some ways as a very threatening competitor to Chief Moshoeshoe I. Even though currently represented to a nominal extent in the Lesotho government in Maseru, subsequent to the 1879 uprising the Phuthi people essentially fade from modern Lesotho and Eastern Cape history.

== Classification ==
Phuthi is a Bantu language, clearly within the southeastern Zone S (cf. Guthrie 1967–1971). But within southern Africa Phuthi is viewed ambivalently as being either a Nguni or a Sotho–Tswana language, given the very high level of hybridity displayed in all subsystems of the grammar (lexicon, phonetics, phonology, morphology, syntax).

But Phuthi is genetically—along with Zulu, Hlubi, Xhosa, northern (sumayela) and southern Ndebele, and Swati—certainly a Nguni language. Thus, it should be numbered in the S.40 group within Zone S, following Guthrie's classification. Further, given the range of lexical, phonological and even low-level phonetic effects that appear to be shared almost exclusively with Swati, Phuthi can be classified uncontroversially as a Tekela Nguni language, that is, in the subset of Nguni that includes Swati, some versions of Southern Ndebele, and the Eastern Cape remnant languages, Bhaca and Hlubi.

The contemporary lexicon and morphology of Phuthi confirms the standard claim (e.g. Godfrey Mzamane 1949) that Phuthi displays very heavy contact and levelling effects from its long cohabitation with Sesotho (for a period perhaps in excess of three centuries). There is, for example, a very high level of 'lexical doublets' for many items, for many speakers, e.g. -ciga "think" (Nguni-source), and -nakana "think" (Sesotho-source). Phuthi noun class prefixes are nearly all of the shape CV- (that is, they follow the Sesotho consonant-vowel shape, not the general Nguni VCV- shape).

There are also regional effects: the Mpapa Phuthi dialect (the only one to retain labialised coronal stops) leans much more heavily towards Sesotho lexicon and morphology (and even phonology), whereas the Sigxodo dialect leans more towards Xhosa lexicon and morphology (and even phonology).

Ethnologue lists Phuthi as an alternative name for Swati, the national language of Swaziland. However, Phuthi is no longer coherently in any obvious sort of heteronomous dialect relationship to Swati (several hundred kilometres separate the two language territories; Phuthi-speakers appear to have no conscious awareness of any relationship to Swati). Nevertheless, there are very significant linguistic elements at all levels of the grammar – not least the lexicon – that tie Phuthi closely to Swati historically, in fact indicating Swati to be the closest living relative of Phuthi.

== Phonology ==
Sustained field work by Simon Donnelly (UCT/Illinois/Wits Universities) in 1994–1995 among speech communities in Sigxodo and Mpapa (southern Lesotho) resulted in the discovery of a surprisingly wide range of phonological and morphological phenomena, aspects of which are unique to Phuthi (within all of the southern Bantu region).

The following phoneme inventory is found in Phuthi:

=== Vowels ===
Contrary to other Nguni languages, Phuthi has a 9-vowel system with four different heights. It has acquired a new series of "superclose" vowels /i/ and /u/ from Sotho, while the inherited Nguni high vowels are reflected as /ɪ/ and /ʊ/.

	Front	Central	Back
Close	i		u
Near-close	ɪ		ʊ
Close-mid	e		o
Open-mid	ɛ		ɔ
Open		a	

==== Vowel harmony ====
Two vowel harmony patterns propagate in opposite directions: perseverative superclose vowel height harmony (left-to-right); and anticipatory ATR/RTR tenseness harmony, invoking mid vowels [e o ɛ ɔ] (right-to-left). In the first, 'supercloseness'—also a Sesotho vocalic property—in root-final position triggers suffix vowels of the same supercloseness value. In the second, all mid vowels uninterruptedly adjacent to the right edge of a phonological word are lax ([RTR]); all other mid vowels are tense ([ATR]).

==== Vowel imbrication ====
Vowel imbrication is the vowel harmony-like morphophonological phenomenon found in many Bantu languages. Vowel imbrication in two-syllable verb roots is effectively fully productive in Phuthi, that is, -CaC-a verb stems become -CeC-e in the perfective aspect (or 'perfect tense'), e.g. -tfwatsha 'carry on the head' → -tfwetshe 'be carrying on the head', -mabha 'catch, hold' → -mebhe 'be holding'. (Cf. examples 9, 11, below).

==== Morphological use of vowel height ====
The 'supercloseness' property also active in the first vowel harmony type (above) is active in at least one paradigm of the Phuthi morphological system (the axiomatic negative polarity of the copula: "There is no..."). A morphological use for a vocalic property (here: [supercloseness]) does not appear to be recorded elsewhere for a Bantu language.

=== Consonants ===
Phuthi phonemes
		Labial	Dental/Alveolar		Post- alveolar	Velar	Glottal
		Labial	median	lateral	Post- alveolar	Velar	Glottal
Click	plain		ᵏǀ	ᵏǁ	ᵏǃ		
Click	aspirated		ᵏǀʰ	ᵏǁʰ	ᵏǃʰ		
Click	breathy		ᶢǀʱ	ᶢǁʱ	ᶢǃʱ		
Click	nasalised		ᵑǀ	ᵑǁ	ᵑǃ		
Nasal	plain	m	n		ɲ	ŋ	
Nasal	breathy	m̤	n̤		ɲ̤		
Stop	voiceless	p	t			k	
Stop	aspirated	pʰ	tʰ			kʰ	
Stop	breathy	b̤	d̤			ɡ̤	
Stop	implosive	ɓ					
Affricate	voiceless		ts	tl	tʃ		
Affricate	aspirated		tsʰ	tlʰ	tʃʰ	kxʰ	
Affricate	breathy		d̤z̤	d̤l̤	d̤ʒ̤		
Fricative	voiceless	f	s	ɬ	ʃ	x	h
Fricative	breathy	v̤	z̤		ʒ	ɣ̤	ɦ̤
Approximant	plain	w	r	l	j		
Approximant	breathy	w̤	r̤	l̤	j̤		

1. The plain voiceless stops and affricates are realised phonetically as ejectives [pʼ], [tʼ], [kʼ], [tsʼ], [tʃʼ] [tlʼ].
2. The dental affricates /ts/ and /dz/ have allophones with a labialised secondary articulation [tf] and [dv] when followed by a rounded vowel (except superclose /u/).
3. The consonants marked with a diaeresis are depressor consonants, which have an effect on the tone of their syllable.
4. The phonemes /p/, /tʰ/, /d̤/, /ʒ/, /kx/, /tl/, /tlʰ/ and /l/ occur mostly in loanwords from Sotho, not in inherited vocabulary. /k/ occurs natively only in affixes; its occurrence in roots is also loaned from Sotho.

==== Click consonants ====
Phuthi has a system of click consonants, typical for nearly all Nguni, at the three common articulation points: dental, alveolar, and lateral. But the range of manners and phonations, or click 'accompaniments', is relatively impoverished, with only four: tenuis c q x, aspirated ch qh xh, voiced gc gq gx, and nasal nc nq nx. Swati, by comparison, has clicks at only one place (dental [ǀ]), but five (or even six) manners and phonations. The reduced variety of clicks in Phuthi may be partly related to the nearly total absence of prenasalised consonants in Phuthi, assuming (for example) *nkx, *ngx would be analyzed as equivalent to prenasalized *ng, *nk.

=== Tone ===
Either of two surface tone distinctions, H (high) or L (low), is possible for each syllable (and in certain limited cases rising (LH) and falling (HL) tones are possible too). There is a subtype within the L tone category: when a syllable is 'depressed' (that is, from a depressor consonant in the onset position, or a morphologically or lexically imposed depression feature in the syllabic nucleus), the syllable is produced phonetically at a lower pitch. This system of tone depression is phonologically regular (that is, the product of a small number of phonological parameters), but is highly complex, interacting extensively with the morphology (and to some extent with the lexicon). Phonologically, Phuthi is argued to display a three-way High/Low/toneless distinction. Like all Nguni languages, Phuthi also displays phonetically rising and falling syllables, always related to the position of a depressed syllabic nucleus.

==== Depressor consonants ====
In line with a number of southern Bantu languages (including all Nguni, Venda, Tsonga and Shona), and also all Khoisan languages of southwestern Africa), a significant subset of the consonants in Phuthi are 'depressors' (or 'breathy voiced'). These consonants are so named because they have a consistent depression effect on the pitch of an immediately successive H (high) tone. In addition, these consonants produce complex non-local phonological tone-depression effects. Swati and Phuthi have similar properties in this respect, except that the parameters of the Phuthi depression effects are significantly more complex than those documented thus far for Swati.

==== Tone/voice interaction ====
Significantly complex tone/voice interactions have been identified in Phuthi. This phenomenon results in what is analysed at one level as massive and sustained violations of locality requirements on a H tone domain arising from a single H tone source, e.g. surface configurations of the type HLH (in fact H L* H) are possible where all H syllables emanate from a single underlying H source, given at least one L syllable being depressed. Such tone/voice configurations lead to grave problems for any theoretical phonology that seeks to be maximally constrained in its architecture and operations.

The last two phenomena are non-tonal suprasegmental properties which each take on an additional morphological function in Phuthi:

==== Morphological use of breathy voice/depression ====
The vocalic property breathy voice/depression is separated from the set of consonants that typically induce it, and is used grammatically in the morphological copulative – similar to the Swati copula – and elsewhere in the grammar too (e.g. in associative prefixes formed from 'weak' class noun prefixes 1,3,4,6,9).

== Phrases [with tone-marking] ==
1. Gi-ya-ku-tshádza : I like/love you.
2. Gi-visísá sí-Goní ká-nci téjhe : I understand just a little Xhosa.
3. Gi-ya-w(u)-tshádza m(ú)-ti wh-ákho lóm(u)-tjhá : I like your new homestead [Class 3].
4. Gi-ya-yi-tshádza mú-ti yh-ákho lémi-tjhá : I like your new homesteads [Class 4].
5. Gi-ya-si-visísa sí-Goní : I understand Xhosa [Class 7].
6. Gi-ya-yi-tshádza í-dlhu yh-ákho lé-tjhá : I like your new house [Class 9].
7. Gi-ya-ti-tshádza tí-dlhu t-ákho lé-tjhá : I like your new houses [Class 10].
8. Si-ya-yí-mabha í-bhîtá yh-ákho lé-kgúlú : We carry your big pot [regularly].
9. Si-yi-mábh-iye í-bhîtá yh-ákho lé-kgúlú : We are carrying your big pot [right now].
10. Si-ya-tí-mabha tí-bhîtá t-ákho léti-kgúlú : We carry your big pots [regularly].
11. Si-ti-mábhiye tí-bhîtá t-ákho léti-kgúlú : We are carrying your big pots [right now].
12. Ito lakha: Come here
13. Ku-ya-nqadza lakha kha(ha)dle: It is cold outside here

Examples 3 to 11 contain typical Bantu object-noun/object-pronoun agreement.

== Vocabulary ==
- -ciga : think (cf. Xhosa -cinga); also -nakana (cf. Sesotho -nahana)
- í-dlu : house (pl: tí-dlu)
- í-jhá : dog (pl: tí-jhá)
- téjhe : just (cf. Xhosa nje)
- ká-nci : little (cf. Xhosa ka-ncinci)
- -mabha : carry
- mú-ti : homestead (pl: mí-ti)
- sí-Goní : Xhosa (language/culture) (cf. "Nguni")
- sí-Kgúwá : English (language/culture)
- sí-Phûthî : Phuthi (language/culture)
- -tfwátsha : carry on the head (cf. Swati -tfwasa)
- -tjhá : new
- -tshádza : love (cf. Swati -tsandza)
- -visísa : understand (cf. Swati-visisa)

== Alphabet ==
A Phuthi orthography has not yet been standardised. Donnelly uses a proposed alphabet based uncontroversially on that of other Nguni and Sesotho languages:

vowels

- a e i o u

There are two superclose vowels, also found in the Sesotho languages. In the Phuthi orthography they are indicated with a circumflex diacritic, thus:

- î û

consonants

- b bh d dl (dv) dz f g gr h hh hl j jh k kg kgh kh l lh m mh n ng nh ny nyh p ph r rh s t (tf) th tj tjh tl tlh ts tsh v w wh y yh z

The following Phuthi consonant and vowel graphs have the same values they receive in Xhosa ⟨bh d gr hl kh⟩, in Swati ⟨dv tf⟩, and in Sesotho ⟨j kg ng r⟩. Symbols in parentheses are allophones of ⟨tf dv⟩. Most (non-labial) consonants can also occur with a secondary labial glide articulation ⟨w⟩, e.g. as ⟨z⟩, so also ⟨zw⟩.

clicks and click combinations

⟨c⟩ is dental; ⟨q⟩ is palatal; ⟨x⟩ is lateral.

- plain: c q x
- aspirated: ch qh xh
- voiced: gc gq gx
- nasalised: nc nq nx

== Grammar ==
=== Nouns ===
The Phuthi noun (as everywhere in Bantu) consists of two essential parts: the prefix and the stem. Nouns can be grouped into noun classes according to prefix, which are numbered consecutively according to the pan-Bantu system established by Meinhof and modified by Doke. The following table gives an overview of Phuthi noun classes, arranged according to singular-plural pairs.

Class	Doke Number	
1/2	mu-	eba-
1a/2b	Ø-	bo-
3/4	mu-	mi-
5/6	li-	ema-
7/8	si-	ti-
9/10	i-	ti-
14	bu-	
15	ku-	

- Caveat for the table: as in all Nguni and Sotho–Tswana languages, "Class 8" does not reflect Proto-Bantu Class 8 *bi-; rather, it is a near copy of Class 10, barring Class 10's homorganic nasal prefix consonant. Except in monosyllabic nouns borrowed from Sesotho, Phuthi entirely lacks this Class 9/10 N- – see phrases 6, 7 above. Thus, Phuthi Classes 8 and 10 are completely conflated.

=== Verbs ===
Verbs use the following affixes for the subject and the object:

Person/ Class	Prefix	Infix
1st sing.	gi-	-gi-
2nd sing.	u-	-wu-
1st plur.	si-	-si-
2nd plur.	li-	-li-
1	u-	-mu-
2	ba-	-ba-
3	u-	-mu-
4	i-	-yi-
5	li-	-li-
6	a-	-wa-
7	si-	-si-
8	ti-	-ti-
9	i-	-yi-
10	ti-	-ti-
14	bu-	-bu-
15	ku-	-ku-
17	ku-	-ku-
reflexive		-ti-

== Bibliography ==
- Bourquin, Walther (1927). "Die Sprache der Phuthi". Festschrift Meinhof: Sprachwissenschaftliche und andere Studien. Hamburg: Kommissionsverlag von L. Friederichsen & Co.: 279–287.
- Donnelly, Fr. Simon (1999). McKormick, K.; Mesthrie, R. (eds.). "Southern Tekela is alive: reintroducing the Phuthi language". International Journal of the Sociology of Language. 136. Walter de Gruyter GmbH: 97–120.
- Donnelly, Simon (2007). Aspects of Tone and Voice in Phuthi (Thesis). University of Illinois at Urbana-Champaign.
- Donnelly, Simon (2009) 'Tone and depression in Phuthi'. In M. Kenstowicz (ed.), Data and Theory: Papers in Phonology in Celebration of Charles W. Kisseberth. Language Sciences 31(2/3):161-178.
- Ellenberger, David-Frédéric (1912). History of the Basuto, Ancient and Modern. Translated by Macgregor, J.C. Morija, Lesotho: Morija Museum & Archives.
- Ellenberger, Victor (1933). Un Siècle de Mission au Lessouto (1833–1933). Paris: Société des Missions Evangéliques.
- Guthrie, Malcolm. (1967–1971) Comparative Bantu: An Introduction to the Comparative Linguistics and Prehistory of the Bantu Languages. (Volumes 1–4). Farnborough: Gregg International.
- Msimang, Christian T. (1989) 'Some Phonological Aspects of the Tekela Nguni Languages'. Doctoral dissertation, University of South Africa, Pretoria.
- Mzamane, Godfrey I. M. (1949). "A concise treatment on Phuthi with special reference to its relationship with Nguni and Sesotho". Fort Hare Papers. 1.4. Fort Hare: The Fort Hare University Press: 120–249.
