= Sumayela Ndebele language =

Bantu language of South Africa

Sumayela sNdebele
- SiNdebele sa seNyakatho
- Northern Transvaal Ndebele
- Native to: South Africa
- Language family: Niger–Congo?: Atlantic–Congo; Benue–Congo; Southern Bantoid; Bantu; Southern Bantu; Nguni; Tekela; Sumayela sNdebele

Language codes
- ISO 639-3: None (mis)
- Glottolog: sout2808
- Guthrie code: S.408

Sumayela Ndebele, Northern Transvaal Ndebele or siNdebele is a Bantu language of South Africa. It is spoken northeast of Southern Ndebele. The language is more prevalent in the former Northern Transvaal (Polokwane mokopane). As a people the transvaal ndebele are an offshoot of Southern Ndebele, whom further got divided into 3 kingdoms recognised by the traditional leaders council: ndebele of Mgombhane Kekana, Langa Mapela , Lebelo, Ledwaba and Mashashane.
