= Swazi language =

Bantu language spoken in Eswatini and South Africa

Swati
- siSwati
- Pronunciation: [sísʷaːtʼi]
- Native to: Eswatini; South Africa
- Ethnicity: Swazi people
- Native speakers: L1: 2.3 million (2013–2019); L2: 2.4 million (2013)
- Language family: Niger–Congo?: Atlantic–Congo; Volta-Congo; Benue–Congo; Bantoid; Southern Bantoid; Bantu; Southern Bantu; Nguni; Tekela; Swati
- Writing system: Latin (Swazi alphabet); Swazi Braille; Ditema tsa Dinoko
- Signed forms: Signed Swazi

Official status
- Official language in: South Africa; Eswatini

Language codes
- ISO 639-1: ss
- ISO 639-2: ssw
- ISO 639-3: ssw
- Glottolog: swat1243
- Guthrie code: S.43
- Linguasphere: 99-AUT-fe

Swati (Swazi)
- Person: liSwati
- People: emaSwati
- Language: siSwati
- Country: eSwatini

Geographical distribution of Swati in South Africa: proportion of the population that speaks Swati at home.: 0–20%; 20–40%; 40–60%; 60–80%; 80–100%

Geographical distribution of Swati in South Africa: density of Swati home-language speakers.: <1 /km²; 1–3 /km²; 3–10 /km²; 10–30 /km²; 30–100 /km²; 100–300 /km²; 300–1000 /km²; 1000–3000 /km²; >3000 /km²

Swazi or Swati, also known natively as siSwati, is a Bantu language of the Nguni group spoken in Eswatini (formerly Swaziland) and South Africa by the Swati people. The number of speakers is estimated to be in the region of 4.7 million including first and second language speakers. The language is taught in Eswatini and some South African schools in Mpumalanga, particularly former KaNgwane areas. Swati is an official language of Eswatini (along with English), and is also one of the twelve official languages of South Africa.

The official term is "siSwati" among native speakers; in English, Zulu, Ndebele or Xhosa it may be referred to as Swazi. Swati is most closely related to the other Tekela languages, like Phuthi and Northern Transvaal (Sumayela) Ndebele, but is also very close to the Zunda languages: Zulu, Southern Ndebele, Northern Ndebele, and Xhosa.

== Dialects ==
The Swati spoken in Eswatini can be divided into four dialects corresponding to the four administrative regions of the country: Hhohho, Lubombo, Manzini, and Shiselweni.

Swati has at least two varieties: the standard, prestige variety spoken mainly in the north, centre and southwest of the country, and a less prestigious variety spoken elsewhere.

In the far south, especially in towns such as Nhlangano and Hlatikhulu, the variety of the language spoken is significantly influenced by Zulu. Many Swazis (plural emaSwati, singular liSwati), including those in the south who speak this variety, do not regard it as 'proper' Swati. This is what may be referred to as the second dialect in the country. The sizeable number of Swati speakers in South Africa (mainly in the Mpumalanga province, and in Soweto) are considered by Eswatini Swati speakers to speak a non-standard form of the language.

Unlike the variant in the south of Eswatini, the Mpumalanga variety appears to be less influenced by Zulu, and is thus considered closer to standard Swati. However, this Mpumalanga variety is distinguishable by distinct intonation, and perhaps distinct tone patterns. Intonation patterns (and informal perceptions of 'stress') in Mpumalanga Swazi are often considered discordant to the Swazi ear. This South African variety of Swati is considered to exhibit influence from other South African languages spoken close to Swati.

A feature of the standard prestige variety of Swati (spoken in the north and centre of Eswatini) is the royal style of slow, heavily stressed enunciation, which is anecdotally claimed to have a 'mellifluous' feel to its hearers.

== Phonology ==
=== Vowels ===
Swazi vowels
	Front	Back
Close	i	u
Mid	ɛ~e	ɔ~o
Open	a	

=== Consonants ===
Swazi does not distinguish between places of articulation in its clicks. They are dental (as [ǀ]) or might also be alveolar (as [ǃ]). It does, however, distinguish five or six manners of articulation and phonation, including tenuis, aspirated, voiced, breathy voiced, nasal, and breathy-voiced nasal.

Swazi consonants
		Labial	Dental/ Alveolar		Lateral	Post- alveolar	Velar	Glottal	
		Labial	plain	nasal	Lateral	Post- alveolar	Velar	plain	nasal
Click	plain		ᵏǀ	ᵑǀ					
Click	aspirated		ᵏǀʰ	ᵑǀʰ					
Click	breathy		ᶢǀʱ	ᵑǀʱ					
Nasal		m	n			ɲ	ŋ~ŋɡ		
Plosive	ejective	pʼ	tʼ				kʼ~k̬		
Plosive	aspirated	pʰ	tʰ				kʰ		
Plosive	breathy	bʱ	dʱ				ɡʱ		
Plosive	implosive	ɓ							
Affricate	voiceless	tf	tsʼ~tsʰ			tʃʼ	kxʼ		
Affricate	voiced	dv	dzʱ			dʒʱ			
Fricative	voiceless	f	s		ɬ	ʃ		h	h̃
Fricative	voiced	v	z		ɮ	ʒ		ɦ	ɦ̃
Approximant		w			l	j			

The consonants /tsʼ kʼ ŋ/ each have two allophones. /tsʼ/ and /kʼ/ can occur as ejective sounds, [tsʼ] and [kʼ], or as their other common allophones, [tsʰ] and [k̬]. The sound /ŋ/ at the beginning of stems is [ŋ], and is usually [ŋɡ] within words.

=== Tone ===
Swazi exhibits three surface tones: high, mid and low. Tone is unwritten in the standard orthography. Traditionally, only the high and mid tones are taken to exist phonemically, with the low tone conditioned by a preceding depressor consonant. Bradshaw (2003) however argues that all three tones exist underlyingly.

Phonological processes acting on tone include:

- When a stem with non-high tone receives a prefix with underlying high tone, this high tone moves to the antepenult (or to the penult, when the onset of the antepenult is a depressor).
- High spread: all syllables between two high tones become high, as long as no depressor intervenes. This happens not only word-internally, but also across a word boundary between a verb and its object.

The depressor consonants are all voiced obstruents other than /ɓ/. The allophone [ŋ] of /ŋɡ/ appears to behave as a depressor for some rules but not others.

== Orthography ==
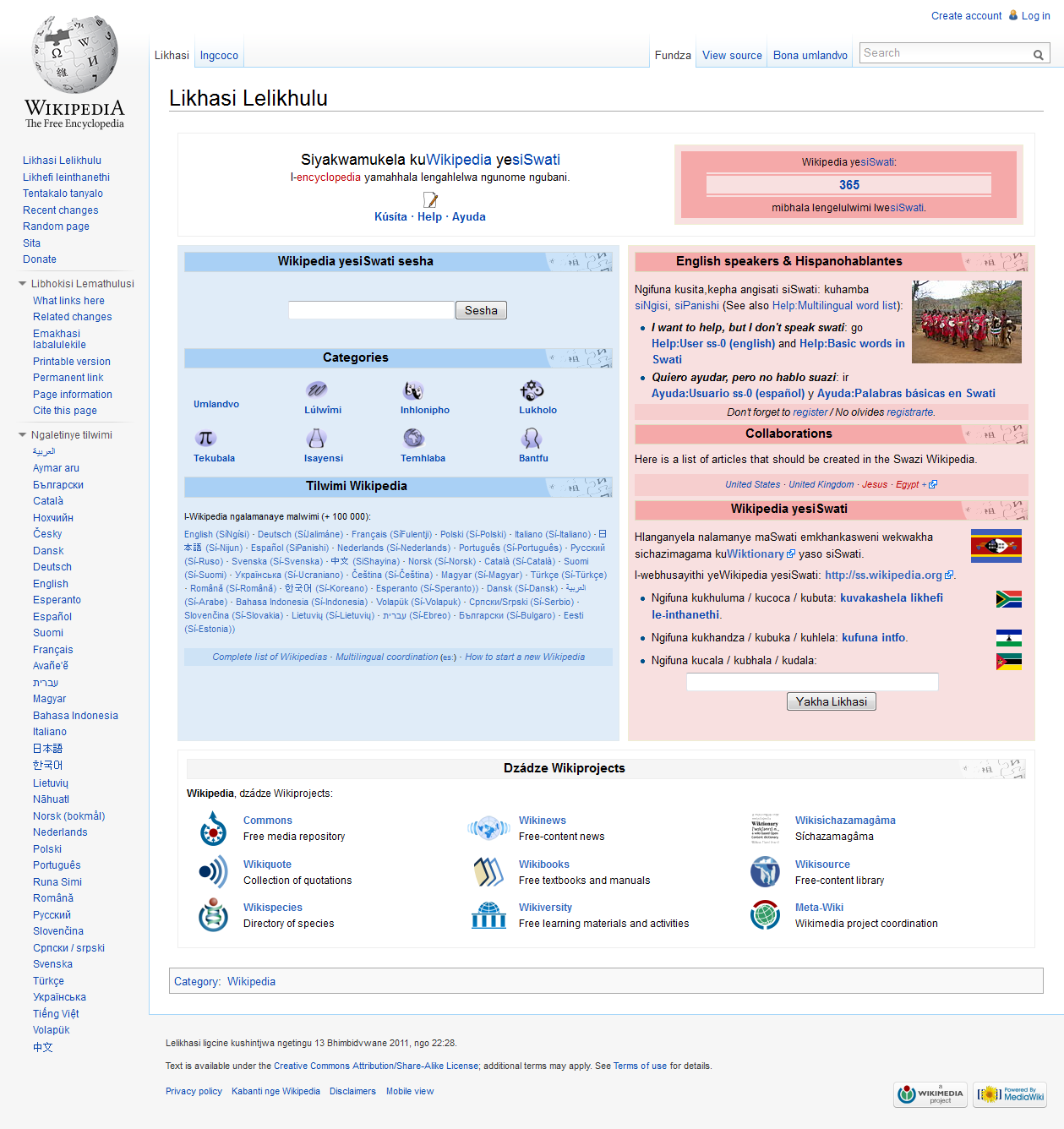
Screenshot of the Swazi-language Wikipedia

=== Vowels ===
- a - [a]
- e - [ɛ~e]
- i - [i]
- o - [ɔ~o]
- u - [u]

=== Consonants ===
- b - [ɓ]
- bh - [bʱ]
- c - [ᵏǀ]
- ch - [ᵏǀʰ]
- d - [dʱ]
- dl - [ɮ]
- dv - [dv]
- dz - [dz]
- f - [f]
- g - [gʱ]
- gc - [ᶢǀʱ]
- h - [h]
- hh - [ɦ]
- hl - [ɬ]
- j - [dʒʱ]
- k - [kʼ, k̬]
- kh - [kʰ]
- kl - [kɬ]
- l - [l]
- m - [m]
- mb - [mb]
- n - [n]
- nc - [ᵑǀ]
- nch - [ᵑǀʰ]
- ndl - [ⁿɮ]
- ng - [ŋ, ŋɡ]
- ngc - [ᵑǀʱ]
- nhl - [ⁿɫ]
- p - [pʼ]
- ph - [pʰ]
- q - [kʼ, k̬]
- s - [s]
- sh - [ʃ]
- t - [tʼ]
- tf - [tf]
- th - [tʰ]
- tj - [tʃʼ]
- ts - [tsʼ, tsʰ]
- v - [v]
- w - [w]
- y - [j]
- z - [z]
- zh - [ʒ]

=== Labialised consonants ===
- dvw - [dvʷ]
- khw - [kʰʷ]
- lw - [lʷ]
- nkhw - [ᵑkʰʷ]
- ngw - [ᵑ(g)ʷ]
- sw - [sʷ]
- vw - [vʷ]

== Grammar ==
=== Nouns ===
The Swazi noun (libito) consists of two essential parts, the prefix (sicalo) and the stem (umsuka). Using the prefixes, nouns can be grouped into noun classes, which are numbered consecutively, to ease comparison with other Bantu languages.

The following table gives an overview of Swazi noun classes, arranged according to singular-plural pairs.

Class	Singular	Plural
1/2	um(u)- (Note: umu- replaces um- before monosyllabic stems, e.g. umuntfu (person).)	ba-, be-
1a/2a	Ø-	bo-
3/4	um(u)-	imi-
5/6	li-	ema-
7/8	s(i)- (Note: s- and t- replace si- and ti- respectively before stems beginning with a vowel, e.g. sandla/tandla (hand/hands).)	t(i)-
9/10	iN- (Note: The placeholder N in the prefixes iN- and tiN- stands for m, n or no letter at all.)	tiN-
11/10	lu-, lw-	tiN-
14	bu-, b-, tj-	
15	ku-	
17	ku-	

=== Verbs ===
Verbs use the following affixes for the subject and the object:

Person/ Class	Prefix	Infix
1st sing.	ngi-	-ngi-
2nd sing.	u-	-wu-
1st plur.	si-	-si-
2nd plur.	ni-	-ni-
1	u-	-m(u)-
2	ba-	-ba-
3	u-	-m(u)-
4	i-	-yi-
5	li-	-li-
6	a-	-wa-
7	si-	-si-
8	ti-	-ti-
9	i-	-yi-
10	ti-	-ti-
11	lu-	-lu-
14	bu-	-bu-
15	ku-	-ku-
17	ku-	-ku-
reflexive		-ti-

== Counting in Swazi/Swati ==
=== Counting from 1 to 10 ===
The digital numerical counting etiquette on the fingers begins with the little finger of the left hand to the left thumb and then continues with the right-hand thumb towards the right little finger. Starting with a closed left hand, each finger is extended with each subsequent number from one to five. Once the left hand is open, then counting continues on the right hand with each finger opening in turn. It is noteworthy that in Swazi/Swati, the names for the numbers six to nine reflect either the anatomical name of the digit (six, sitsupha, means "thumb"), action (seven, sikhombisa).

IsiSwazi/isiSwati	English
Kunye	One
Kubili	Two
Kutsatfu	Three
Kune	Four
Sihlanu	Five
Sitsupha	Six
Sikhombisa	Seven
Siphohlongo	Eight
Imfica	Nine
Lishumi	Ten
Likhulu	Hundred
Inkhulungwane	Thousand

== Months ==
Swazi month names
English	Swazi/Swati
January	nguBhimbidvwane
February	yiNdlovana
March	yiNdlovulenkhulu
April	nguMabasa
May	yiNkhwekhweti
June	yiNhlaba
July	nguKholwane
August	iNgci
September	iNyoni
October	iMphala
November	Lweti
December	yiNgongoni

=== Days of the week ===
English	Swazi/Swati
Monday	Msombuluko
Tuesday	Lwesibili
Wednesday	Lwesitsatfu
Thursday	Lwesine
Friday	Lwesihlanu
Saturday	Mgcibelo
Sunday	LiSontfo

== Sample text ==
The following example of text is Article 1 of the Universal Declaration of Human Rights:

Bonkhe bantfu batalwa bakhululekile balingana ngalokufananako ngesitfunti nangemalungelo. Baphiwe ingcondvo nekucondza kanye nanembeza ngakoke bafanele batiphatse futsi baphatse nalabanye ngemoya webuzalwane.

The Declaration reads in English:

All human beings are born free and equal in dignity and rights. They are endowed with reason and conscience and should act towards one another in a spirit of brotherhood."
