= Nguni languages =

Bantu languages spoken by the Nguni people

Nguni
- Geographic distribution: Southern Africa
- Ethnicity: Nguni people
- Linguistic classification: Niger–Congo?: Atlantic–Congo; Volta-Congo; Benue–Congo; Bantoid; Southern Bantoid; Bantu; Southern Bantu; Nguni
- Proto-language: Proto-Nguni
- Subdivisions: Zunda languages; Tekela languages

Language codes
- Glottolog: ngun1267

The Nguni languages are a group of Bantu languages spoken in southern Africa (mainly South Africa, Zimbabwe and Eswatini) by the Nguni people. Nguni languages include Xhosa, Ndebele, Swati, and Zulu. The appellation "Nguni" derives from their ancestor called Mnguni. Ngoni (see below) is an older, or a shifted, variant. The Nguni languages are the indigenous languages of the subtropics of southern Africa.

It is sometimes argued that the use of Nguni as a generic label suggests a historical monolithic unity of the people in question, where in fact the situation may have been more complex. The linguistic use of the label (referring to a subgrouping of Bantu) is relatively stable.

From an English editorial perspective, the articles "a" and "an" are both used with "Nguni", but "a Nguni" is more frequent and more correct especially if "Nguni" is pronounced as it is suggested (/ŋˈɡuːni/).

== Classification ==
Proportion of the population that speaks a Nguni language at home in South Africa. Lesotho, Eswatini, Zimbabwe and southern Mozambique excluded.
- 0–20%
- 20–40%
- 40–60%
- 60–80%
- 80–100%

Density of home-language speakers of Nguni languages in South Africa. Lesotho, Eswatini, Zimbabwe and southern Mozambique excluded.
- <1 /km²
- 1–3 /km²
- 3–10 /km²
- 10–30 /km²
- 30–100 /km²
- 100–300 /km²
- 300–1000 /km²
- 1000–3000 /km²
- >3000 /km²

Within a subset of Southern Bantu, the label "Nguni" is used both genetically (in the linguistic sense) and typologically (quite apart from any historical significance).

The Nguni languages are closely related, and in many instances different languages are mutually intelligible; in this way, Nguni languages are construed as a dialect continuum. These tongues are fully separate languages that belong to separate tribes with distinct histories, lands, and tribal clans in southern africa.

In scholarly literature on southern African languages, the linguistic classificatory category Nguni is traditionally considered to subsume two subgroups: Zunda Nguni and Tekela Nguni. This division is based principally on the salient phonological distinction between corresponding coronal consonants: Zunda /z/ and Tekela /t/ (thus the native form of the name Swati and the better-known Zulu form Swazi), but there is a host of additional linguistic variables that enables a relatively straightforward division into these two substreams of Nguni.

=== Tekela languages ===
- Bhaca
- Hlubi
- Lala
- Nhlangwini
- Northern Transvaal Ndebele (Sumayela Ndebele)
- Phuthi
- Swazi

=== Zunda languages ===
- Northern Ndebele (Zimbabwean Ndebele)
- Southern Ndebele (South African Ndebele)
- Xhosa
- Zulu

Note: Maho (2009) also lists S401 Old Mfengu^{†}.

== Characteristics ==
The following aspects of Nguni languages are typical:

- A 5-vowel system, by merging the near-close and close series of Proto-Bantu. (Phuthi has re-acquired a new series of superclose vowels from Sotho)
- Spreading of high tones to the antepenultimate syllable.
- A distinction between high and low tones on noun prefixes, indicating different grammatical roles, accompanied in some cases by an overt pre-prefix called the augment.
- Development of breathy-voiced consonants, acting as depressor consonants.
- Development of aspirated consonants.
- Development of click consonants.

== Comparative data ==
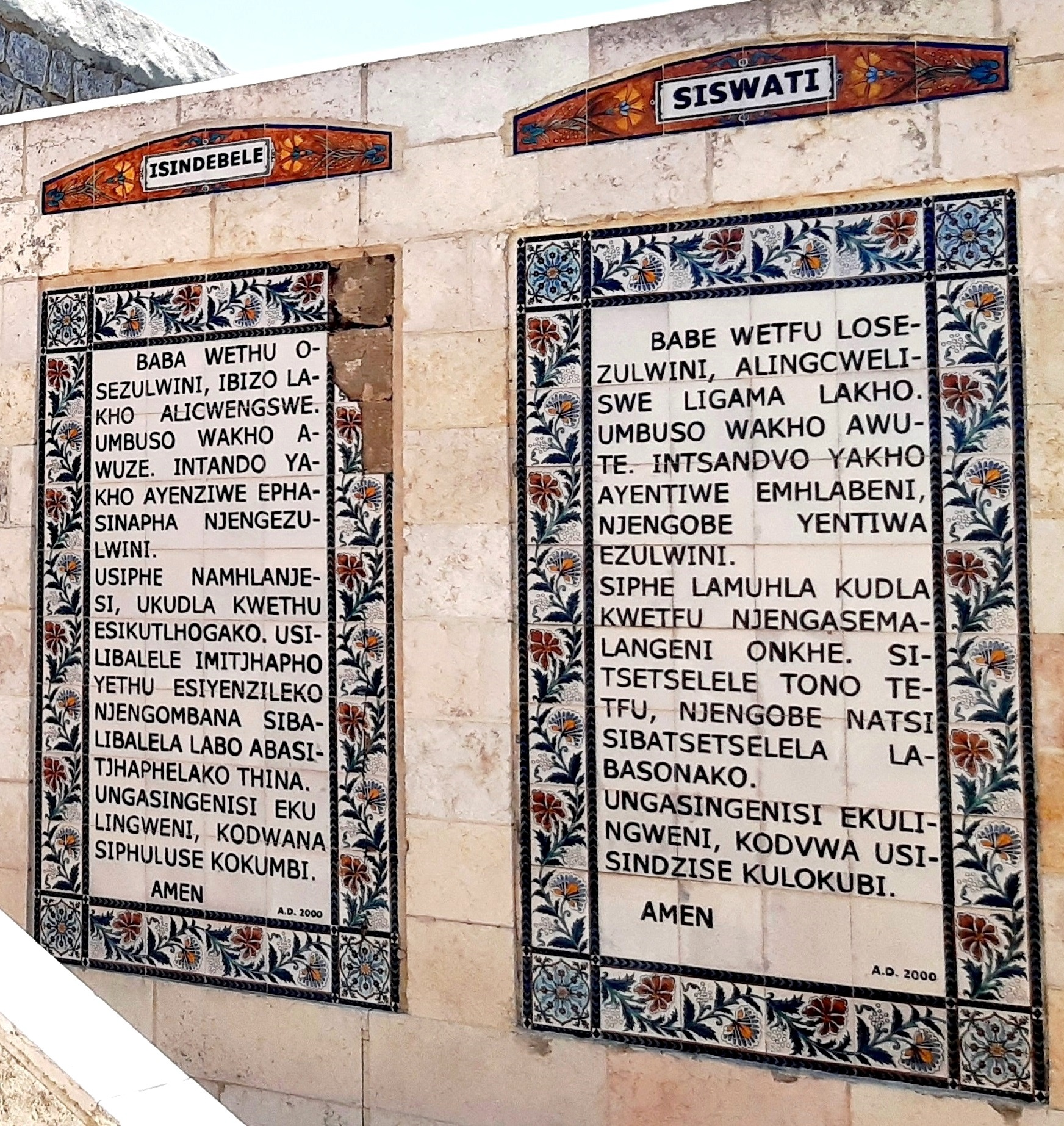
The Lord's Prayer in Southern Ndebele and Swazi respectively, displayed on tablets at the Church of the Pater Noster, Jerusalem

Compare the following sentences:

| Language | "I like your new sticks" |
|---|---|
| Zulu | Ngi-ya-zi-thanda izi-nduku z-akho ezin-tsha |
| Xhosa | Ndi-ya-zi-thanda ii-ntonga z-akho ezin-tsha |
| Northern Ndebele | Ngi-ya-zi-thanda i-ntonga z-akho ezin-tsha |
| Southern Ndebele | Ngi-ya-zi-thanda iin-ntonga z-akho ezi-tjha |
| Bhaca | Ndi-ya-ti-thsandza ii-ntfonga t-akho etin-tsha |
| Hlubi | Ng'ya-zi-thanda iin-duku z-akho ezintsha |
| Swazi | Ngi-ya-ti-tsandza ti-ntfonga t-akho letin-sha |
| Mpapa Phuthi | Gi-ya-ti-tshadza ti-tfoga t-akho leti-tjha |
| Sigxodo Phuthi | Gi-ya-ti-tshadza ti-tshoga t-akho leti-tjha |

Note: Xhosa ⟨tsh⟩ = Phuthi ⟨tjh⟩ = IPA [tʃʰ]; Phuthi ⟨tsh⟩ = [tsʰ]; Zulu ⟨sh⟩ = IPA [ʃ], but in the environment cited here /ʃ/ is "nasally permuted" to [tʃ]. Phuthi ⟨jh⟩ = breathy voiced [dʒʱ] = Xhosa, Zulu ⟨j⟩ (in the environment here following the nasal [n]). Zulu, Swazi, Hlubi ⟨ng⟩ = [ŋ].

| Language | "I understand only a little English" |
|---|---|
| Zulu | Ngisi-zwa ka-ncane isi-Ngisi |
| Xhosa | Ndisi-qonda ka-ncinci nje isi-Ngesi |
| Northern Ndebele | Ngisi-zwisisa ka-ncane isiKhiwa |
| Southern Ndebele | Ngisi-zwisisa ka-ncani nje isi-Ngisi |
| Hlubi | Ng'si-visisisa ka-ncani nje isi-Ngisi |
| Swazi | Ngisiva ka-ncane nje si-Ngisi |
| Mpapa Phuthi | Gisi-visisa ka-nci të-jhë Si-kguwa |
| Sigxodo Phuthi | Gisi-visisa ka-ncinci të-jhë Si-kguwa |

Note: Phuthi ⟨kg⟩ = IPA [x].

== See also ==
- Ngoni is the ethnonym and language name of a group living in Malawi, who are a geographically distant descendant of South African Nguni. Ngoni dialect separated from all other Nguni languages subsequent to the massive political and social upheaval within southern Africa, the mfecane, which lasted until the 1830s, and is now extinct.
- IsiNgqumo is an argot spoken by the homosexuals of South Africa who speak Bantu languages; as opposed to Gayle, the argot spoken by South African homosexuals who speak Germanic languages. IsiNgqumo is based on an Nguni lexicon.
