= Depressor consonant =

Consonant that lowers the tone of its or adjacent syllables

A depressor consonant is a consonant that depresses (lowers) the tone of its or a neighboring syllable. This is a consequence of the phonation (type of voicing) of the consonant. The Nguni languages of South Africa are well known for the lowering effects of certain breathy consonants on tone, as are the Wu dialects of Chinese. Specific examples of languages with depressor consonants are Zulu and Shanghainese. Many other tonal languages may have depressor consonants that slightly lower the pitch, but do not have any phonemic effects, as is the case with Chichewa tones.

== See also ==
- Tonogenesis
