= Henry Pulleine =

Commander in the British Army (1838–1879)

Henry Burmester Pulleine
- Born: 12 December 1838; Yorkshire, England
- Died: 22 January 1879 (aged 40); Isandlwana, Colony of Natal
- Military career
- Allegiance: United Kingdom
- Branch: British Army
- Service years: 1855–1879
- Rank: Brevet Lieutenant Colonel
- Conflicts: Xhosa Wars; Anglo-Zulu War

Lieutenant Colonel Henry Burmester Pulleine (12 December 1838 – 22 January 1879) was an administrator and commander in the British Army in the Cape Frontier and Anglo-Zulu Wars. He is most notable as a commander of British forces at the disastrous Battle of Isandlwana in January 1879. Substantively a major, he held the rank of brevet lieutenant colonel.

== Early life ==
Pulleine was born in Yorkshire, the son of a vicar. His original commission into the British Army's 30th Regiment, was obtained without purchase in 1855 after his graduation from Sandhurst. He transferred to the brand new 2nd Battalion of the 24th in 1858 as a lieutenant and was promoted captain in 1861. In 1871 Pulleine bought a majority in the regiment's 1st Battalion, which was then sent to South Africa. Despite a brevet promotion to lieutenant-colonel in 1877 and over twenty years' service, he had no first hand combat experience.

== 9th Cape Frontier War ==
This would soon change when war broke out between the British and the Xhosa in the Eastern Cape. During British operations in the Cape Frontier, Pulleine was responsible for raising irregular cavalry from amongst European settlers in the area. They acquitted themselves well and, combined with Pulleine's work organising supply columns to besieged British garrisons, earned Pulleine a deserved reputation as an organiser and administrator. With the war at an end Pulliene took over as commandant of Durban-KZN, and subsequently commanded the Army's remount depot at Pietermaritzburg.

== Anglo-Zulu War ==
When hostilities began on 11 January 1879 Pulleine was still in command of the Pietermaritzburg remount depot, and hurried to rejoin his regiment, arriving on the 17th. The 1st Battalion of the 24th Regiment comprised the main infantry component of Lord Chelmsford's Number 3 Column, which had crossed into Zululand on 11 January. With the 1st Battalion's commanding officer, Colonel Richard Glyn appointed by Chelmsford to command of the No. 3 Column, Pulleine would exercise field command of the battalion during its operations in Zululand.

Following a reconnaissance by Major John Dartnell and units of the column's irregular cavalry on the 21st, which suggested the Zulus were present in force to the South of the camp, Chelmsford ordered an advance with approximately half the column on the morning of the 22nd. In accordance with his original vision of the campaign, his intention was to bring the enemy to battle, ending the war quickly by destroying the Zulu force in a set-piece engagement. Chelmsford's last act regarding the defence of Isandlwana was to order up troops under Lieutenant-Colonel Anthony Durnford from Rorke's Drift. With the 1st Battalion of the 24th being left in camp, Pulleine took over command of Isandlwana on the morning of 22 January.

== Battle of Isandlwana ==
Under Pulleine's command were the 416 officers and men of his own 1/24th and a company of the 2/24th. Also present was a two-gun section from N Battery of the Royal Artillery's 5th Brigade, and assorted support units, including Royal Engineers, Army Service Corps and Army Hospital Corps. In addition, Pulleine had at his disposal an assortment of local forces. These included four companies of the Natal Native Contingent, traditionally armed and equipped African troops with white officers and NCOs, and units such as the Newcastle Mounted Rifles and Natal Mounted Police, irregular cavalry made up of white volunteers armed with firearms. The arrival of Durnford's column in mid morning added a British rocket troop, two additional companies of the NNC and about 200 native irregular cavalry; some 500 men all told.

With the developing Zulu threat becoming increasingly apparent, Durnford's arrival created some confusion as to the camp's command arrangements. As a substantive Lieutenant Colonel and brevet Colonel, Durnford was senior in rank to Pulleine. But Durnford's orders, as given to him by Chelmsford's secretary John North Crealock, were ambiguous, failing both to clarify the command arrangements, and to instruct Durnford as to what if any, specific actions he was to take beyond simply moving his troops to Isandlwana. On receiving a report that the Zulus were retiring, Durnford decided on an advance by his own command. Initially he asked for two companies of Pulleine's infantry to accompany him, but Pulleine disagreed, indicating that the request was not in accordance with Chelmsford's orders to defend the camp.

The Zulus' had not initially intended to attack the British on the 22nd. However, the discovery of the Zulu main body by a cavalry patrol, possibly combined with the Zulus' realisation that the British had divided their army and the eagerness of the younger warriors, precipitated a full-scale attack on the camp. Pulleine's response was complicated by Durnford, who had been pinned down while chasing the supposedly retreating enemy force. Pulleine thus had to deploy his troops in such a way as to defend the camp and try to support Durnford in his attempt to break contact with the Zulus and withdraw.

The terrain at Isandlwana, consisting of tall grass and ravines, called Dongas, into which the advancing Zulus periodically disappeared, shielded the movements of the Zulu army from view of the British. It was hard to gauge exactly how many Zulus the British were facing, as the estimates of their numbers Pulleine had received from his scouts varied considerably. By the time the full extent of the Zulu threat had become apparent, it was largely too late for Pulleine to alter his dispositions significantly. The result was an overextended line, vulnerable to being outflanked by such a large enemy force. Even had Pulleine managed to effect an orderly withdrawal at this stage, there was no easily defensible position for him to retreat to, since the Isandlwana camp was not fortified, nor were the wagons laagered.

Though the British were able to hold the Zulus at bay for a time, a combination of factors including dwindling ammunition supply, problems with the infantry rifle which led to jams and the over-extension of the British companies to try to prevent the Zulu battle formation's encircling 'horns' from flanking the line, led to a general collapse. The Zulus overran the camp, eradicating any survivors who tried to make a stand, and chasing stragglers as far as the Buffalo River before overtaking and killing them. Pulleine was not among the small number of Europeans to escape. The Battle of Isandlwana was the worst defeat suffered by the British army in 150 years.

== Death ==
It has never been established conclusively where and when on the battlefield Pulleine died. His body was never positively identified, and there were few survivors to provide an account of his final actions. Chelmsford did not linger at Isandlwana, and so only cursory efforts to identify the remains were possible. Even if a thorough search had immediately been mounted, most of the bodies had been badly mutilated by the Zulus and by the time a concerted effort was made to identify and inter the bodies, several months had passed, making individual corpses even harder to identify.

Donald Morris, in The Washing of the Spears, possibly basing his account on that which circulated amongst the 24th's officers after the battle, provides probably the fullest account of Pulleine's final moments. In his version, once it became clear the battle was lost, Pulleine ordered Melvill to attempt to escape with the colour before retiring to his tent, possibly to write a letter to his family, or alternatively to sketch a report of the defeat for Chelmsford. Before he could finish a Zulu confronted him and, despite wounding the man in the neck with his revolver, Pulleine was fatally stabbed by an assegai.

An unknown source describes Pulleine as having died 'early' in the fighting, and according to Henry Curling of the N/5 battery, Coghill informed him Pulleine was dead when he met Curling and Stuart-Smith as they began their flight to the Buffalo River. This account is supported by that of another British survivor Pte Bickley, who mentions Coghill reporting to Melvill that Pulleine 'had been shot.' This version of events would explain why Durnford was apparently unable to locate Pulleine once his force returned to the camp as the rout began. Furthermore, in his memoir A Lost Legionary in South Africa, Commandant George Hamilton Browne describes coming across and saluting Pulleine's corpse on his way back from visiting his tent on the morning of the 23rd. Hamilton-Browne's 1st/3rd NNC had their tents on the extreme left of the camp, so the account would be consistent with Pulleine having died here.

It is also possible that Pulleine survived the British collapse, only to be killed in one of the desperate last stands which took place after it became obvious the British were doomed. Such a scenario is supported by at least one survivor's account. Cracroft Nourse, a company commander with the NNC, describes how he saw 'half a company of the 24th, with their colonel in their midst, assegaied.' near the foot of Isandlwana hill as he began his escape.

== Analysis ==
Pulleine remains an obscure figure in the history of the Anglo-Zulu war. This is perhaps summed up in his portrayal by Denholm Elliott in 1979's Zulu Dawn, as an affable, though retiring and somewhat ineffectual man. He was an able administrator, both in the commissariat department in the 1860s, for which he had received a commendation, and in South Africa during the Xhosa wars.

Pulleine's dispositions at Isandlwana were a contributing factor in the British defeat. Yet he had to deploy his men further from the camp in order to assist Durnford, who would have been unable to disengage and retire alone, and whom Pulleine had promised to support. Also, Pulleine would almost certainly have read a document penned by Chelmsford and circulated ‘for the consideration of officers commanding columns when entering Zululand,’ which recommended a deployment very similar to that effected by Pulleine. Ultimately, even Pulleine's flawed line held the Zulus in check until ammunition ran low, and units began to lose cohesion as they retreated and were set upon by the Zulus in close combat.

Pulleine's greatest failing as a commander, though he was by no means alone in this, was an abiding underestimation of his foe. The leisurely attitude of the British officers, including Pulleine, in the period immediately preceding the final engagement, demonstrate the complacency which permeated the thinking of the officer corps in the initial phase of the Anglo-Zulu war. For most of 22 January, Pulleine and his colleagues did not seriously think that the Zulus would attack the camp, so that when the Impis did strike, normal precautions such as the striking of tents and suspension of routine camp activities had not taken place. The former was of particular significance since it would have provided a much clearer signal to Chelmsford that the camp was in real trouble, and may have induced him to hurry back in time to rescue the situation.

Finally, the decisive action needed to avoid disaster was prevented by the confused command situation precipitated by Crealock's vague orders, which failed to confirm Durnford in command, or to give him any specific instructions. Chelmsford later attempted to lay the blame for the defeat on Durnford, suggesting that he had disobeyed Chelmsford's order to ‘take command,’ and thus be bound by the earlier instruction to Pulleine to defend the camp. This is however unfair, since Chelmsford's original order, recovered from Crealock's order book on the field, contains no specific reference to ‘taking command.’ Because of this, Durnford acted with considerable freedom in making what was ultimately a mistaken decision to go on the offensive, and in this regard Pulleine's reluctance to commit any of the 24th's infantry companies to Durnford's advance was sound.

== See also ==
- Battle of Isandlwana
- Rorke's Drift
- Zulu (film)
- Zulu Dawn

== Notes ==
=== References ===
- David, Saul (2004). Zulu the Heroism and Tragedy of the Zulu War of 1879. London: Penguin.
- Hamilton Browne, Col G. T. (1912). A Lost Legionary in South Africa. London: Werner Laurie.
- Knight, Ian (2002). Isandlwana, the Great Zulu Victory. Oxford: Osprey.
- Knight, Ian (2010). Zulu Rising, the Epic Story of Isandlwana and Rorke's Drift. London: Pan.
- Morris, Donald R. (1970). The Washing of the Spears, the Rise and Fall of the Zulu Nation. London: Book Club Associates.
