= Royal Field Artillery =

Unit of the British Army from 1899 to 1924

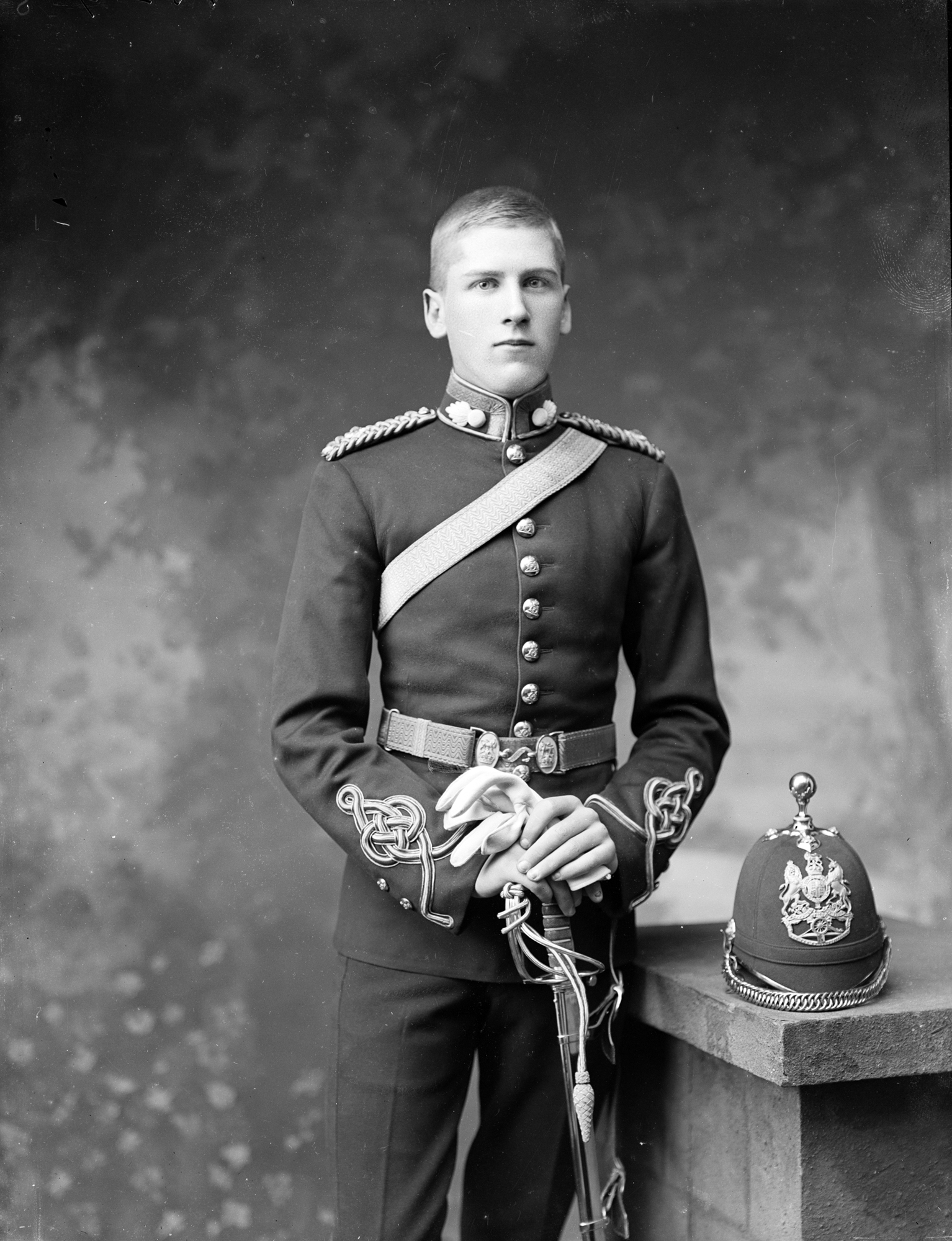
Irish member of the Royal Field Artillery, 1904

The Royal Field Artillery (RFA) of the British Army provided close artillery support for the infantry.

== History ==
It was created as a distinct arm of the Royal Regiment of Artillery on 1 July 1899, serving alongside the other two arms of the regiment, the Royal Horse Artillery (RHA) and the Royal Garrison Artillery (RGA). It ceased to exist when it was amalgamated with the Royal Garrison Artillery in 1924. The Royal Field Artillery was the largest arm of the artillery. It was responsible for the medium calibre guns and howitzers deployed close to the front line and was reasonably mobile. It was organised into brigades, attached to divisions or higher formation

The Royal Field Artillery grew dramatically during the First World War, reaching a size of over three hundred thousand men and more than 400 batteries by 1917.

== Football ==
121st Batt. R.F.A.
- Full name: 121st Battery Royal Field Artillery Football Club
- Founded: 1900
- Dissolved: c. 1914
- Ground: depended on station
colours

The 121st Battery of the Royal Field Artillery's association football team occasionally played non-army sides, based on where it was stationed. Its first record is from the 1900–01 season, when it was based in Trowbridge, and it played in the Devon area when based at Topsham in 1901–02.

Back in Trowbridge in 1904, the club won the Wiltshire amateur title in 1905–06, and joined the Western Football League Second Division in 1906. However, at the end of the season, in which the club finished second from last, it resigned. It played in Irish amateur football leading up to the First World War.

=== Colours ===
The side wore blue jerseys with a red sash.

== Notable members ==
- Ernest Wright Alexander, Victoria Cross recipient
- Tom Barry, served in Mesopotamian campaign
- Ralph Chetwynd (1890-1957), Canadian businessman and politician, recipient of Military Cross 1918
- Henry Curling, sole British front line officer to survive the Battle of Isandlwana
- Colin Gubbins (1896–1976), prime mover of the Special Operations Executive (SOE)
- Dar Lyon (1898–1964), first-class cricketer
- Norman Manley (1893–1969), first Premier of Jamaica, serving from 14 August 1959 to 29 April 1962
- Donald McLeod (1882–1917), represented Scotland in football
- Cecil Patteson Nickalls, D.S.O. (1877-1925), champion polo player
- Alfred William Saunders (1888–1930), World War I flying ace
- Garth Neville Walford, Victoria Cross recipient
- Francis Wallington, first recipient of the Military Cross four times

== Bibliography ==
- Carman, W.Y. (1973). The Royal Artillery. Vol. 25 of Man-at-Arms Series. Oxford: Osprey Publishing. ISBN 0-85045-140-X.
- Clarke, Dale (2004). British Artillery 1914–19 Field Army Artillery. Vol. 94 of New Vanguard Series. Oxford: Osprey Publishing. ISBN 1-84176-688-7.
