= Zulu Dawn =

1979 film directed by Douglas Hickox

- UK film poster by Tom Chantrell
- Directed by: Douglas Hickox
- Screenplay by: Cy Endfield; Anthony Storey
- Story by: Cy Endfield
- Produced by: Nate Kohn
- Starring: Burt Lancaster; Peter O'Toole; Simon Ward; Nigel Davenport; Michael Jayston; Peter Vaughan; James Faulkner; Denholm Elliott; John Mills; Dai Bradley; Christopher Cazenove; Ronald Pickup; Bob Hoskins
- Cinematography: Ousama Rawi
- Edited by: Malcolm Cooke
- Music by: Elmer Bernstein
- Production company: Samarkand Productions; Lamitas; Zulu Dawn Films
- Distributed by: Tedderwick Films, Ltd. (UK); American Cinema Releasing (US)
- Release dates: 29 October 1979 (UK); 14 December 1979 (US)
- Running time: 117 minutes
- Country: United Kingdom; United States; Netherlands
- Language: English
- Budget: $11.75 million($51 million in 2025 dollars)

Zulu Dawn is a 1979 epic historical war film directed by Douglas Hickox, from a screenplay co-written by Cy Endfield. It dramatizes the Battle of Isandlwana in 1879 between British and Zulu forces in South Africa, in the Anglo-Zulu War. It serves as a prequel to Endfield's 1964 film Zulu, which was about the subsequent Battle of Rorke's Drift.

Like Zulu, the film stars an ensemble cast, featuring Burt Lancaster, Peter O'Toole, Simon Ward, Nigel Davenport, Michael Jayston, Peter Vaughan, James Faulkner, Denholm Elliott, Ken Gampu, Bob Hoskins, Christopher Cazenove and John Mills.

The film held its world premiere in London on 29 October 1979. Unlike its predecessor, the film was a critical and commercial disappointment.

== Plot ==
In the Cape Colony in January 1879, British Army officer Lord Chelmsford plots with diplomat Sir Henry Bartle Frere to annex the neighbouring Zulu Empire, which they perceive as a threat to the Cape Colony's emerging industrial economy.

Frere issues an ultimatum to the Zulu king, Cetshwayo, demanding that he dissolve the Zulu military; an indignant Cetshwayo rebuffs the demand, providing Lord Chelmsford and Frere with a casus belli against the Zulu. Despite objections from prominent individuals in the Cape Colony and Britain, Frere authorises Lord Chelmsford to command a British expeditionary force to invade the Zulu Empire.

The British expeditionary force marches into the Zulu Empire, with Lord Chelmsford directing it towards the Zulu capital, Ulundi. Eager to bring the war to a swift conclusion, the British become increasingly frustrated as the Zulu military adopted a Fabian strategy, refusing to engage in a pitched battle; a few skirmishes occurred between British and Zulu scouts with indecisive results. Three Zulu warriors allowed themselves to be captured in a skirmish and are interrogated by the British, but refused to divulge any information and eventually escape, informing their commander of the British dispositions. Halfway to Ulundi, Lord Chelmsford ordered the British force to make camp at the base of Mount Isandlwana, ignoring the advice of his Boer attendants to fortify the camp and transform his supply wagons into a laager.

Upon receiving inaccurate reports from his scouts concerning the Zulus' dispositions, Lord Chelmsford leads half the British force on a wild goose chase far from the camp against a phantom Zulu force. The next day, the British camp receives reinforcements led by Colonel Durnford, who dispatches scouts to reconnoiter the surrounding area before leaving the camp to personally scout the region. One of the British scouting parties discovers a Zulu force massing at the bottom of a nearby valley. The Zulu force quickly attacks the British camp, but are initially repulsed; however, they spread out and adopt a strategy of encircling the British, who are eventually pushed back after they run out of ammunition. A massed infantry charge by the Zulu force breaks the British lines, causing them to retreat towards their camp. Overwhelmed by the attacking Zulus, the British force collapses and is quickly massacred.

Zulu warriors quickly hunt down any British survivors fleeing the battle, while several British soldiers attempt an unsuccessful last stand. The British camp's commander, Colonel Pulleine, entrusts a regimental colour to his soldiers, who attempt to carry it safely back to the Cape Colony; they pass numerous dead and dying British soldiers during their journey. Eventually reaching the Buffalo River, the British soldiers are discovered and killed by Zulu warriors; the colour is captured by a Zulu. Lieutenant Vereker, who lies wounded and trapped under his fallen horse, shoots and kills the Zulu wielding the colour, who drops it into the river, where it floats out of reach of the Zulu force.

In the evening, Lord Chelmsford returns to the scene of the battle, and receives news that a Zulu force has attacked Rorke's Drift. Zulu warriors drag captured artillery back to Ulundi.

== Cast ==
- Burt Lancaster as Colonel Anthony Durnford
- Peter O'Toole as Lieutenant General Lord Chelmsford
- Denholm Elliott as Colonel Henry Pulleine
- James Faulkner as Lieutenant Teignmouth Melvill
- Christopher Cazenove as Lieutenant Nevill Coghill
- Simon Ward as Lieutenant William Vereker
- Bob Hoskins as Colour Sergeant Williams
- Nigel Davenport as Colonel George Hamilton-Brown
- Peter Vaughan as Quartermaster Bloomfield
- Michael Jayston as Colonel Henry Hope Crealock
- Ronald Pickup as Lieutenant Harford
- Ronald Lacey as Norris "Noggs" Newman
- John Mills as Sir Henry Bartle Frere
- Simon Sabela as King Cetshwayo
- Ken Gampu as Mantshonga
- Abe Temba as Uhama
- Gilbert Tiabane as Bayele
- Paul Mafela as Zulu prisoner
- Muntu Ndebele as Siswe
- Dai Bradley as Private Williams
- Paul Copley as Corporal Storey
- Donald Pickering as Major Russell R.A.
- Nicholas Clay as Lieutenant Raw
- Phil Daniels as Boy Pullen
- Ian Yule as Corporal Fields
- Peter J. Elliott as Sentry
- Brian O'Shaughnessy as Major Smith R.A.
- Freddie Jones as Bishop John Colenso
- Anna Calder-Marshall as Fanny Colenso
- Chris Chittell as Lieutenant Milne
- Patrick Mynhardt as Colonel Harness
- Jan Bruyns as Elder Boer
- Sydney Chama as S.M. Kambula
- Kenneth Baker as Mr de Witt
- Claire Marshall as Mrs de Witt
- Vivienne Drummond as Lady Frere
- Don Leonard as Fannin
- Graham Armitage as Captain John Shepstone

== Production ==
=== Development ===
Zulu, produced by Stanley Baker (who also starred) and Cy Endfield (who also directed) had been a huge financial success. However the next Baker-Endfield collaboration, Sands of the Kalahari (1965) was a critical and commercial disappointment and the two men ended their association.

In 1971 Endfield approached Stanley Baker with the idea of making a prequel to Zulu that would focus on the Battle of Isandlwana. In 1974 Endfield and Baker were working on a script. That year Endfield secured co operation of Mangosuthy Buthelezi and in 1975 Endfield sent Joseph E. Levine a script for Zulu Dawn. However plans to make the film were delayed when Baker died in 1976.

Endfield met an American producer, Nate Kohn, who was living in London and they discussed various projects including a film on Belle Starr and a gangster movie. Kohn became interested in the Zulu Dawn project and introduced Endfield to a Rhodesian producer who had funds.

In 1978 it was reported Endfield had written a script on an electric typewriter he had helped develop. He wrote the script with academic Anthony Storey. Kohn asked Endfield to direct the film but he refused and instead recommened Douglas Hickox who had been Endfield's assistant director on some films in the 1950s.

Douglas Hickox later said:

Historically, it’s fascinating, because the English did to the Zulus what Hitler did to Poland—provoked a war with a perfectly reasonable race. They certainly were a race of warriors, but, in fact, Cetshwayo, who was a very tolerant and intelligent King, liked the English. Now Chelmsford and Sir Bartle Frere, against the advice of the British government, provoked a war with the Zulus, thinking they were going to go in and teach “the Savages” a lesson. The fact that there was this giant massacre nearly caused the downfall of Disraeli’s government. The English, who had never lost a colonial battle before, sent out reinforcements and they thrashed the Zulus so thoroughly at the battle of Ulundi, that they broke the spirit of the Zulu nation.

Hickcox also said the script was "very concerned with the individual. There’s absolutely no point in hacking a thousand faceless people to death. We go to great lengths to establish the character of each person, and we have an extraordinarily good English cast, all superlative actors."

=== Finance ===
The movie was made by the London-based Samarkand Productions, formed by actor James Faulkner, Barrie Saint Clair, Nate Kohn and Dieter Nobbe.

British film financier Guy Collins helped raise finance, persuading some Swiss banks to invest in the movie.

Part of the budget was raised by the Lamitas Property Investment Corporation which had financed a series of films, including several in South Africa, such as The Wild Geese (1978). Lamitas committed about £5 million to Zulu Dawn, most of it raised from a Swiss bank, the Banque de Paris et des Pays-Bas. HBO helped guarantee finance.

In 1978, producers and financiers agreed to defer fees.

=== Casting ===
John Hurt was cast in a lead role but was refused entry to South Africa. This confused Hurt, who was not particularly active politically. It was thought BOSS may have confused him with the American actor John Heard, who had been arrested in an anti-Apartheid march.

It was Peter O'Toole's first film since his break up with wife Sian Phillips and business partner Jules Buck, and a long illness.

Burt Lancaster agreed to star. However his agent insisted on a letter of credit for his salary. The American Fletcher Bank, based in Geneva, would only agree to act as underwriter if Collins and Jake Eberts personally guaranteed that the funds would be available to honour the letter of credit. Eberts agreed. "God knows why I did it," he said later. "It is easy to fall in love with your project. It was one of those situations where you put in so much time and effort, and you are so convinced that you are going to raise the money, that you feel there is no real risk, or that what little risk there is is worth taking to keep the show on the road. So I signed a personal guarantee."

Eberts got his friend, Fred Stein, to forward the funds to cover Fletcher Bank's guarantee, believing that the film soon attract additional finance, not go over budget, and had a completion guarantor attached to it.

Eberts soon discovered that there was no additional finance, the completion guarantee had fallen through and the film was going over budget. He made "personally risky arrangements" to cover Stein's investment.

=== Shooting ===
Filming took place in June 1978 in Natal, South Africa. Locations included Babanango, and Pietermaritzburg.

Every day of filming, more than 1,000 people were involved. Zulu extras were paid £2.70 per day. Hickox said:

The battle breaks down into four parts: one, the threat; two, attack; three, the camp overwhelmed; and four, a running, fleeing fugitive sequence. So every time we come back to the battle there will be another style of fighting going on, in order that we don't just use similar material. To do that, we’ve made a hundred maps for this film. When you are dealing with a thousand people every day, minimum, it is imperative that everybody know where every wagon, ox, horse and cavalry line is—where the field kitchens are, and what state the uniforms are in. I can show you a call sheet for the first day of shooting that specified 1,250 people.

Initially set at $6.5 million, the budget kept increasing. The film ultimately cost $11.75 million, despite coming in only two days over schedule. Eberts later wrote "The picture went way over budget; key people in the production were either incompetent, dishonest or both."

=== Music ===
In 1978, David Japp, founder and MD of London-based composers agency The First Composers Company, met producer Nate Kohn and suggested he use composer Mike Batt – an accomplished composer and arranger of orchestral music best known for his pop compositions for children's TV series The Wombles and the pop-chart hits of the songs from the series, and, in particular, for the song "Bright Eyes" from the animated film Watership Down (1978) – to commission to the score. However, shortly after the agreement was signed and the first third of the fee paid, Kohn informed Japp that the producers had changed their minds and wanted a "name" to help with the film's promotion. Devastated, Batt refused to accept the rest of the "pay or play" fee, due under the terms of the signed agreement.

Japp sent his US client list to Kohn, who selected Elmer Bernstein. Japp negotiated the highest fee that Bernstein had ever been paid. Only after the score had been recorded at Abbey Road Studios and the film shown at Cannes did Japp find out the producers mistakenly thought they were hiring Leonard Bernstein, famed conductor and composer of dozens of orchestral compositions and film scores, notably West Side Story.

== Release ==
The film was meant to premiere in January 1979, the centenary of the Battle of Isandlhwana. However, the release was delayed due to a series of legal issues relating to the financing of the film and the fact it went over budget.

Co-producers James Faulkner and Barrie Saint Clair claim they were owed £100,000 in deferred fees and sought an injunction to block screenings of Zulu Dawn until they were paid. Over 100 South African creditors allege they were owed £250,000, and forced the local production company into liquidation. Another suit was brought by Norma Foster, who acted as a liaison between the South African government (notably the Minister of Information, Dr Connie Mulder) and the filmmakers; she later claimed the producers owed her £20,000 for her services which they refused to pay.

Lamitas denied liability, claiming expenses exceeded the agreed budget. The injunction was lifted 21 May 1979. Lamitas later offered to settle for £25 on the pound. The movie had its world premiere in London on 29 October 1979.

=== Home media ===
The film has been released on remastered Blu-Ray and 4K Blu-Ray by Severin Films.

== Reception ==
The movie flopped in Britain and failed to find a distributor in the US. It did not recoup its costs.

Eberts became liable for the guarantee, almost went bankrupt, and struggled to pay the loan which by 1983 had reached $475,000. This debt was a crucial factor in Eberts leaving Goldcrest Films and accepting a lucrative contract with Embassy Films.

The film has received mixed reviews. On review aggregation website Rotten Tomatoes, Zulu Dawn has an approval rating of 60% based on 10 reviews and an average rating of 6.2/10.

== Novelisation ==
Endfield also wrote a novelisation of his screenplay, which was published by Arrow Books and released shortly before the film.

== Notes ==
- Neve, Brian. The Many Lives of Cy Endfield: Film noir, the blacklist and Zulu. The University of Wisconsin Press. ISBN 978-0-299-30374-7.
