= Anthony Durnford =

British Army officer (1830–1879)

Anthony William Durnford
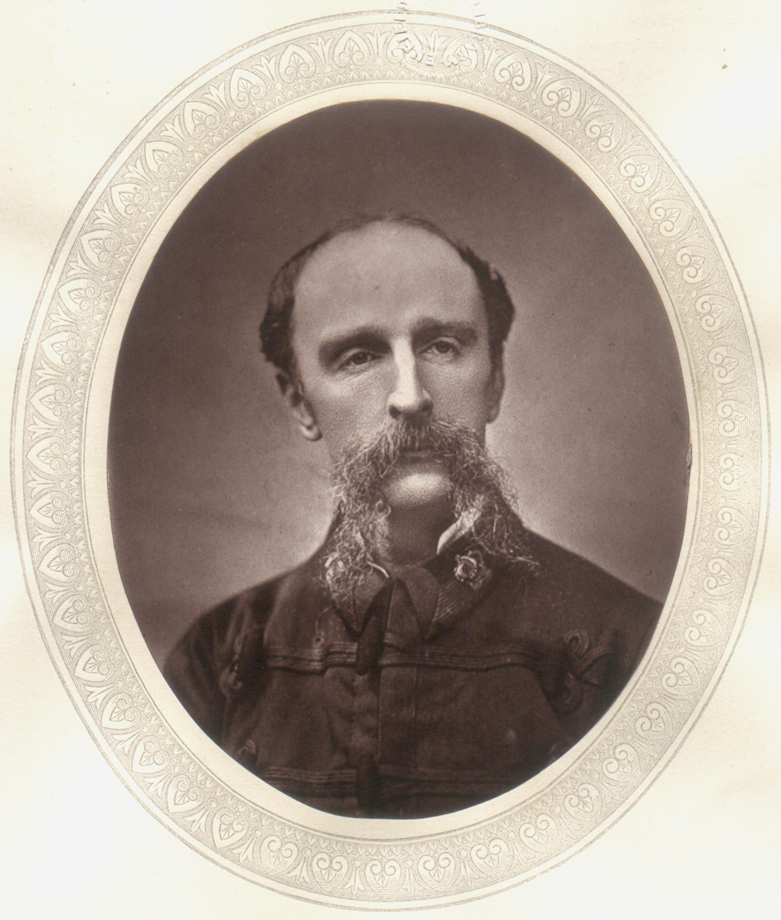
- Anthony Durnford in 1870
- Born: 24 May 1830; Manorhamilton, County Leitrim, Ireland
- Died: 22 January 1879 (aged 48); Isandlwana, South Africa
- Burial place: St George's Garrison Church, Fort Napier, Pietermaritzburg, South Africa
- Spouse: Frances Tranchell
- Military career
- Allegiance: United Kingdom
- Branch: British Army
- Service years: 1848–1879
- Rank: Lieutenant-Colonel (United Kingdom) (substantive grade) Colonel (United Kingdom) (honorable rank)
- Units: Royal Engineers
- Commands: No. 2 Column, Zululand Invasion Force
- Conflicts: Xhosa Wars; Anglo-Zulu War; Battle of Isandlwana †

Lieutenant-Colonel (substantive grade) Anthony William Durnford (24 May 1830 – 22 January 1879) was a British Army officer of the Royal Engineers who served in the Anglo-Zulu War. Breveted colonel effective 31 December 1878, Durnford is mainly known for his defeat by the Zulus at the Battle of Isandlwana, which was a disaster for the British Army.

== Background ==
Durnford was born into an Anglo-Irish military family at Manorhamilton, County Leitrim, Ireland, on 24 May 1830. His father was General Edward William Durnford, also of the Royal Engineers. His younger brother, Edward, also served in the British military, as a lieutenant-colonel in the Royal Marine Artillery. During his formative years he lived with his uncle in Düsseldorf, Germany.

In July 1846 Durnford returned to England to enter the Royal Military Academy at Woolwich and was commissioned a second lieutenant in the Royal Engineers in 1848 initially serving at Chatham and Scotland. In October 1851 he embarked for Ceylon and upon arrival was stationed at Trincomalee, where his assistance with defences for the harbour under Sir F Pellew was brought to the attention of the Master-General of the Ordanance by the Lords of the Admiralty. In 1853 Durnford was instrumental in saving portions of the harbour defences from destruction by fire.

Durnford volunteered for service in the Crimean War but was not accepted. In 1855 he took on civil in addition to military duties, being appointed Assistant Commissioner of Roads and Civil Engineer to the Colony. He was transferred in 1856 to Malta as an intermediate posting, but did not see active service either in the Crimea or in the Sepoy Mutiny of 1857. He served in Malta as an adjutant until February 1858, when he was promoted to Second Captain and posted back to Chatham and Aldershot in England. Between 1861 and 1864 Durnford commanded No. 27 Field Company, Royal Engineers, at Gibraltar.

In 1864, promoted to captain, he was transferred to China, but was invalided back to England while in transit due to heat apoplexy. After his recovery, Durnford spent the next six years at Devonport and Dublin on routine garrison duties. In 1871 he received a posting to South Africa.

== South African duty ==
On 23 January 1872, he arrived in Cape Town, still never having seen active service. He was, however, promoted to major on 5 July 1872 and lieutenant-colonel on 11 December 1873.

Of the 16 months following his arrival in the Cape, Durnford spent the greater portion at King William's Town. In a letter to his mother he wrote of the blacks: ″...they are at least honest, chivalrous and hospitable, true to their salt, although only barbarians. They are fine men, very naked and all that sort of thing, but thoroughly good fellows.″ He appears to have adhered to this view throughout the remaining years of his life.

He was later stationed at Pietermaritzburg, where he was befriended by Bishop Colenso, and he joined Theophilus Shepstone on an expedition to crown King Cetshwayo. Durnford had a close relationship with the bishop's daughter Frances Ellen Colenso. His marriage, though in a poor state, meant that they remained only close friends. Miss Colenso later wrote two books in support of his military reputation, My Chief and I (1880) and History of the Zulu Wars (1880).

Durnford saw some action in pursuit of Langalibalele at Bushman's River Pass (3 November 1873), where he showed great courage. During the skirmish, Durnford received two assegai stabs, one in his side, the other in his elbow; severing a nerve thus paralysing his left under-arm and hand for the rest of his life. Durnford managed to shoot two of his assailants with his revolver and to extricate himself. His Natal Carbineers had abandoned him, but his loyal Basuto troopers stood by him.

In 1878 Durnford, as the senior Royal Engineer officer in the colony, served on Sir Henry Bulwer's Boundary Commission to investigate the disputed border between the Transvaal and the Zulu Kingdom. Later that year he was given the task of planning the formation of an African auxiliary force which soon became the Natal Native Contingent (NNC).

== Anglo-Zulu War ==
He was one of the most experienced officers of the Anglo-Zulu War --"commanding presence, untiring energy and undoubted powers of leadership", he was also apt to be headstrong, and was threatened with loss of command by Lord Chelmsford. Assigned to lead the No. 2 Column of Chelmsford's invasion army, Durnford commanded a mixed force of African troops including the Natal Native Horse and a detachment of the 1st Regiment Natal Native Contingent.

On 20 January, Durnford's force was ordered to Rorke's Drift to support Chelmsford's column. That evening, a portion of the No. 2 Column under Durnford arrived at Rorke's Drift and camped on the Zulu bank, where it remained through the next day.

Late on the evening of 21 January, Durnford was ordered to Isandlwana, as was a small detachment of No. 5 Field Company, Royal Engineers, commanded by Lieutenant John Chard, which had arrived on the 19th to repair the pontoons which bridged the Buffalo River. Chard rode ahead of his detachment to Isandlwana on the morning of 22 January to clarify his orders, but was sent back to Rorke's Drift with only his wagon and its driver to construct defensive positions for the expected reinforcement company, passing Durnford's column en route in the opposite direction.

Around 10:30 am on the morning of 22 January, Durnford arrived from Rorke's Drift with five troops of the Natal Native horse and a rocket battery. A Royal Engineer, Durnford (as a Brevet Colonel and substantive Lt.-Col.) was superior in rank to Brevet Lt.-Col. Henry Pulleine, who had been left in control of the camp, and by tradition would have assumed command. Durnford did not over-rule Pulleine's dispositions, however, and after lunch he quickly decided to take the initiative and move forward to engage a Zulu force which Pulleine and Durnford judged to be moving against Chelmsford's rear. Durnford asked for a company of the 24th, but Pulleine was reluctant to agree, since his orders had been specifically to defend the camp.

== Durnford's last stand ==
Durnford was killed during the resulting battle, and was later criticised for taking men out of the camp thus weakening its defence. His policy was, in effect, to ride to the sound of the guns, "and attack the Zulu wherever they appeared". He was well respected by his native Basutos. Moreover, the actions of Durnford and his command effectively halted the left horn of the Zulu army until their cartridge boxes began to run dry. This was no small accomplishment considering the Left Horn included the inGobamakhosi regiment, "The Benders of the Kings". Their ammunition supply expended, Durnford and his troopers fought their way back to the "saddle" that separated the wagon park from the rest of the camp. In one last valiant effort, Durnford, after ordering his native troopers to escape, perished with a mixed group of colonial volunteers, members of the Natal Mounted Police and infantrymen of the 24th Foot that had held open the only escape route. Durnford's body was later found lying near a wagon, surrounded by the bodies of his men.

Among the causes of the disaster were the ill-defined relationship between Durnford and Pulleine, brought about by failures of Lord Chelmsford's command and control, a lack of good intelligence on the size and location of Zulu forces which resulted in Chelmsford splitting his force and, most decidedly, Chelmsford's decision not to fortify the camp (which was in direct violation of his own standing pre-campaign orders).

== Popular culture ==
In the 1979 film Zulu Dawn, which depicted the battle of Isandlwana, Durnford was portrayed by Burt Lancaster.
