= Henry Curling =

British Army officer (1847–1910)

Henry Thomas Curling
- Born: 27 July 1847; Ramsgate, England
- Died: 1 January 1910 (aged 62); Ramsgate, England
- Burial place: Ramsgate cemetery 51°34.264′N 1°42.107′W
- Military career
- Allegiance: United Kingdom
- Branch: British Army
- Service years: 1868–1902
- Rank: Colonel
- Unit: Royal Artillery
- Commands: CO Royal Artillery in Egypt
- Conflicts: Anglo-Zulu war: Battle of Isandlwana
- Other work: Justice of the Peace

Colonel Henry Thomas Curling (27 July 1847 – 1 January 1910) was a Royal Artillery officer of the British Army who served between 1868 and 1902. He fought in the Anglo-Zulu war and during the Battle of Isandlwana was one of only a few British officers to survive; in fact he was the only British front line survivor. Afterwards he wrote a dramatic report on the battle and several letters home that described it further. After the Zulu war he saw service in Afghanistan, Aldershot and Egypt. The letters he wrote during the Zulu war were posthumously published in the book The Curling letters of the Zulu War: "there was an awful slaughter" (2001) co-authored by Adrian Greaves and Brian Best.

== Early life ==
Henry Curling was born on 27 July 1847 in Ramsgate, Kent, England, the son of Dr Henry Curling and Mary Ann (née Warwick). He was educated at Marlborough College and then the Royal Military Academy at Woolwich before being commissioned into the Royal Artillery in 1868.

== Military career ==
Curling joined the Royal Artillery on 15 July 1868 as a lieutenant and ten years later he was sent to South Africa with N Battery of the 5th Brigade. When the Anglo-Zulu war was declared in January 1879 the 5th Brigade was a part of the central column of the invasion force which set up their camp near the lion shaped hill called Isandlwana on the 20th. In the early hours of the 22 January the General Officer Commanding Lord Chelmsford decided to split his forces in order to chase what turned out to be a Zulu decoy. Only two of the RA guns were left in camp under the charge of Major Stuart Smith and Lieutenant Curling. Having spent much of the morning turned out in a defensive position they returned to the camp at 11 am only to be sent back out at 12 where they came immediately into action against a large body of Zulus about 3–4 thousand yards away. Soon the infantry were sent to meet the enemy but, unable to slow their approach they were quickly ordered back.

Before we could get away, the enemy were by the guns, and I saw one gunner stabbed as he was mounting on to an axle-tree box. The limber gunners did not mount but ran after the guns. We went straight through the camp but found the enemy in possession. The gunners were all stabbed going through the camp, with the exception of one or two.

Unable to take the road to Rorke's Drift, Curling and Smith followed a crowd of natives in an attempt to save the guns; however, the only escape route was down a steep ravine in which the guns became stuck fast. Zulus were amongst the crowd trying to escape and were relentlessly killing so they left the guns. Major Smith was killed some time later during the flight as they climbed down a cliff but Curling was able to cross the Buffalo river safely, his horse swimming with three or four men hanging on to it. He was one of only five British officers to survive the Battle of Isandlwana of which Captain Edward Essex and Lieutenant Horace Smith-Dorrien were transport officers; Lieutenant Alan Gardener was a staff officer who was sent to the camp with orders during the battle only to find it destroyed; and Lieutenant William Cochrane was running an errand for his CO when the camp was overrun. Thus Curling was therefore the only front line officer to survive.

After the Zulu war he was promoted to captain on 16 August 1879 in charge of C Battery, 3rd Brigade based in Kabul, Afghanistan, then on 6 February 1885 gained his Majority whilst serving at Aldershot Command. Finally he was given command of the Royal Artillery in Egypt as a Lieutenant colonel (promoted 4 January 1895).

== Retirement and death ==
Colonel Curling retired in 1902 to his home town of Ramsgate where he died on 1 January 1910. Many of his friends only learned about his daring escape from Isandlwana after his death.

== Sources ==
- Best, Brian; Curling, Henry; Greaves, Adrian (2001). The Curling letters of the Zulu War: "there was an awful slaughter". Leo Cooper.
- Greaves, Adrian (2011). Isandlwana: How the Zulus humbled the British Empire. South Yorkshire: Pen & Sword Military Ltd. ISBN 978-1-84884-532-9.
- Knight, Ian (2002). Isandlwana 1879: The Great Zulu Victory. Osprey. ISBN 1-84176-511-2.
- War Office, UK (27 January 1879), written at Helpmekaar, South Africa, Zulu War: Reports, statements and proceedings of Court of Enquiry into battle at Isandhlwana, Rorke's Drift. (Original documents), vol. WO 32/7726, United Kingdom: National Archives
