= Battles of Isandhlwana and Rorke's Drift =

The battles of Isandhlwana and Rorke's Drift were two related engagements of the Zulu War:

- The battle of Isandhlwana, January 22, 1879
- The battle of Rorke's Drift, January 22 to January 23, 1879
