= InDuna =

Zulu title

iNduna (plural: iziNduna) is a Zulu/Xhosa title meaning advisor, great leader, ambassador, headman or commander of a group of warriors. It can also mean spokesperson or mediator, as the iziNduna often acted as a bridge between the people and the king. The title was reserved for senior officials appointed by the king or chief and was awarded to individuals held in high esteem for their qualities of leadership, bravery or service to the community. The iziNduna would regularly gather for an indaba to discuss important issues. In other Bantu cultures in South Africa, Nduna it is a male title given to the political representative of the Monarch either a King or Chief. Most Ndunas serves as Royal Councillors. They are succeeded by their eldest son. Bantu Tribal customs force Ndunas to marry women from noble houses. Alliance amongst the Ndunas was through arranged marriages. Reigning Monarchs also married their daughters to Ndunas for political support. Powerful Ndunas rule over large territories. They have villages and towns named after them. In today's proper English term Induna would be a Duke. Ndunankulu it's Grand Duke serving as Prime Minister of the Tribal Nation. Chief Mangosuthu Buthelezi perfected the role for the Zulu Nation . Bapedi Royal Family named Ngoako Ramatlhodi as their Traditional Prime Minister. They call him Tonakgolo ya Sechaba sa Bapedi.

Amongst the Ndebele the term was also used to collectively refer to a group of elite soldiers operating under a specific induna. Among the Lozi, Induna led Makolo, which were groups of men corresponding to territories, who served as armies or labourers.

The term has found widespread use in South African English and Afrikaans, and it is a common reference to boss or lead person. In modern times the terms Chairperson and induna are sometimes used interchangeably.

== Notable izinDuna in history ==
- Leander Starr Jameson, a British physician, was awarded the title of iNduna by the Matabele chief Lobengula after he had successfully treated the chief's gout.
- Mbopa was an iNduna serving under Shaka. He was one of the main conspirators in Shaka's assassination by his half-brothers Dingane and Umhlangana.
- Ndlela kaSompisi was a key general to Zulu Kings Shaka and Dingane, and also served as Dingane's inDuna – his chief advisor. Ndlela' repeatedly defied Dingane's request that he assassinate Mpande, half-brother of Shaka and Dingane. By this refusal he preserved the blood line of the Zulu monarchy, as all subsequent Zulu kings were from Mpande's blood line. He was strangled to death for his insubordination.
- Ntshingwayo kaMahole was the second in command (inDuna) of King Cetshwayo's Army. He was the commanding general who defeated the encamped British Army at the Battle of Isandlwana.
- Nathaniel Isaacs, a British adventurer, was awarded the title inDuna Incoola (Principal Chief of Natal) by Shaka and was granted large tracts of land.
- Tinos Rusere, nicknamed the "Rhodesian Induna", was an elected trade union representative of the Rhodesian miners in South Africa. In 1977 he became the trade union inDuna for all Southern African countries.
- Joseph Leabua Jonathan worked as a mine inDuna (foreman) at Brakpan and eventually became the first Prime Minister of Lesotho.
- The Sudwala Caves were named after the Swazi inDuna Sudwala.
- David Livingstone was given authority as a "nduna" in 1852 by Sekeletu, chief of the Kololo, to lead a joint expedition investigating trade routes, starting at Linyanti on the Zambezi river and reaching Luanda on the Atlantic before returning and continuing downstream to Quelimane on the Indian Ocean.

== Induna used as name ==
The word Induna is regularly used as a name to indicate something large (the big one) or important:

- Ntabazinduna (Mountain of the Chiefs) is the name of a hill north of Bulawayo, Zimbabwe. The name stems from the practice of throwing izinDuna who ran afoul of the king down it.
- Induna was the name of a racehorse that won the 1930 South Australian Derby.
- Canada's largest crocodile (14 feet long, weighing more than 1000 pounds) is called Induna. It resides at the Reptilia (zoo) in Vaughan, Ontario.

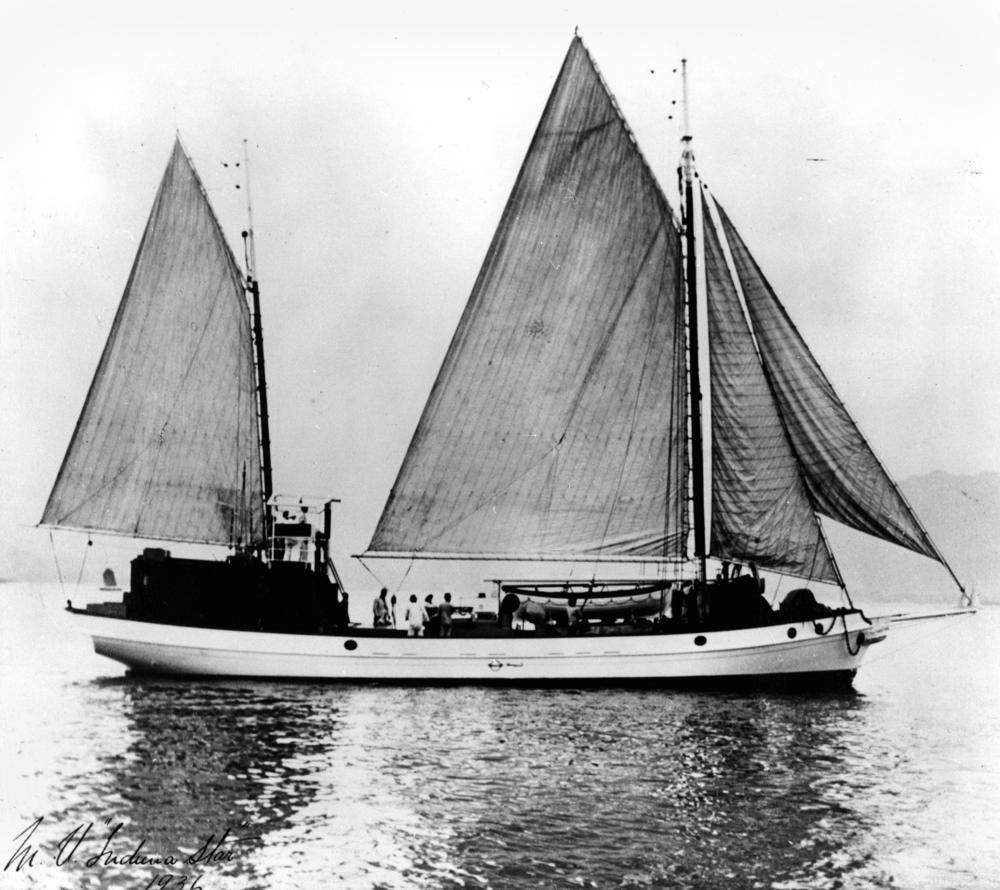
MV Induna Star

- In 1899 Winston Churchill (a young war correspondent at the time) escaped from a prison in Pretoria and rode the Induna (a weekly steamer, built in 1891 at Aberdeen, UK) from Delagoa Bay to Durban.
- The SS Induna was the name of a British merchant steamboat (5086BRT) that was sunk during WW2. It was built in 1925 by A. Stephen & Sons Ltd. of Glasgow and torpedoed by the German U-boat Friedrich-Karl Marks (U-376) en route from Reykjavík to Murmansk. Of the 66 people on board, 28 survived and were picked up by a Soviet minesweeper.
- The MV Induna Star was an 81-ton Australian steel ketch. It was captured by the Japanese during WW2 and the men aboard were incarcerated. Some of those men later died in the infamous sinking of the prison ship, the Montevideo Maru by a US submarine.
- Canadian designer John William Allen registered Induna Art & Design Inc. in 2004 formalizing the name used since 1984.

== See also ==
- Zulu people (ethnic group)
- Xhosa people (ethnic group)
- Languages of South Africa
