= Ntshingwayo Khoza =

Zulu warrior and leader (1809–1883)

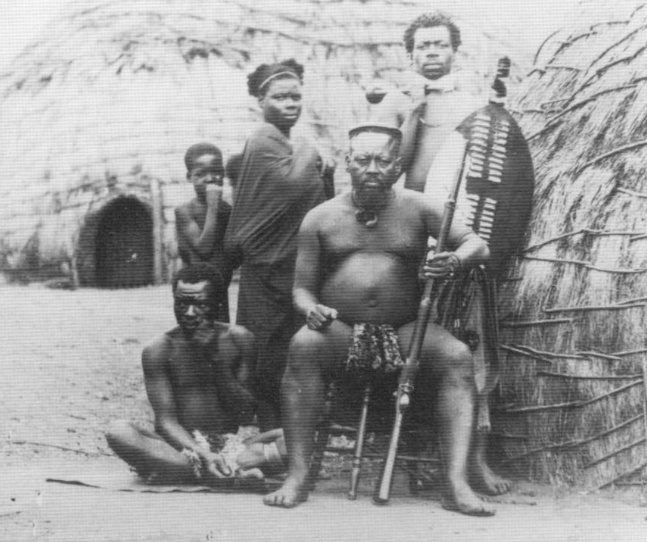
- One of only two photographs known to exist of Ntshingwayo kaMahole. Taken at his kraal during the First Anglo-Zulu War of 1879.
- Born: c. 1809
- Died: 21 July 1883 (aged 72 or 73 years old) oNdini, Zululand
- Military career
- Allegiance: Zulu Kingdom
- Rank: inDuna
- Commands: Impi
- Conflicts: Anglo-Zulu War: Battle of Isandlwana

Ntshingwayo kaMahole of the Khoza (c. 1809 – 21 July 1883) was the commanding general (inDuna) of King Cetshwayo's Zulu Army during the first Anglo-Zulu War.

== Anglo-Zulu War ==
Ntshingwayo was given overall field command of the Zulu impi against the centre column of the first British expeditionary force to invade Zululand in the Anglo-Zulu War of 1879. He was given conflicting orders. Publicly, he was told to meet the British expeditionary force's centre column in open battle "and eat them up" [kill them], but privately he was commanded by Cetshwayo "not to go to the English at once [to attack], but to hold a conference first and send some chiefs to the English to ask why they were laying the country waste and killing Zulus". Despite this, Ntshingwayo successfully outmanoeuvred Lt Gen Lord Chelmsford in the field. Chelmsford had split the British expeditionary force, sending out a large part of his forces on patrols from the main British camp at Isandlwana in an effort to find the Zulu army, leaving the camp poorly defended and unfortified. Ntshingwayo's amabutho [isiZulu: "regiments"; singular: ibutho] attacked and virtually annihilated the encamped British force in the Battle of Isandlwana on 22 January 1879. With a death toll of some 1,300 British troops, European volunteers, African soldiers and camp followers, the battle proved to be one of the worst defeat suffered by the British Army during the Victorian era.

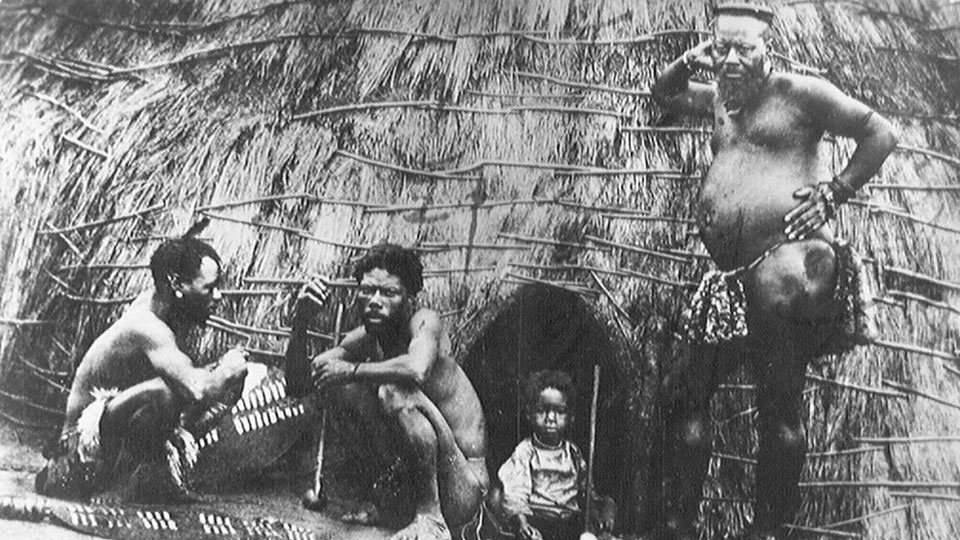
This is a photograph of a postcard published around the time of the Anglo-Zulu War of 1879. It is one of only two known and authenticated images of the Zulu induna [general] Ntshingwayo kaMahole, who led the Zulu impis at Isandlwana. The photographer and the publisher are unknown. The original postcard is in the collection of the National Army Museum, UK.

Despite the overwhelming victory, and Ntshingwayo's competent command of the battle, the King was extremely displeased at the great number of Zulu casualties at Isandlwana. It will never be known how many casualties the Zulus suffered, but several hundred were killed and many more wounded. Modern historians suggest a total casualty figure of some 1,000 Zulus is not unreasonable. Two of Ntshingwayo's own sons who fought in the battle were badly wounded. Sishishili kaMnqandi, a royal favourite and an induna [isiZulu: "officer"] of the uKhandempemvu ibutho who the King had asked to report on the battle, placed the blame for the lack of the Zulu army's preparation and the resulting high death toll squarely at the door of Ntshingwayo. As a result, Ntshingwayo forfeited much of the public acclaim he was due for his great victory; yet the blame for the outcome is arguably King Cetshwayo's, since he gave conflicting orders to Ntshingwayo to not attack the British force until future negotiations had failed. In the event, the Zulu surprise was so complete that they had little choice but to engage the British where they found them on the field.

== Post-War period ==
After King Cetshwayo's return to Zululand from captivity in Cape Town and England, many of his most loyal supporters gathered to greet him, including Ntshingwayo kaMahole. The King's return was divisive, causing a polarisation between the royalist (uSuthu) and anti-royalist factions. Many of his followers launched an attack on Prince Zibhebhu kaMaphitha of the Mandlakazi collateral Zulu royal family branch, who had oppressed Cetshwayo's followers during the King's absence. Zibhebhu was an iqawe [isiZulu: "renowned warrior", "hero"], a veteran of Isandlwana who led the Zulu reserve which accounted for many of the British casualties in the battle, and proved to be the most prominent Zulu general since Shaka. He lured the attacking uSuthu into a trap and defeated them in an ambush in the Msebe valley. In fear for his safety, the King called up his old amabutho, veterans of Isandlwana. Amongst them was Ntshingwayo. This was a flagrant violation of the British laws enforced in Zululand in the wake of the war and which firmly prohibited any raising of Zulu forces.

On 21 July 1883, Zibhebhu launched a surprise attack on the royal homestead of King Cetshwayo at oNdini (near present day Ulundi) which was undergoing renovations at the time. Seasoned amabutho of Isandlwana met Zibhebhu in open battle, but they were soundly defeated. Hundreds were trapped in the homestead and slain, including Ntshingwayo's siblings Hayiyana and Makhoba. In the incident the king was himself wounded by a spear and fled the scene of the bloody coup. Ntshingwayo was one of the King's many senior induna who were run down and killed as they tried to escape, along with Ntshingwayo's childhood friend Godide Ndlela. oNdini was razed to the ground.

The great irony is that the victorious general of Isandlwana was himself killed by a fellow veteran of the battle. Today Ntshingwayo's role in the Battle of Isandlwana has been emphasized in South African historiography.
