= Frances Colenso =

English historian (1849–1887)

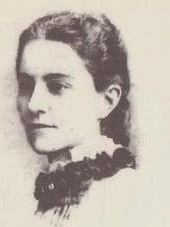
- from her books
- Born: 30 May 1849; Forncett, Norfolk, England
- Died: 28 April 1887 (aged 37); Ventnor, England
- Occupation: Writer

Frances Ellen Colenso (30 May 1849 – 28 April 1887) was an English historian of the Zulu Wars.

== Life ==
Colenso was born in Forncett in Norfolk in 1849. Her father was John Colenso and her mother was Frances Colenso. She was known as "Fanny" by her family and friends. Colenso was educated at the John Ruskin inspired Winnington Hall until 1864 before attending the Slade School of Art. She wrote and aspired to be an artist.

Lieutenant-Colonel Anthony Durnford was stationed at Pietermaritzburg in 1873 where he was befriended by her father. Durnford had a close relationship with Colenso. Though Durnford and his wife lived separate lives, the fact that he was married meant that he and Frances could only be close friends. After Durnford's death at the Battle of Isandlwana, Frances Colenso with Durnford's brother wrote two books exculpating Anthony Durnford from responsibility for that British defeat by the Zulus: My Chief and I (1880); History of the Zulu Wars (1880).

Frances also campaigned for the Zulu people suffering under the British-imposed break-up of the Zulu nation following the end of the Zulu War.

Bishop Colenso, Frances's father, died in June 1883 and her elder sister Harriet became the de facto head of the family. Frances published two books on the Zulus and the British (History of the Zulu War and Its Origin in 1880 and The Ruin of Zululand in 1885) that explained events in Zululand from a pro-Zulu perspective. The books were not popular and Harriet is thought to have had a guiding hand in their production.

Colenso developed tuberculosis after nursing an infected soldier in Natal. She spent her final days being treated for tuberculosis in Ventnor, where she died, possibly of a heart attack, and is buried.

== In popular culture ==
- In the 1979 film Zulu Dawn, Colenso is portrayed by Anna Calder-Marshall.
