= Battle of Isandlwana =

1879 Anglo-Zulu War battle

- Part of the Anglo-Zulu War
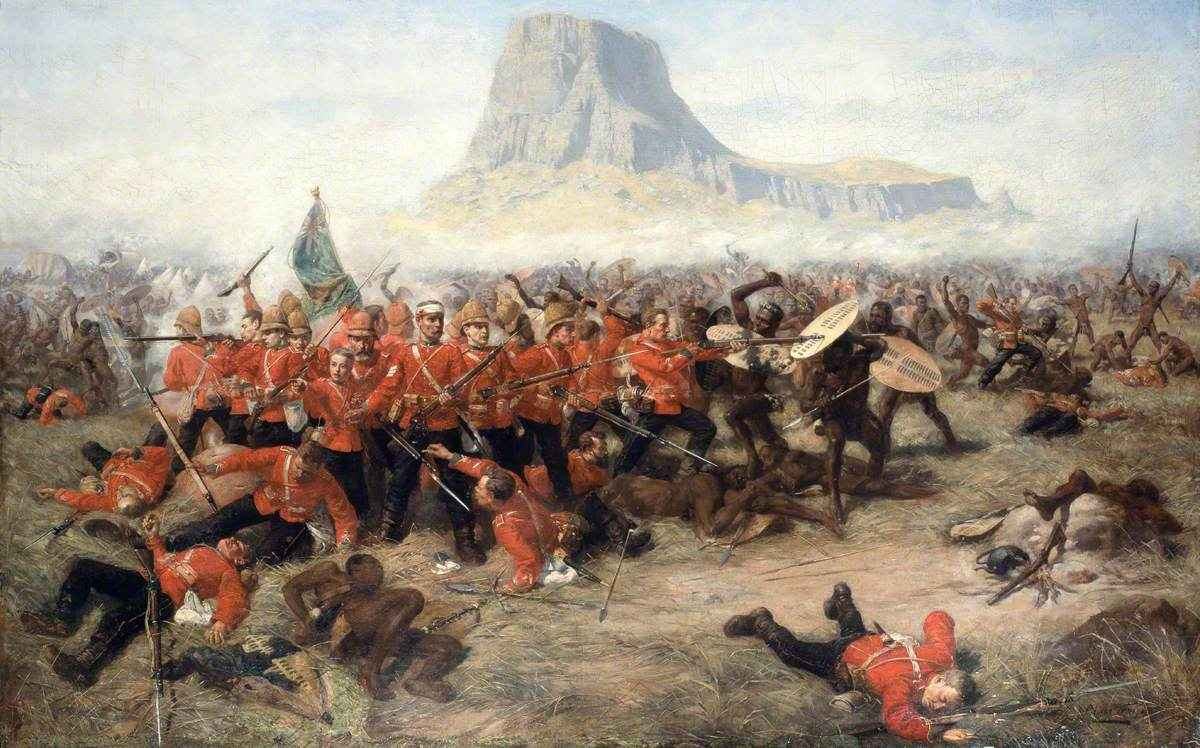
- The Last Stand at Isandlwana by Charles Edwin Fripp
Date	22 January 1879
Location	Isandlwana, Zulu Kingdom 28°21′23″S 30°39′9″E
Result	Zulu victory

Belligerents
United Kingdom	Zulu Kingdom

Commanders and leaders
Overall commander: Maj. Gen. Lord Chelmsford; Subordinate commanders: (United Kingdom of Great Britain and Ireland) Bvt. Lt. Col. Henry Pulleine † (United Kingdom of Great Britain and Ireland) Col. Anthony Durnford †	Overall commander: Ntshingwayo kaMahole Khoza; Dabulamanzi kaMpande; Subordinate commanders: Vumindaba kaNthati; Mavumengwana kaNdlela; Zibhebhu kaMaphitha

Units involved
British Army	Impi

Strength
No. 2 Column: 525; British: 14; Native + Colonial: c. 511; No. 3 Column: 1,312; British: 734; Native + Colonial: c. 578; Total: 1,837 men (Note: In addition to the troops above, an indeterminate number of civilian auxiliaries (wagon drivers, servants, etc.) were also present)	Zulu Impi: about 20,000–25,000 c. 10,000 to 15,000 engaged Reserve: 3,000 to 5,000 to Rorke's Drift

Casualties and losses
Total: 1,300+ killed: 52 officers; 690 British regulars; 476 others including: 343 African Natal Native Contingent; 133 European Colonial troops; Material losses: 2 artillery pieces captured	Total: 3,000–5,000: c. 1,000–3,000 killed; 2,000 wounded
- Location of Isandlwana in present-day South Africa Battle of Isandlwana (KwaZulu-Natal)

The Battle of Isandlwana or Isandhlwana on 22 January 1879 was the second major encounter in the Anglo-Zulu War between the British Empire and the Zulu Kingdom – the Battle of Nyezane having been fought and won earlier on the same day by Colonel Pearson's Coastal Column. Eleven days after the British invaded the Zulu Kingdom in Southern Africa, a Zulu force of some 20,000 warriors attacked a portion of the British main column consisting of approximately 1,800 British, colonial and native troops with approximately 350 civilians. The Zulus were equipped mainly with the traditional assegai iron spears and cow-hide shields, but also had a number of muskets and antiquated rifles.

The British and colonial troops were armed with the modern Martini–Henry breechloading rifle and two 7-pounder mountain guns deployed as field guns, as well as a Hale rocket battery. The Zulus had a vast disadvantage in weapons technology, but they greatly outnumbered the British and ultimately overwhelmed them, killing over 1,300 troops, including all those out on the forward firing line. The British were unprepared for the attack from the large Zulu contingent, which had moved quickly, and were attacked along the flanks by the Zulus using their traditional 'horns and chest of the buffalo' formation. The Zulu army suffered anywhere from 1,000 to 3,000 killed.

The battle was a victory for the Zulus and caused the defeat of the first British invasion of Zululand. The British Army had suffered its worst defeat against an indigenous foe equipped with vastly inferior military technology. Isandlwana resulted in the British taking a much more aggressive approach in the Anglo-Zulu War, leading to a heavily reinforced second invasion, and the destruction of King Cetshwayo's hopes of a negotiated peace.

== Background ==
Following the scheme by which Lord Carnarvon had brought about the Confederation of Canada through the 1867 British North America Act, it was thought that a similar plan might succeed in South Africa and in 1877 Sir Henry Bartle Frere was appointed as High Commissioner for Southern Africa to instigate the scheme. Some of the obstacles to such a plan were the presence of the independent states of the South African Republic and the Kingdom of Zululand, both of which the British Empire would attempt to overcome by force of arms.

Bartle Frere, on his own initiative, without the approval of the British government and with the intent of instigating a war with the Zulu, had presented an ultimatum to the Zulu king Cetshwayo on 11 December 1878 with which the Zulu king could not possibly comply. When the ultimatum expired a month later, Bartle Frere ordered Lord Chelmsford to proceed with an invasion of Zululand, for which plans had already been made.

== Prelude ==
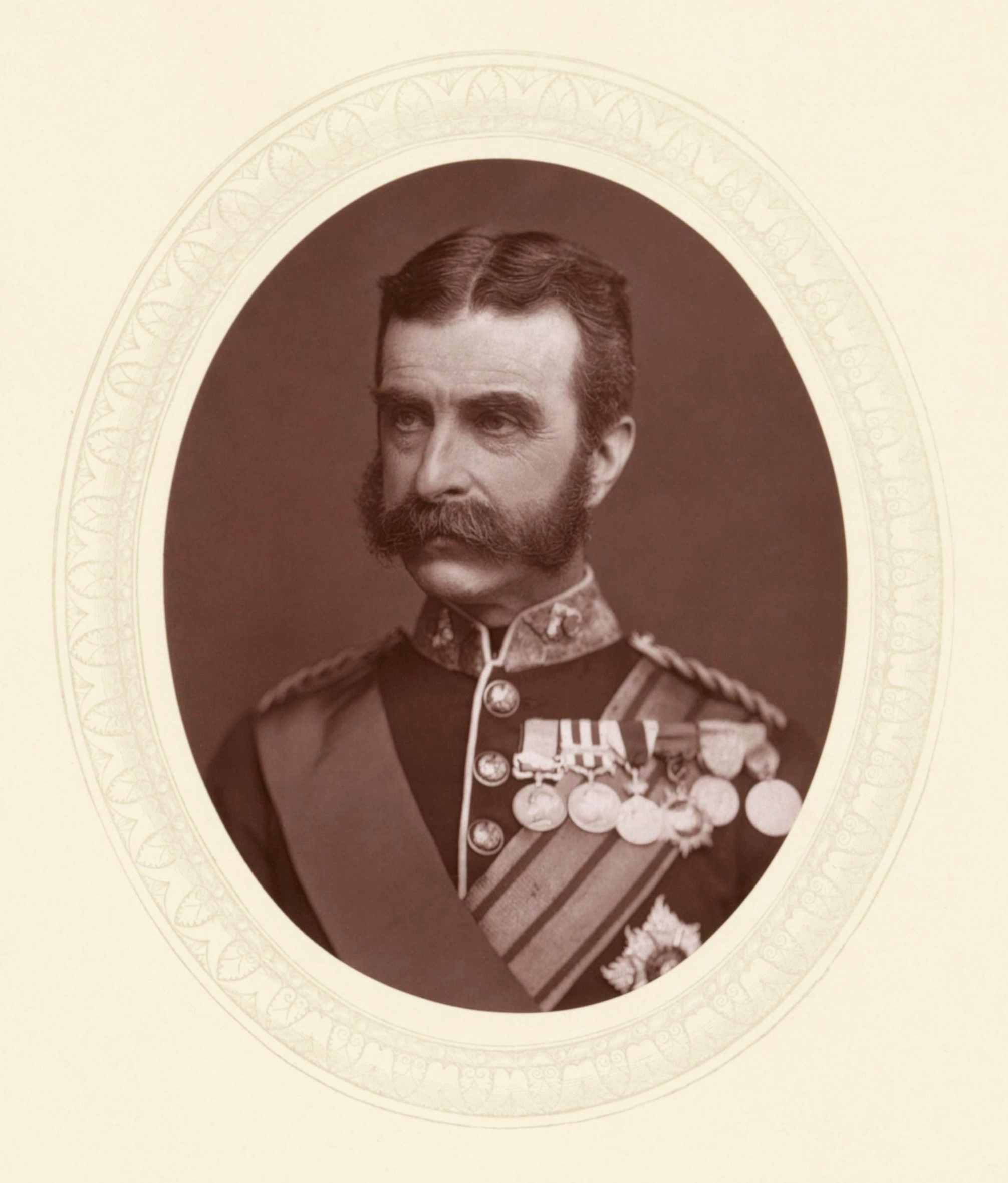
Lord Chelmsford

Lord Chelmsford, the Commander-in-Chief of British forces during the war, initially planned a five-pronged invasion of Zululand consisting of over 17,000 troops in five columns and designed to encircle the Zulu army and force it to fight as he was concerned that the Zulus would avoid battle, slip around the British and over the Tugela, and strike at Natal. Lord Chelmsford settled on three invading columns with the main centre column, now consisting of over 8,500 men, under his direct command. The centre column comprised No. 3 Column, commanded by Colonel Richard Thomas Glyn, and Colonel Anthony Durnford's No. 2 Column. Chelmsford moved his troops from Pietermaritzburg to a forward camp at Helpmekaar, past Greytown. On 9 January 1879 they moved to Rorke's Drift, and early on 11 January commenced crossing the Buffalo River into Zululand.

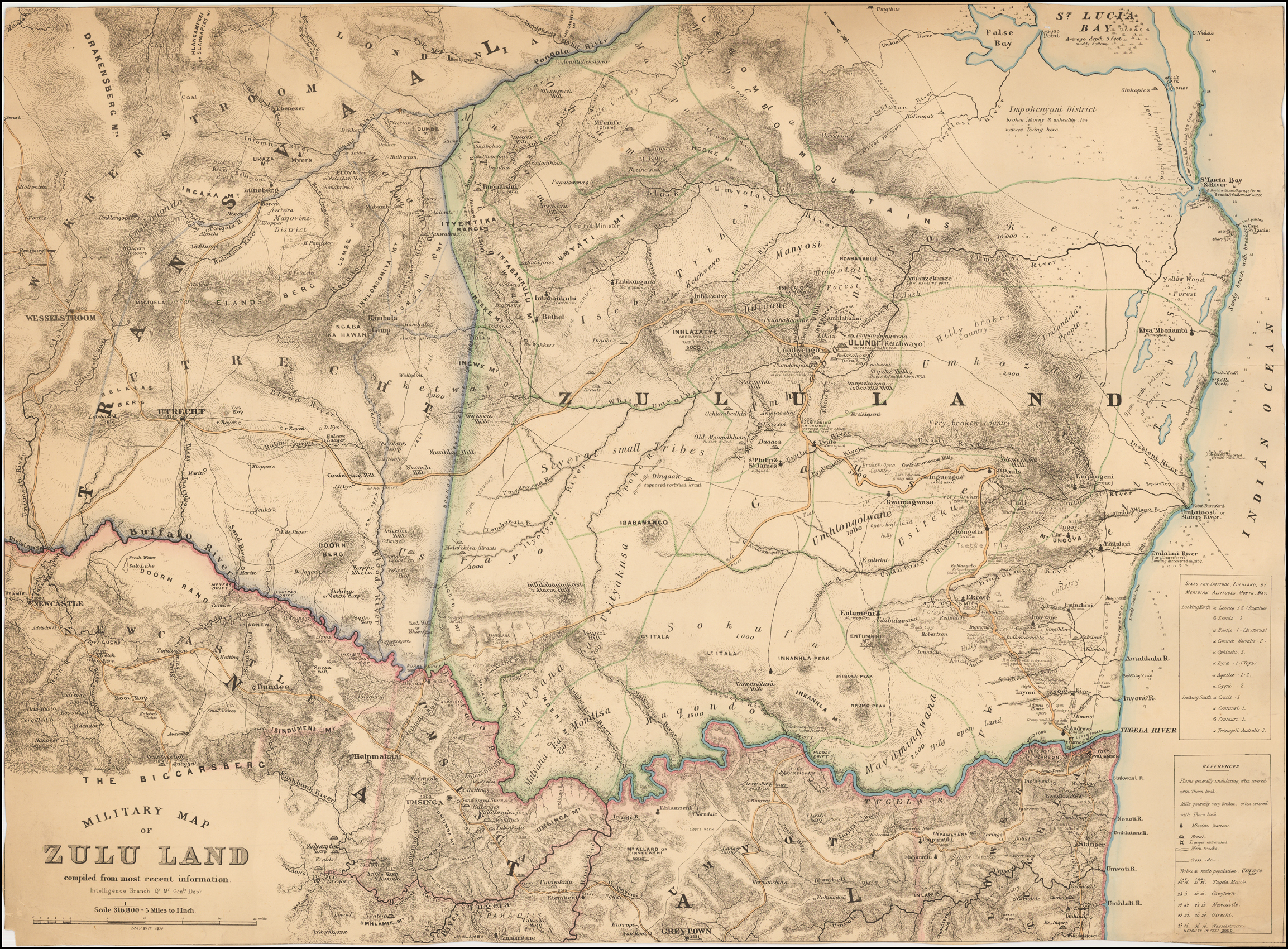
British Army "Military Map of Zulu Land", 1879. Rorke's Drift is at the convergence of the red, green and blue border lines, Islandlwana is slightly to the right

The backbone of the British force under Lord Chelmsford consisted of twelve regular infantry companies: six each of the 1st and 2nd Battalions, the 24th Regiment of Foot (which was subsequently renamed the South Wales Borderers). These were regarded as hardened and reliable troops. In addition, there were approximately 2,500 local African auxiliaries of the Natal Native Contingent, many of whom were exiled or refugee Zulu. They were led by European officers, but were considered generally of poor quality by the British as they were prohibited from using their traditional fighting technique and inadequately trained in the European method as well as being indifferently armed. Also, there were some irregular colonial cavalry units, and a detachment of artillery consisting of six field guns and two Hale rocket troughs. Adding on wagon drivers, camp followers and servants, there were around 4,700 men in the No. 3 Column, and over 3,800 men in the No. 2 Column that composed the main centre column. Colonel Anthony Durnford took charge of No. 2 Column with orders to stay on the defensive near the Middle Drift of the Tugela River. Because of the urgency required to accomplish their scheme, Bartle Frere and Chelmsford began the invasion during the rainy season. This had the consequence of slowing the British advance to a crawl.

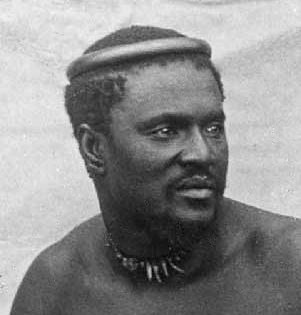
Cetshwayo, c. 1875

The Zulu army, while a product of a warrior culture, was essentially a militia force which could be called out in time of national danger. It had a very limited logistical capacity and could only stay in the field a few weeks before the troops would be obliged to return to their civilian duties. Zulu warriors were armed primarily with assegai thrusting spears, known in Zulu as iklwa, knobkierrie clubs, some throwing spears and shields made of cowhide. The Zulu warrior, his regiment and the army drilled in the personal and tactical use and coordination of this weapons system. Some Zulus also had old muskets and antiquated rifles stockpiled, a relatively few of which were carried by Zulu impi. However, their marksmanship was very poor, quality and supply of powder and shot dreadful, maintenance non-existent and attitude towards firearms summed up in the observation that: "The generality of Zulu warriors, however, would not have firearms – the arms of a coward, as they said, for they enable the poltroon to kill the brave without awaiting his attack." The British had timed the invasion to coincide with the harvest, intending to catch the Zulu warrior-farmers dispersed. Fortunately for Cetshwayo, the Zulu army had already begun to assemble at Ulundi, as it did every year for the First Fruits ceremony when all warriors were duty-bound to report to their regimental barracks near Ulundi.

Cetshwayo sent the 24,000 strong main Zulu impi from near present-day Ulundi, on 17 January, across the White Umfolozi River with the following command to his warriors: "March slowly, attack at dawn and eat up the red soldiers."

On 18 January, some 4,000 warriors, under the leadership of Mavumengwana kaNdlela Ntuli, were detached from the main body to meet with Dabulamanzi kaMpande and attack Charles Pearson's No. 1 Column near Eshowe. The remaining 20,000 Zulus camped at the isiPhezi ikhanda. The next day, the main force arrived and camped near Babanango Mountain, then moved the next day to a camp near Siphezi Mountain. Finally, on 21 January they moved into the Ngwebeni Valley, where they remained concealed, planning to attack the British on 23 January, but they were discovered by a scouting party on 22 January. Under the command of Ntshigwayo kaMahole the Zulu army had reached its position in easy stages. It marched in two columns within sight of each other, but a few miles apart to prevent a surprise attack. They were preceded by a screening force of mounted scouts supported by parties of warriors 200–400 strong tasked with preventing the main columns from being sighted. The speed of the Zulu advance compared to the British was marked. The Zulu impi had advanced over 80 km (50 mi) in five days, while Chelmsford had only advanced slightly over 16 km (9.9 mi) in 10 days.

The British under Chelmsford pitched camp at Isandlwana on 20 January, but did not follow standing orders to entrench. No laager (circling of the wagons) was formed. Chelmsford did not see the need for one, stating, "It would take a week to make." But the chief reason for the failure to take defensive precautions appears to have been that the British command severely underestimated the Zulus' capabilities. The experience of numerous colonial wars fought in Africa was that the massed firepower of relatively small bodies of professional European troops, armed with modern firearms and artillery and supplemented by local allies and levies, would march out to meet the natives whose poorly equipped armies would put up a fight but in the end would succumb. Chelmsford believed that a force of over 4,000, including 2,000 British infantry armed with Martini–Henry rifles, as well as artillery, had more than sufficient firepower to overwhelm any attack by Zulus armed only with spears, cowhide shields and a few firearms such as Brown Bess muskets. Indeed, with a British force of this size, it was the logistical arrangements which occupied Chelmsford's thoughts. Rather than any fear that the camp might be attacked, his main concern was managing the huge number of wagons and oxen required to support his forward advance.

Once he had established the camp at Isandlwana, Chelmsford sent out two battalions of the Natal Native Contingent to scout ahead. They skirmished with elements of a Zulu force which he believed to be the vanguard of the main enemy army. Such was his confidence in British military training and firepower that he divided his force, departing the camp at dawn on January 22 with approximately 2,800 soldiers—including half of the British infantry contingent, together with around 600 auxiliaries—to find the main Zulu force with the intention of bringing them to battle so as to achieve a decisive victory, and leaving the remaining 1,300 men of the No. 3 Column to guard the camp. It never occurred to him that the Zulus he saw were diverting him from their main force.

Chelmsford left behind approximately 600 British red coat line infantry – 450 men from five companies of the 1st Battalion and one company of 150 men from the 2nd Battalion of the 24th Regiment of Foot, under the command of Brevet Lieutenant Colonel Henry Pulleine. Pulleine's orders were to defend the camp and wait for further instructions to support the general as and when called upon. Pulleine also had around 700 men composed of the Natal Native Contingent, European colonial troops, local mounted irregulars, and other units. He also had two 7-pounder guns with around 70 men of the Royal Artillery. In total, over 1,300 men and two artillery guns of the No. 3 Column were left to defend the camp excluding civilian auxiliaries.

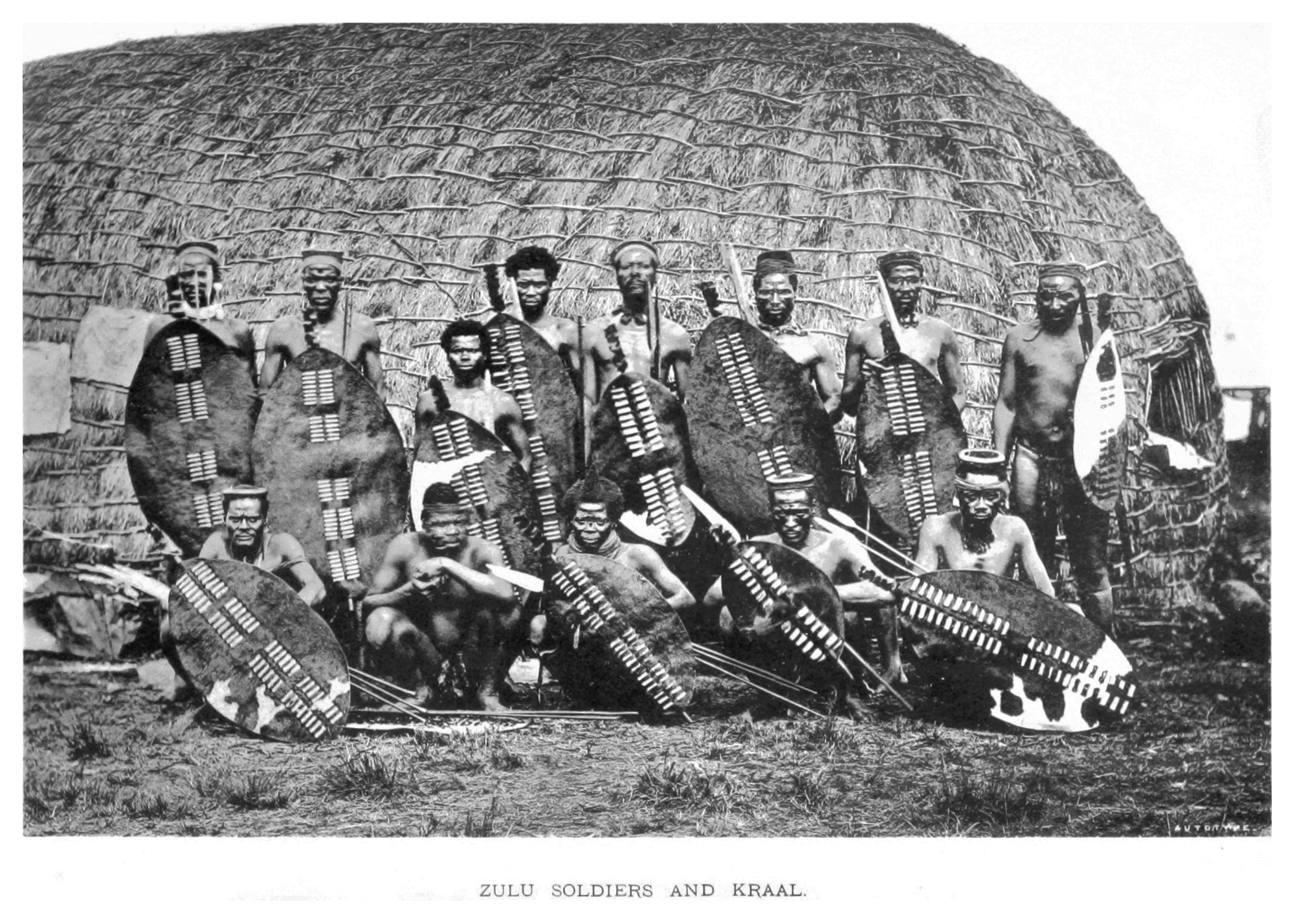
Zulu warriors, 1882

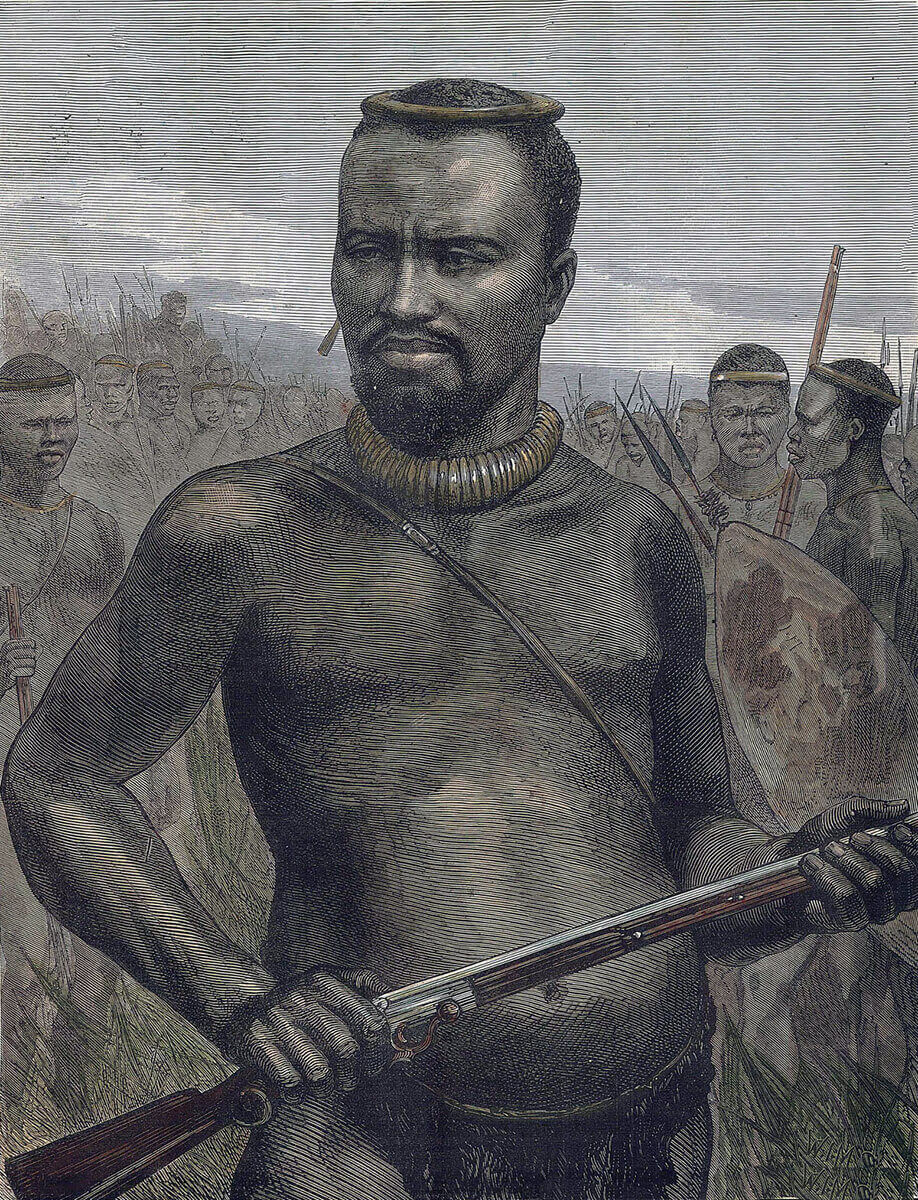
Dabulamanzi kaMpande

Pulleine, left in command of a rear position, was an administrator with no experience of front-line command on a campaign. Nevertheless, he commanded a strong force, particularly the six veteran regular infantry companies, which were experienced in colonial warfare. The mounted vedettes, cavalry scouts, patrolling some 11 km (6.8 mi) from camp reported at 7:00 am that groups of Zulus, numbering around 4,000 men, could be seen. Pulleine received further reports during the early morning, each of which noted movements, both large and small, of Zulus. There was speculation among the officers whether these troops were intending to march against Chelmsford's rear or towards the camp itself.

Around 10:30 am, Colonel Anthony Durnford, whose left arm was paralyzed from wounds sustained at Bushman's River Pass during the pursuit of Chief Langalibalele, arrived from Rorke's Drift with 500 men of the Natal Native Contingent and a rocket battery of two 9pr Hale rocket troughs of the No. 2 Column to reinforce the camp at Isandlwana. This brought the issue of command to the fore because Durnford was senior and by tradition should have assumed command. However, he did not over-rule Pulleine's dispositions and after lunch he quickly decided to take the initiative and move forward to engage a Zulu force which Pulleine and Durnford judged to be moving against Chelmsford's rear. Durnford asked for a company of the 24th, but Pulleine was reluctant to agree since his orders had been specifically to defend the camp.

Chelmsford had underestimated the disciplined, well-led, well-motivated and confident Zulus. The failure to secure an effective defensive position, the poor intelligence on the location of the main Zulu army, Chelmsford's decision to split his force in half, and the Zulus' tactical exploitation of the terrain and the weaknesses in the British formation, all combined to prove catastrophic for the troops at Isandlwana. In contrast, the Zulus responded to the unexpected discovery of their camp with an immediate and spontaneous advance. Even though the indunas lost control over the advance, the warriors' training allowed the Zulu troops to form their standard attack formation on the run, with their battle line deployed in reverse of its intended order.

== Battle ==
The Zulu Army was commanded by Umtwana (Prince) Ntshingwayo kaMahole Khoza and Umtwana Mavumengwana kaNdlela Ntuli. The inDuna Dabulamanzi kaMpande, half brother of Cetshwayo, commanded the Undi Corps after Zibhebhu kaMaphitha, the regular inkhosi, or commander, was wounded.

While Chelmsford was in the field seeking them, the entire Zulu army had outmanoeuvred him, moving behind his force with the intention of attacking the British Army on 23 January. Pulleine had received reports of large forces of Zulus throughout the morning of 22 January from 8:00am on. Vedettes had observed Zulus on the hills to the left front, and Lt. Chard, while he was at the camp, observed a large force of several thousand Zulu moving to the British left around the hill of Isandlwana. Pulleine sent word to Chelmsford, which was received by the general between 9:00 am and 10:00 am. The main Zulu force was discovered at around 11:00 am by men of Lt. Charles Raw's troop of scouts, who chased a number of Zulus into a valley, only then seeing most of the 20,000 men of the main enemy force sitting in total quiet. This valley has generally been thought to be the Ngwebeni some 7 miles (11 km) from the British camp but may have been closer in the area of the spurs of Nqutu hill. Having been discovered, the Zulu force leapt to the offensive. Raw's men began a fighting retreat back to the camp, and a messenger was sent to warn Pulleine.

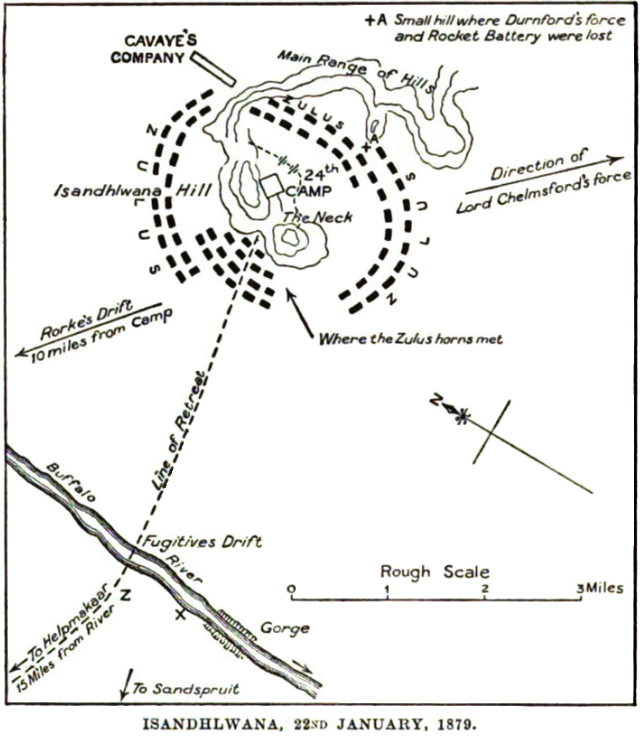
Drawing of the Battle of Isandlwana, by General Sir Horace Smith-Dorrien (1925)

The Zulu adopted their traditional pitched battle formation, known as the 'horns and chest of the buffalo', with the aim of encircling the British position. From Pulleine's vantage point in the camp, at first only the right horn and then the chest (centre) of the attack seemed to be developing. Pulleine sent out first one, then all six companies of the 24th Foot into an extended firing line, with the aim of meeting the Zulu attack head-on and checking it with firepower. Durnford's men, upon meeting elements of the Zulu centre, had retreated to a donga, a dried-out watercourse, on the British right flank where they formed a defensive line. The rocket battery, consisting of two 9pr Hale rocket troughs mounted on mules under Durnford's command, soon dropped behind the rest of the force, and, after sighting the enemy, managed to fire off three rockets before being overrun very early in the engagement.The two battalions of native troops were in Durnford's line; while all their British officers and NCOs carried rifles, only one in 10 of the native soldiers under their command had a firearm, and those few weapons were muzzle-loading muskets with limited ammunition. Many of the native troops began to leave the battlefield at this point.

Pulleine only made one change to the original disposition after about 20 minutes of firing, bringing in the companies in the firing line slightly closer to the camp. For an hour or so until after noon, the disciplined British volleys pinned down the Zulu centre, inflicting many casualties and causing the advance to stall. Indeed, morale remained high within the British line. The Martini–Henry rifle was a powerful weapon and the men were experienced. Additionally, the shell fire of the Royal Artillery forced some Zulu regiments to take cover behind the reverse slope of a hill. Nevertheless, the left horn of the Zulu advance was moving to outflank and envelop the British right. The Zulus described the turning point in the battle when an older warrior exposed himself to fire to encourage the warriors to keep fighting and said, "Don't you dare run away. Your leader, Cetshwayo, never told you to run away." He was killed and the Impis rallied and broke the British line.

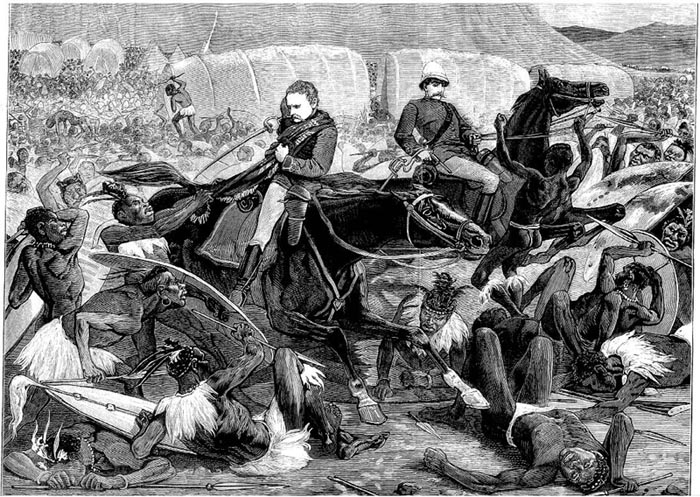
Lieutenants Melvill and Coghill escape the camp with the Queen's Colour of the 1st Battalion of the 24th Regiment

Durnford's men, who had been fighting the longest, began to withdraw and their rate of fire diminished. Durnford's withdrawal exposed the right flank of the British regulars, which, with the general threat of the Zulu encirclement, caused Pulleine to order a withdrawal back to the camp. The regulars' retreat was performed with order and discipline and the men of the 24th conducted a fighting withdrawal into the camp. Durnford's retreat, however, exposed the flank of G Company, 2nd/24th, which was overrun relatively quickly.

=== Solar eclipse ===
There was a solar eclipse on that day, at 2:30 pm. An officer in advance of Chelmsford's force gave this eyewitness account of the final stage of the battle at about 3:00 pm:

In a few seconds we distinctly saw the guns fired again, one after the other, sharp. This was done several times – a pause, and then a flash – flash! The sun was shining on the camp at the time, and then the camp looked dark, just as if a shadow was passing over it. The guns did not fire after that, and in a few minutes all the tents had disappeared.

Nearly the same moment is described in a Zulu warrior's account.

The sun turned black in the middle of the battle; we could still see it over us, or should have thought we had been fighting till evening. Then we got into the camp, and there was a great deal of smoke and firing. Afterwards the sun came out bright again.

=== Zulu victory ===
The presence of large numbers of bodies grouped together suggests the resistance was more protracted than originally thought, and a number of desperate last stands were made. Evidence shows that many of the bodies, today marked by cairns, were found in several large groups around the camp – including one stand of around 150 men. A Zulu account describes a group of the 24th forming a square on the neck of Isandlwana. Colonial cavalry, the NMP and the carabiniers, who could easily have fled as they had horses, died around Durnford in his last stand, while nearby their horses were found dead on their picket rope. What is clear is that the slaughter was complete in the area around the camp and back to Natal along the Fugitive's Drift. The fighting had been hand-to-hand combat and no quarter was given to the British wounded. The Zulus had been commanded to ignore the civilians in black coats and this meant that some officers, whose patrol dress was dark blue and black at the time, were spared and escaped.

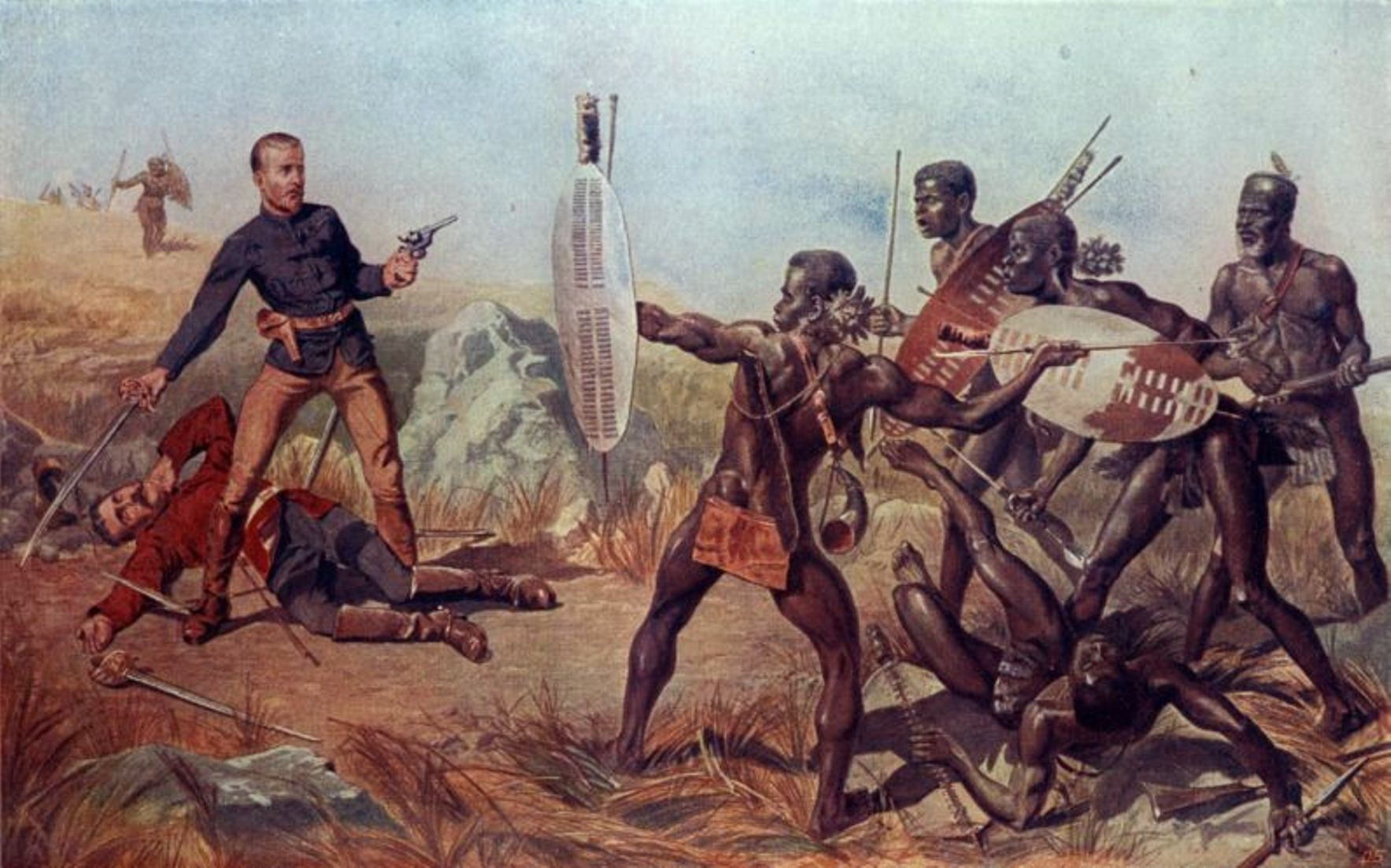
Lieutenants Melvill and Coghill attacked by Zulu warriors

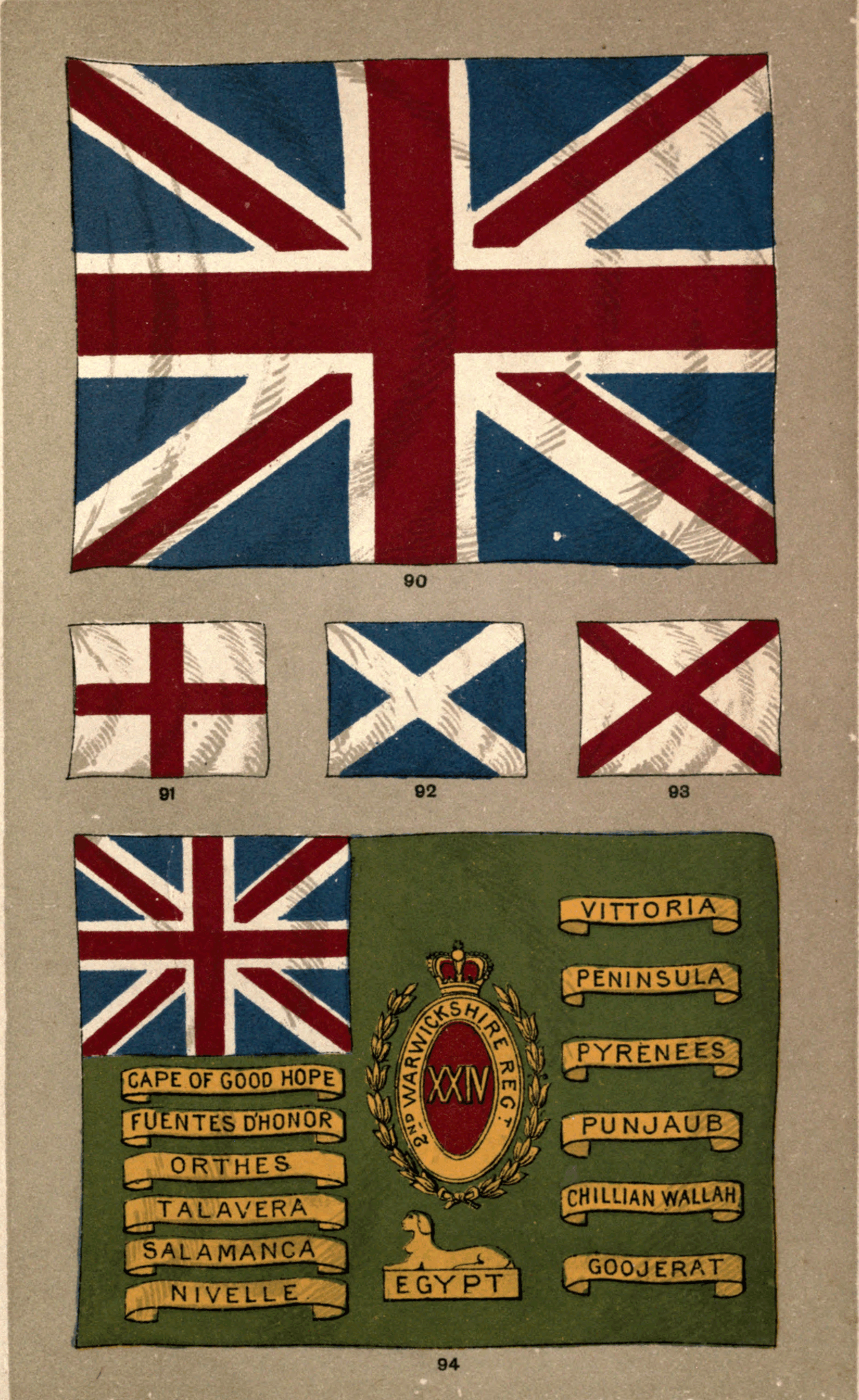
#94 the flag of the 24th Regiment (2nd Warwickshire) (Post-1881 Childers Reforms known as the South Wales Borderers)

Once their ammunition had been expended, surviving British soldiers had no choice but to fight on with bayonet and rifle butt. A Zulu account relates the single-handed fight by the guard of Chelmsford's tent, a big Irishman of the 24th who kept the Zulus back with his bayonet until he was speared and the general's Union flag captured. Both the colours of the 2nd 24th were lost, while the Queen's colour of the 1st 24th was carried off the field by Lieutenant Melvill on horseback but lost when he crossed the river, despite Lieutenant Coghill having come to his aid. Both Melvill and Coghill were killed after crossing the river, and received posthumous Victoria Crosses in 1907 as the legend of their gallantry grew, and, after twenty-seven years of steady campaigning by the late Mrs. Melvill (who had died in 1906), on the strength of Queen Victoria being quoted as saying that 'if they had survived they would have been awarded the Victoria Cross'. Garnet Wolseley, who replaced Chelmsford, felt otherwise at the time and stated, "I don't like the idea of officers escaping on horseback when their men on foot are being killed."

A Popular Legend from the battles final stages Involves “The Man In The Cave” According to an anonymous Zulu eye witness from the uVe ibutho — Whose account was collected by the family of John William Colenso and published by his daughter Frances Colenso and Colonel Edward Durnford — a single unidentified British soldier of the 24th regiment of foot believed to be a part of C Company (led by Captain Reginald Younghusband) did not join his company’s final rush. Instead, he retreated to a small, boulder-screened cave at the foot of the Isandlwana cliffs, successfully holding off Zulu warriors alone using his rifle and bayonet until late afternoon when he was killed by a concentrated rifle volley. While later battlefield surveys by officers like Lieutenant H.G Mainwaring noted signs of a struggle near the cave, modern historians consider the exact details of the incident to be historically unconfirmed and partly romanticised into Victorian folklore. The story later heavily inspired Richard Thomas Moynan’s 1883 historical painting, “The Last of the 24th.”

The Last of the 24th, Isandlwana by Richard Thomas Moynan, 1883

Of the 1,800-plus force of British troops and African auxiliaries, over 1,300 were killed, most of them Europeans, including field commanders Pulleine and Durnford. Only five Imperial officers survived (including Lieutenants Henry Curling and Horace Smith-Dorrien), and of the 52 officers lost, 21 came from the 24th Foot. Amongst those killed was Surgeon Major Peter Shepherd, a first-aid pioneer. The Natal Native Contingent lost some 400 men, and there were 240 lost from the group of 249 amaChunu African auxiliaries. Perhaps the last to die was Gabangaye, the portly chief of the amaChunu Natal Native Contingent, who was given over to be killed by the udibi (porter or carrier) boys. The captured Natal Native Contingent soldiers were regarded as traitors by the Zulu and executed.

There was no casualty count of the Zulu losses by the British such as made in many of the other battles since they abandoned the field. Nor was there any count by the Zulu. Modern historians have rejected and reduced the older unfounded estimates. Historians Ron Lock and Peter Quantrill estimate the Zulu casualties as "... perhaps between 1,500 and 2,000 dead. Historian Ian Knight stated: "Zulu casualties were almost as heavy. Although it is impossible to say with certainty, at least 1,000 were killed outright in the assault..." Historian Mike Snook estimated 1,500–2,000 Zulu dead, with a similar number wounded. King Cetshwayo mourned the loss of Zulu warriors and was quoted as saying "An assegai has been thrust into the belly of the nation.

Some 1,000 Martini-Henry rifles, the two field artillery guns, four rocket troughs, 400,000 rounds of ammunition, three colours, most of the 2,000 draft animals and 130 wagons, provisions such as tinned food, biscuits, beer, overcoats, tents and other supplies, were taken by the Zulu or left abandoned on the field. Of the survivors, most were from the auxiliaries. The two field artillery guns which were taken to Ulundi as trophies, were later found abandoned by a British patrol after the Battle of Ulundi.

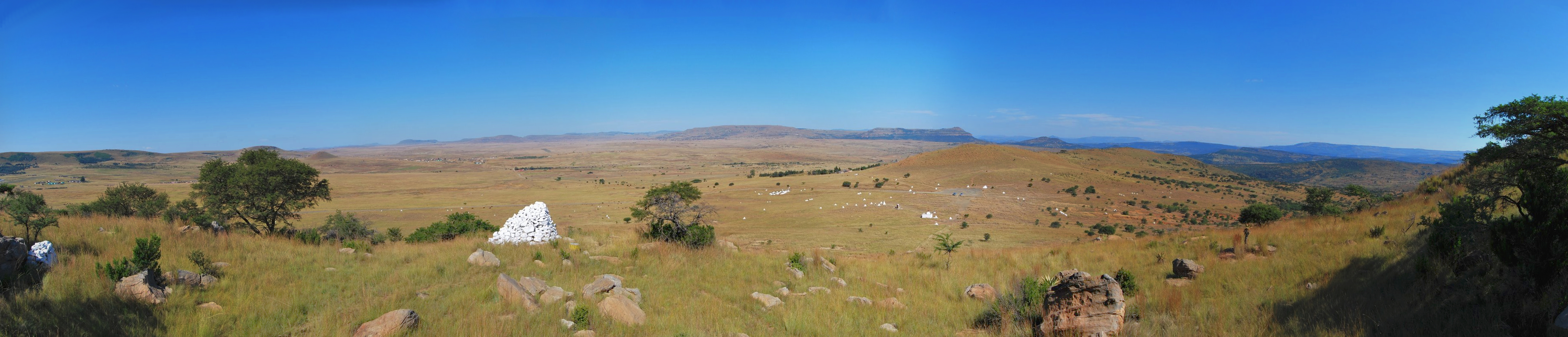
View of the Isandlwana battlefield

== Order of battle ==
The following order of battle was arrayed on the day.

=== British forces ===
==== No. 2 Column ====
Commanding Officer: Brevet Colonel Anthony Durnford, RE

- Staff – 2 officers, 1 NCO
- 11th/7th Brigade, Royal Artillery – 1 officer, 9 NCOs and men with a rocket battery (two 9pr Hale rocket troughs)
- Natal Native Horse (5 troops) – 5 officers, c. 259 NCOs and men
- 1st/1st Natal Native Contingent (2 companies) – 7 officers, c. 240 NCOs and men
- 2nd/1st Natal Native Contingent – 1 NCO

==== No. 3 Column ====
Commanding Officer: Brevet Lieutenant-Colonel Henry Pulleine, 1st/24th Foot

- Staff – 6 officers, 14 NCOs and men
- N/5th Brigade, Royal Field Artillery – 2 officers, 70 NCOs and men with two 7-pounder (3-inch) mountain guns deployed as field guns. As well as No2 Columns rocket battery, N/5 Battery also had two 9-pr rocket troughs as part of the battery. These are shown in the Narrative of Field Operations under the column strength and their presence proved in the 2025 publication 'Rocket Batteries and other Artillery in the Anglo-Zulu War 1879' by Kate Birbeck.
- 5th Field Company, Royal Engineers – 3 men
- 1st/24th Regiment of Foot (2nd Warwickshire) (5 companies) – 14 officers, 450 NCOs and men
- 2nd/24th Regiment of Foot (2nd Warwickshire) (1 company) – 5 officers, 150 NCOs and men
- 90th Regiment of Foot (Perthshire Light Infantry) – 10 men
- Army Service Corps – 3 men
- Army Hospital Corps – 1 officer, 10 NCOs and men
- Imperial Mounted Infantry (1 squadron) – 28 NCOs and men
- Natal Mounted Police – 34 NCOs and men
- Natal Carbineers – 2 officers, 26 NCOs and men
- Newcastle Mounted Rifles – 2 officers, 15 NCOs and men
- Buffalo Border Guards – 1 officer, 7 NCOs and men
- Natal Native Pioneer Corps – 1 officer, 10 men
- 1st/3rd Natal Native Contingent (2 companies) – 11 officers, c. 300 NCOs and men
- 2nd/3rd Natal Native Contingent (2 companies) – 9 officers, c. 300 NCOs and men

=== Zulu forces ===
==== Right horn ====
uDududu, uNokenke regiments, part uNodwengu corps – 3,000 to 4,000 men

==== Chest ====
umCijo, uKhandampevu, regiments; part uNodwengu corps – 7,000 to 9,000 men

==== Left horn ====
INgobamakhosi, uMbonambi, uVe regiments – 5,000 to 6,000 men

==== Loins (Reserves) ====
Undi corps, uDloko, iNdluyengwe, Indlondlo and Uthulwana regiments – 4,000 to 5,000 men

== Aftermath ==
=== Analysis ===
The Zulus avoided the dispersal of their main fighting force and concealed the advance and location of this force until they were within a few hours' striking distance of the British. When the location of the main Zulu Impi was discovered by British scouts, the Zulus immediately advanced and attacked, achieving tactical surprise. The British, although they now had some warning of a Zulu advance, were unable to concentrate their central column. It also left little time and gave scant information for Pulleine to organise the defence. The Zulus had outmanoeuvred Chelmsford and their victory at Isandlwana was complete and forced the main British force to retreat out of Zululand until a far larger British Army could be shipped to South Africa for a second invasion.

Recent historians, notably Lock and Quantrill in Zulu Victory, argue that from the Zulu perspective the theatre of operations included the diversions around Magogo Hills and Mangeni Falls and that these diversions, which drew more than half of Chelmsford's forces away from Isandlwana, were deliberate. Also, the main Zulu force was not unexpectedly discovered in their encampment but was fully deployed and ready to advance on the British camp. These historians' view of the expanded battlefield considers Chelmsford to have been the overall commander of the British forces and that responsibility for the defeat lies firmly with him.

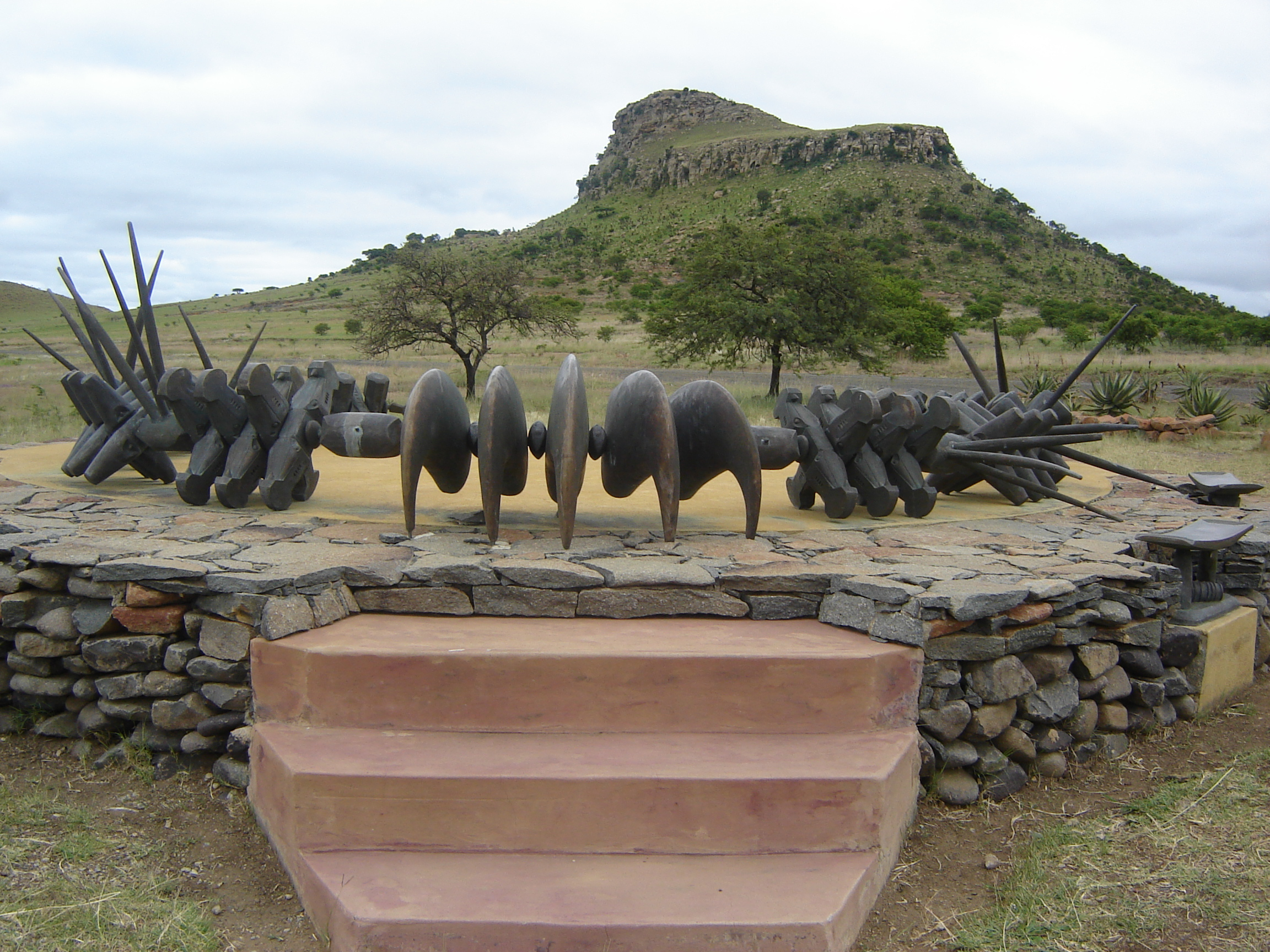
Memorial erected at the site commemorating the valour of the fallen Zulu impi at Isandlwana Hill, which is visible in the background

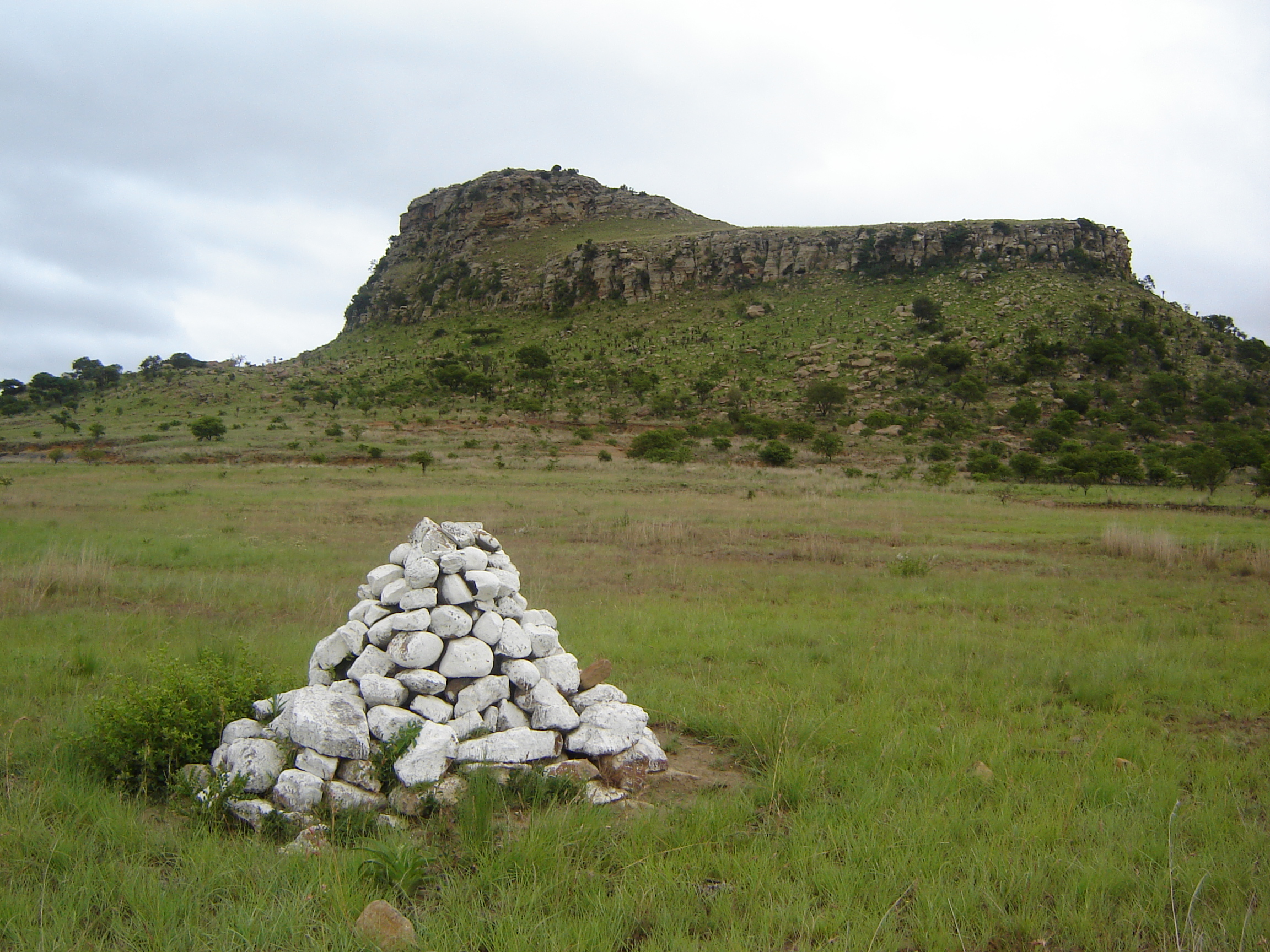
Photo of Isandlwana with one of the cairns marking one of the many British mass graves at the site

Debate persists as to how and why the British lost the battle. Many arguments focus on possible local tactical occurrences, as opposed to the strategic lapses and failings in grand tactics on the part of high command under Bartle Frere and Chelmsford. Still, the latter comes under scrutiny for mistakes that may have led directly to the British defeat. The initial view, reported by Horace Smith-Dorrien, was that the British had difficulty unpacking their ammunition boxes fast enough stating, "The box lids were screwed down, the screws were rusty and difficult to remove, there were too few screwdrivers, standing orders insisted that until a box was empty, no other boxes were to be opened, and the quartermasters were reluctant to distribute ammunition to units other than their own." Well-equipped and well-trained British soldiers could fire 10–12 rounds a minute. The lack of ammunition caused a lull in the defence and, in subsequent engagements with the Zulus, ammunition boxes were unscrewed in advance for rapid distribution.

Donald Morris in The Washing of the Spears argues that the men, fighting too far from the camp, ran out of ammunition, starting first with Durnford's men who were holding the right flank and who had been in action longer, which precipitated a slowdown in the rate of fire against the Zulus. This argument suggests that the ammunition was too far from the firing line and that the 70 rounds each man took to the firing line were not sufficient. A different view, supported with evidence from the battlefield, such as Ian Knight and Lt. Colonel Snook's works, (the latter having written How Can Man Die Better?), suggests that, although Durnford's men probably did run out of ammunition, the majority of men in the firing line did not. The discovery of the British line so far out from the camp has led Ian Knight to conclude that the British were defending too large a perimeter.

The official interrogation by Horse Guards under the direction of the Duke of Cambridge, the Field Marshal Commanding in Chief, in August 1879, concluded that the primary cause of the defeat was the "under estimate formed of the offensive fighting power of the Zulu army." Additionally the investigation questions Chelmsford as to why the camp was not laagered and why there was a failure to reconnoitre and discover the nearby Zulu army. Frances Colenso calls Chelmsford's neglecting to follow his own "Regulations for Field Forces in South Africa", which required that a defensible camp be established at every halt, fatal.

Numerous messages, some quite early in the day, had been sent to Chelmsford informing him, initially, of the presence of the Zulu near the camp and, subsequently, of the attack on the camp, with increasingly urgent pleas for help. The most egregious failure to respond occurred at around 1:30 pm when a message from Hamilton-Browne stating, "For God's sake come back, the camp is surrounded, and things I fear are going badly", was received by Lieutenant-Colonel Harness of the Royal Artillery and Major Black of the 2/24. They were leading the other four RA guns as well as two companies of the 2/24 and on their own initiative immediately marched back towards Isandlwana and had gone some two miles when they were ordered to return to Mangeni Falls by an aide sent by Chelmsford.

At long last but too late, finally Chelmsford became convinced of the seriousness of the situation on his left flank and rear when at 3:30pm he joined Hamilton-Browne's NNC and realised the camp had been taken. Meanwhile, an NNC officer, Rupert Lonsdale, who had left Chelmsford's force to get rations for his men, had found the camp in Zulu hands and experienced a narrow escape. When Lonsdale reached Chelmsford and described the camp's fall, Chelmsford replied, "But I left over 1,000 men to guard the camp". He quickly gathered his scattered forces and marched the column back to Isandlwana but arrived at sundown long after the battle ended and the Zulu army had marched off. The British camped on the field that night but left before sunrise without any examination of the ground as Chelmsford felt that it would demoralize his troops. The column then proceeded to Rorke's Drift.

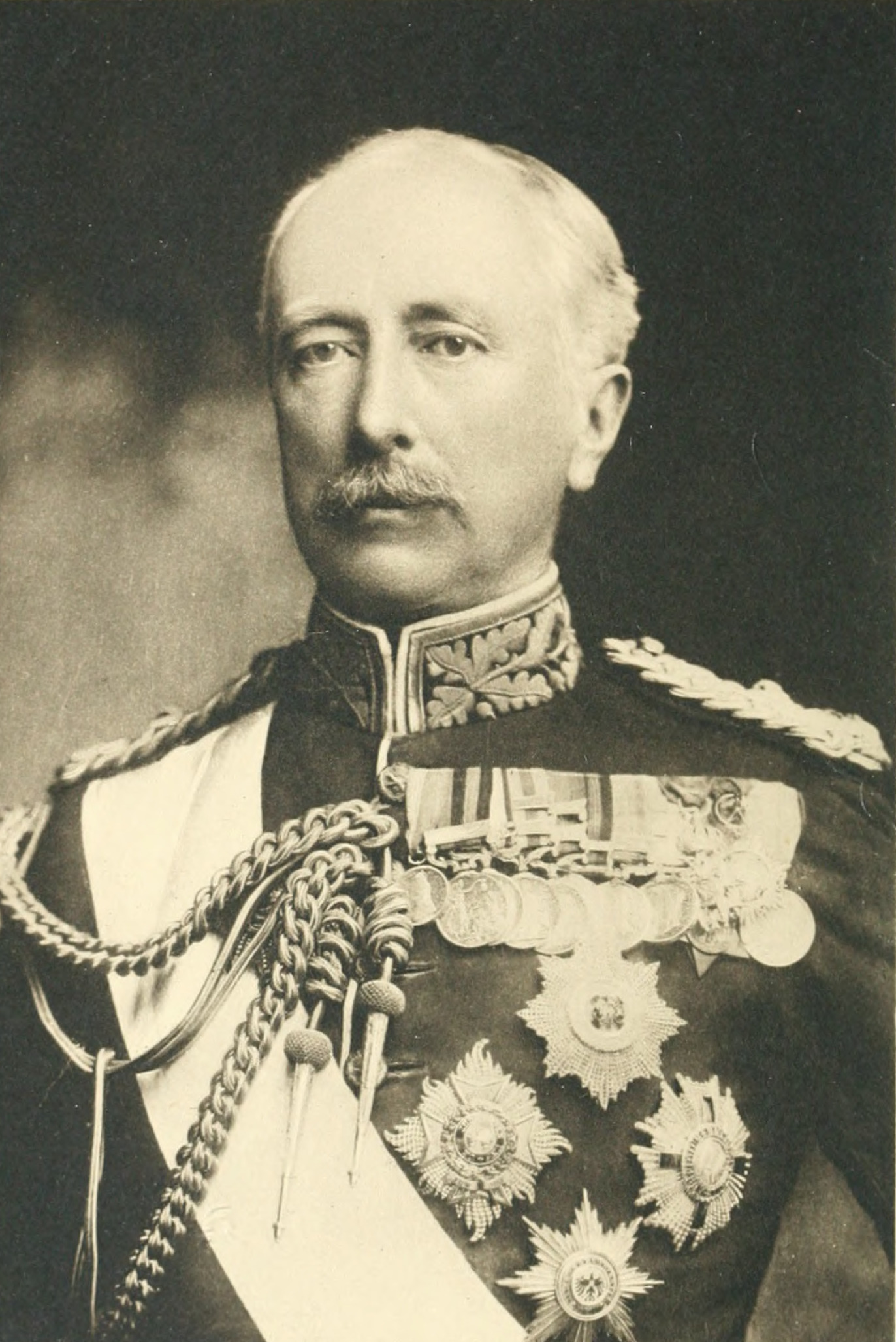
Field Marshal Lord Wolseley

Though Isandlwana was a disaster for the British, the Zulu victory did not end the war. With the defeat of Chelmsford's central column, the invasion of Zululand collapsed and would have to be restaged. Not only were there heavy manpower casualties to the Main Column, but most of the supplies, ammunition and draught animals were lost. As King Cetshwayo feared, the embarrassment of the defeat would force the policy makers in London, who to this point had not supported the war, to rally to the support of the pro-war contingent in the Natal government and commit whatever resources were needed to defeat the Zulus. Despite local numerical superiority, the Zulus did not have the manpower, technological resources, or logistical capacity to match the British in another, more extended, campaign.

The Zulus may have missed an opportunity to exploit their victory and possibly win the war that day on their own territory. The reconnaissance force under Chelmsford was more vulnerable to being defeated by an attack than the camp. It was strung out and somewhat scattered, it had marched with limited rations and ammunition it could not now replace, and it was panicky and demoralized by the defeat at Isandlwana.

Near the end of the battle, about 4,000 Zulu warriors of the unengaged reserve Undi impi, after cutting off the retreat of the survivors to the Buffalo River southwest of Isandlwana, crossed the river and attacked the fortified mission station at Rorke's Drift. The station was defended by only 150 British soldiers, who nonetheless inflicted considerable casualties and repelled the attack. Elsewhere, the left and right flanks of the invading forces were now isolated and without support. The No. 1 Column under the command of Charles Pearson was besieged for two months by a Zulu force led by kaMpande and Mavumengwana, at Eshowe, while the No. 4 column under Evelyn Wood halted its advance and spent most of the next two months skirmishing in the northwest around Tinta's Kraal.

Following Isandlwana and Rorke's Drift, the British and Colonials were in complete panic over the possibility of a counter invasion of Natal by the Zulus. All the towns of Natal 'laagered' up and fortified and provisions and stores were laid in. Bartle Frere stoked the fear of invasion despite the fact that, aside from Rorke's Drift, the Zulus made no attempt to cross the border. Immediately following the battle, Zulu Prince Ndanbuko urged them to advance and take the war into the colony but they were restrained by a commander, kaNthati, reminding them of Cetshwayo's prohibiting the crossing of the border. Unbeknownst to the inhabitants of Natal, Cetshwayo, still hoping to avoid outright war, had prohibited any crossing of the border in retaliation and was incensed over the violation of the border by the attack on Rorke's Drift.

The British government's reasoning for a new invasion was threefold. The first was the loss of national pride as a result of the defeat, and the desire to avenge it by winning the war. The second concerned the domestic political implications at the next parliamentary elections held in Britain. However, despite the second invasion attempt, the British Prime Minister Disraeli and his Conservative Party lost the 1880 general election. The final reason concerned the Empire; unless the British were seen to win a clear-cut victory against the Zulus, it would send a signal to the outside world that the British Empire was vulnerable to the point where the destruction of a British field army could alter the policy of Britain's government. The British government was concerned that the Zulu victory could inspire imperial unrest, particularly among the Boers, and as such sought to quash any such possibilities by swiftly defeating the Zulu Kingdom.

After Isandlwana, the British field army in South Africa was heavily reinforced and again invaded Zululand. Sir Garnet Wolseley was sent to take command and relieve Chelmsford, as well as Bartle Frere. Chelmsford, however, avoided handing over command to Wolseley and managed to defeat the Zulus in a number of engagements, the last of which was the Battle of Ulundi, followed by capture of King Cetshwayo. With the fall of the Disraeli government, Bartle Frere was recalled in August 1880 and the policy of Confederation was abandoned. The British government encouraged the subkings of the Zulus to rule their subkingdoms without acknowledging a central Zulu power. By the time King Cetshwayo was allowed to return home, the Zulu Kingdom had ceased to exist as an independent entity.

The measure of respect that the British gained for their opponents as a result of Isandlwana can be seen in that in none of the other engagements of the Zulu War did the British attempt to fight again in their typical linear formation, known famously as the Thin Red Line, in an open-field battle with the main Zulu impi. In the battles that followed, the British, when facing the Zulu, entrenched themselves or formed very close-order formations, such as the square.

=== Recriminations ===
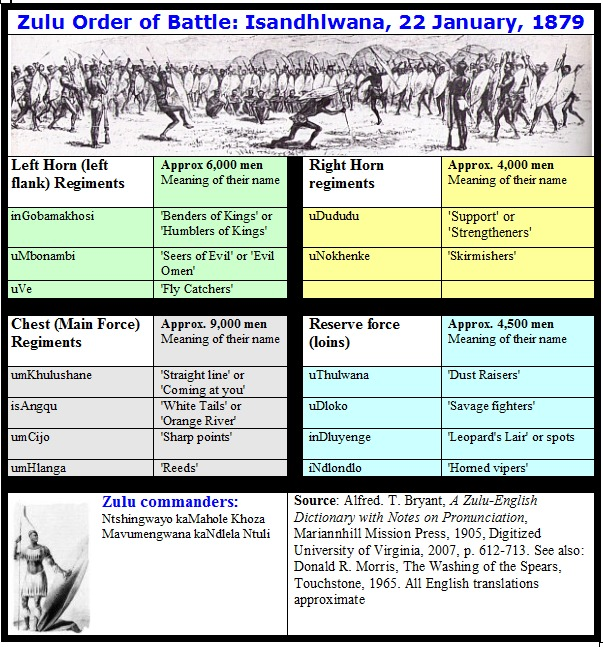
At Isandhlawana, the Zulu impis scored their greatest victory, liquidating a significant part of the British invasion force.

Chelmsford realised that he would need to account to the government and to history for the disaster. He quickly fixed blame on Durnford, claiming Durnford disobeyed his orders to fix a proper defensive camp, although there is no evidence such an order was issued and there would hardly have been time for Durnford to entrench. Further, it had been Chelmsford's decision not to entrench the camp, as it was meant to be temporary.

Wolseley wrote on 30 September 1879 when, later in the war, the Prince Imperial of France was killed by the Zulu: "I think this is very unfair, and is merely a repetition of what was done regarding the Isandlwana disaster where the blame was thrown upon Durnford, the real object in both instances being apparently to screen Chelmsford."

Some historians hold that the victory at Ulundi was a token one, driven by the need for Lord Chelmsford to salvage some success after Isandhlwana, and the British withdrew quickly followed by Chelmsford's resignation as commander of the British forces. The end of the war saw the Zulu retaining their lands.

== Media ==
- African Litany, the second album by Johnny Clegg and his band Juluka, containing the track "Impi" about this battle.
- Zulu Dawn, a 1979 American adventure war film about the Battle of Isandlwana.
- Zulu, a 1964 British epic historical film which depicts the aftermath of the Battle of Isandlwana in the opening scene.

== See also ==
- Bambatha Rebellion
- Battle of Blood River
- Colony of Natal
- Military history of the United Kingdom
- Military history of South Africa

== Print sources ==
- Colenso, Frances; Durnford, Edward (1880). History of the Zulu War and Its Origin. London: Chapman and Hall. ISBN 1-152-31729-6. Archived from the original on 18 June 2007.
- Pollard, Tony (2002). "The Mountain is their Monument". In Doyle, Peter; Bennett, Matthew R. (eds.). Fields of Battle. Kluwer Academic Publishers. pp. 118–. ISBN 1-4020-0433-8.
- Gump, James O. (1996). The Dust Rose Like Smoke: The Subjugation of the Zulu and the Sioux. Bison Books. ISBN 0-8032-7059-3.
- Knight, Ian; Castle, Ian (1992). Zulu War 1879, Twilight of a Warrior Nation. Osprey. ISBN 1-85532-165-3.
- Knight, Ian (2002). Isandlwana 1879: The Great Zulu Victory. Osprey. ISBN 1-84176-511-2.
- Knight, Ian (2003). The Anglo-Zulu War. Osprey. ISBN 1-84176-612-7.
- Knight, Ian; Castle, Ian (2004). Zulu War. Osprey. ISBN 1-84176-858-8.
- Laband, John (2009). Historical Dictionary of the Zulu Wars. Scarecrow Press. ISBN 978-0-8108-6078-0.
- Lock, Ron; Quantrill, Peter (2002). Zulu Victory: The Epic of Isandlwana and the Cover-up. Johannesburg & Cape Town: Jonathan Ball Publishers. ISBN 1-86842-214-3.
- Mitford, Bertrand (1883). Through the Zulu Country. London: Kegan Paul, Trench & Co.
- Morris, Donald R. The Washing of the Spears: A History of the Rise of the Zulu Nation under Shaka and Its Fall in the Zulu War of 1879 Da Capo Press, 1998, ISBN 0-306-80866-8.
- Smith-Dorrien, Horace. Memories of Forty-eight Years Service, London, 1925.
- Spiers, Edward M. . The Scottish Soldier and Empire, 1854–1902, Edinburgh University Press, 2006.
- Thompson, Paul Singer (2006). Black soldiers of the queen: the Natal native contingent in the Anglo-Zulu War. University of Alabama Press. ISBN 0-8173-5368-2.
