= Isandlwana =

Isolated hill in the KwaZulu-Natal province of South Africa

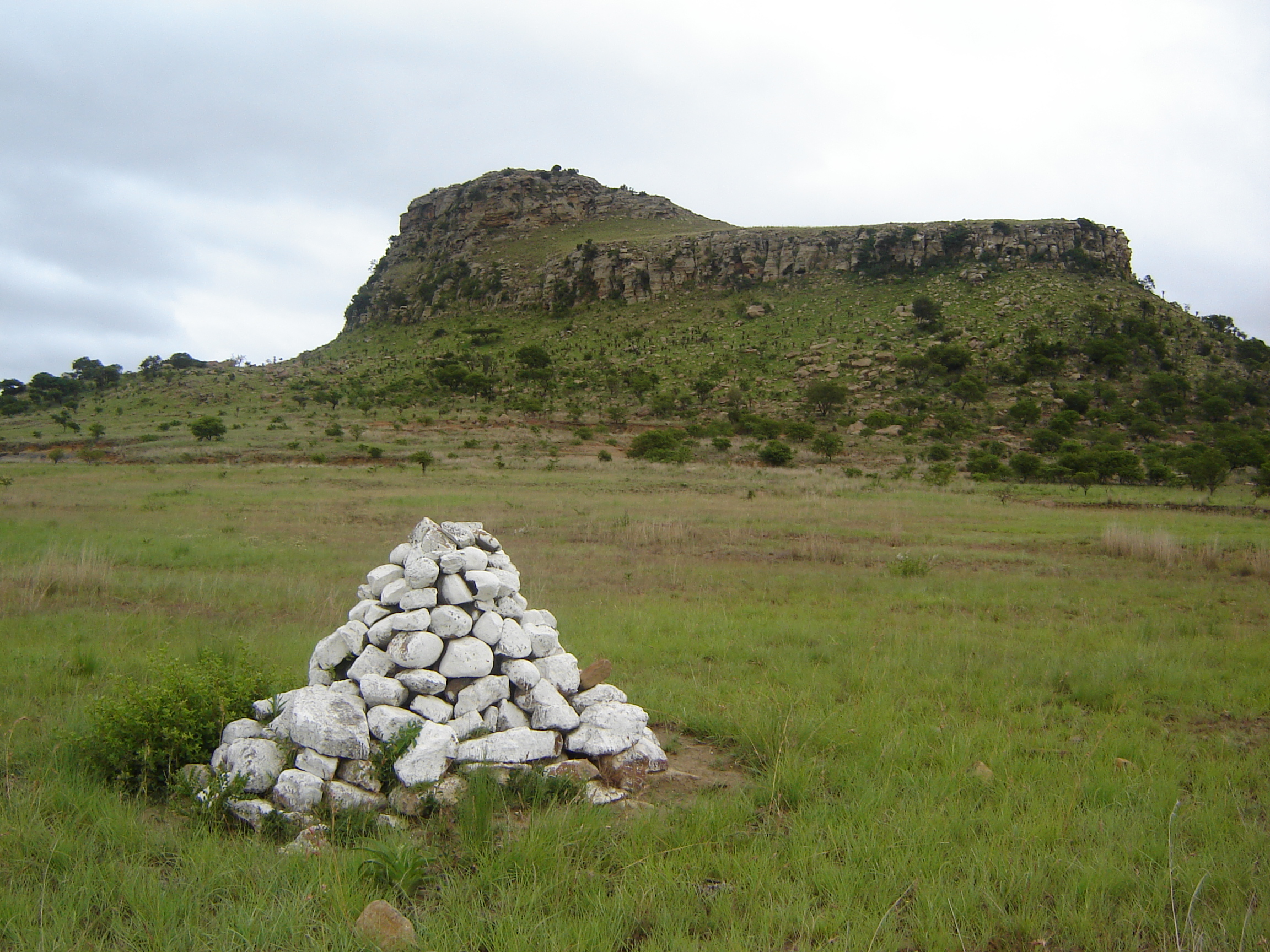
- Isandlwana with a Scottish cairn marking a grave from the Battle of Isandlwana

Highest point
- Elevation: 1,284 m (4,213 ft)
- Listing: List of mountains in South Africa
- Coordinates: 28°21′7″S 30°39′6″E

Geography
- Location within KwaZulu-Natal
- Location: KwaZulu-Natal
- Parent range: Drakensberg foothill

Climbing
- First ascent: Unknown
- Easiest route: From Dundee

Isandlwana (Zulu pronunciation: [ísanˈdɮwáːna]) (older spelling Isandhlwana, also sometimes seen as Isandula) is an isolated hill in the KwaZulu-Natal province of South Africa. It is located 169 kilometres (105 mi) north by northwest of Durban. The name is said to mean abomasum, the second stomach of the cow, because it reminded the Zulus of its shape.

== History ==
This mountain has historical significance. On 22 January 1879, Isandlwana was the site of the Battle of Isandlwana, where approximately 22,000 Zulu warriors defeated a contingent of approximately 1,750 British and African troops in one of the first engagements of the Anglo-Zulu War. The Zulu force was primarily under the command of Ntshingwayo kaMahole Khoza. The battle was one of the worst defeats suffered by the British Army during the Victorian era.

Isandlwana hill (28°21′32″S 30°39′9″E) rises 9.7 kilometres (6 mi) due east of Rorke's Drift, a ford on the Buffalo River, a tributary of the Tugela River.

== See also ==
- Battle of Isandlwana
- List of mountains in South Africa
- SAS Isandlwana (F146) - a Valour-class frigate of the South African Navy
