= Buffalo River (KwaZulu-Natal) =

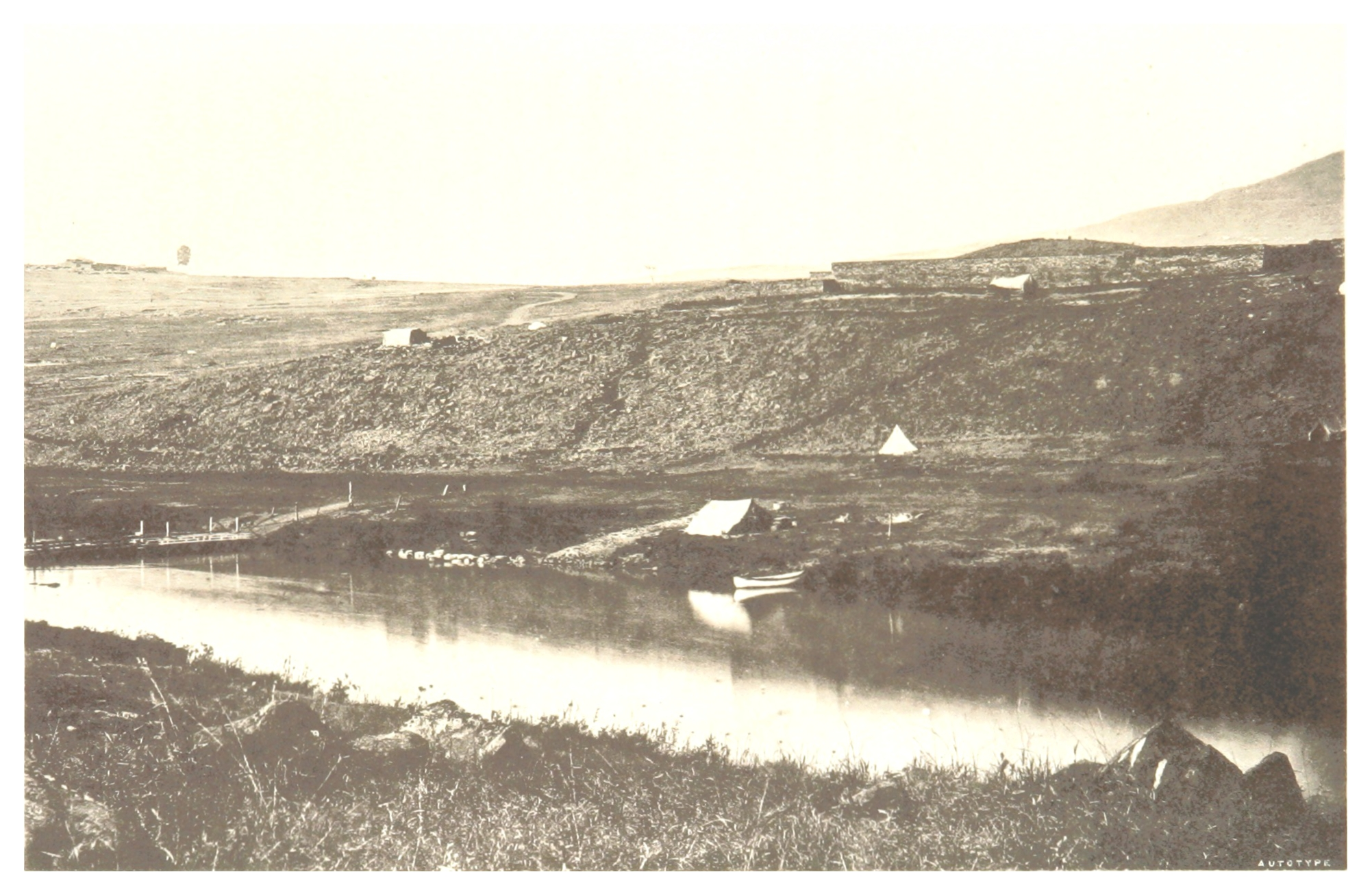
- Buffalo River at Rorke's Drift

- Location of the Buffalo River's mouth
- Native name: Mzinyathi (Zulu)

Location
- Country: South Africa
- State: KwaZulu-Natal

Physical characteristics
- Source: Near Majuba Hill
  - location: Drakensberg
- Mouth
  - location: Tugela River
  - coordinates: 28°42′59″S 30°38′30″E
  - elevation: 465 metres (1,526 ft)
- Length: 426 km (265 mi)
- Basin size: 13,000 km^{2} (5,000 sq mi)

The Buffalo River (Zulu: uMzinyathi; Afrikaans: Buffelsrivier) is the largest tributary of the Tugela River in South Africa. With a total length of 426 km (265 mi), its source is in Majuba Hill, "Hill of Doves" in the Zulu language, located northeast of Volksrust, close to the Mpumalanga / KwaZulu-Natal border. It follows a southerly route into KwaZulu-Natal past Newcastle then turns southeast past Rorke's Drift, before joining the Tugela River at Ngubevu near Nkandla. During the nineteenth century it formed part of the boundary between the Colony of Natal and Zululand.

The Buffalo River has a number of tributaries, including the Ingagane from the SW and the Blood River from the NE, which it joins near Kandi Mountain. Rorke's Drift is a ford across the Buffalo River which is one of the famous places of the 1878–79 Anglo-Zulu War and Isandhlwana is another important place of that war located about 20 km SE of the river, not far from the confluence with the Tugela.

== Tributaries ==
- Batshe
- Bzangoma
- Blood River
- Cold Stream
- Doringspruit
- Dorpspruit
- Kweekspruit
- Mangeni River
- Imbabane River
- Mngeni River
- Mbizana River (Buffalo)
- Ndweni
- Ingagane
- Sandspruit
- Sibindi
- Slang River
- Teku River
- Wasbankspruit
- Womeni

== See also ==
- List of rivers of South Africa
- Drainage basins of South Africa
