= Natal Native Pioneer Corps =

Unit of the British Colonial Auxiliary Forces

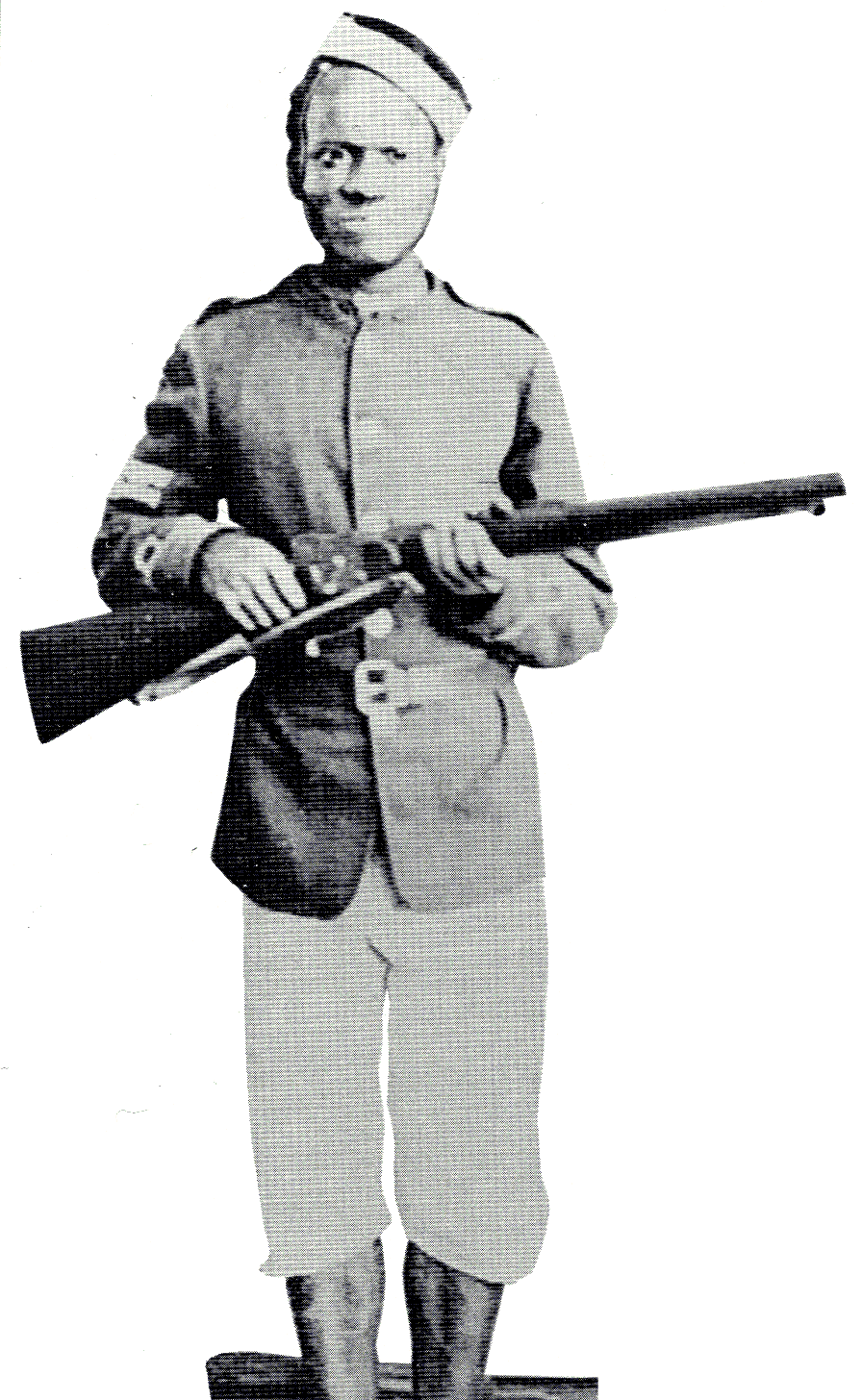
- A non-commissioned officer of the Corps
- Active: November 1878–October 1879
- Country: Natal Colony
- Allegiance: British Empire
- Branch: British Colonial Auxiliary Forces
- Type: Pioneers
- Size: c. 300
- Engagements: Anglo-Zulu War: Battle of Inyezane; Battle of Isandlwana; Siege of Eshowe; Battle of Ulundi

The Natal Native Pioneer Corps, commonly referred to as the Natal Pioneers, was a unit of the British Colonial Auxiliary Forces which served in the Anglo-Zulu War. The pioneers were raised by levy from the black population of the Colony of Natal in November 1878; they provided a force of men to carry out military engineering tasks during the British invasion of Zululand. They were formed into three companies of around 100 men and issued with old British Army jackets, white short trousers and blue pillbox hats. The non-commissioned officers of the unit were armed with a rifle, and the other men were issued with tools. White officers were supplied by the government of Natal but, where possible, were supplemented with British regulars.

No. 1 Company was assigned to Lieutenant-General Lord Chelmsford's No. 2 Column, the principal British force during the first invasion of Zululand, and a small detachment fought at the Battle of Isandlwana. After this defeat, the company joined Evelyn Wood's Flying Column for the second invasion and participated in the Battle of Ulundi, the final pitched battle of the war that ended in a British victory. No. 2 Company was assigned to the Right Column during the first invasion and fought at the Battle of Inyezane before being besieged at Eshowe for 10 weeks. During the second invasion it formed part of the 1st Division and escorted wagons along the lines of communication. No. 3 Company was assigned to Colonel Anthony Durnford's No. 3 Column but did not join the first invasion; it was posted to an important river crossing to guard against a Zulu counter-invasion of Natal.

The Natal Pioneers improved tracks throughout the war for the British logistics train, particularly at river crossings; they also constructed forts and field entrenchments. During the Siege of Eshowe, No. 2 Company distinguished itself in scouting, foraging and raiding. The force suffered from some disciplinary issues; during the first invasion the men of No. 2 Company were punished for looting. In the closing stages of the war in August, No. 1 Company protested at being kept on active service longer than the other black Natal levies. In September the company mutinied but returned to duty after being arrested and punished. The Natal Native Pioneer Corps was disbanded in October 1879.

== Background ==
Boers settlers had established the Natalia Republic in 1838 on land near Port Natal (modern-day Durban, South Africa) ceded by the Zulu king Dingane. The republic grew with further land ceded by Dingane's successor Mpande kaSenzangakhona. The Boers submitted to British rule in 1842 and the District of Port Natal was created in 1843, initially as part of Cape Colony to the south; the Colony of Natal was established in 1856.

Natal bordered the Zulu Kingdom (commonly known as Zululand) and the relative security provided by British oversight made it a refuge for fugitives fleeing from conflicts in Zululand. As a result the black population of the colony rose from around 20-42,000 in 1840 to 320,000 in 1879. British migration to the colony was low and many of the original Boers emigrated to new territories such as the independent South African Republic (commonly known as the Transvaal). By 1879 the white population of the colony numbered around 27,000 and there were around 17,000 Indians. Black emigrants from Zululand remained largely in their chiefdoms (known in the Bantu languages by the prefix "ama") which were allocated territory within the colony, but these were overcrowded and located on the least desirable land. The British recognised 99 hereditary chiefs by 1878 as well as 46 appointed chiefs or head men of lower status. The chiefs' power was gradually eroded as British law took the place of traditional tribal law and taxation was imposed.

In the late 1870s, the British High Commissioner for Southern Africa, Sir Henry Bartle Frere, attempted to form a confederation of British possessions in the region. As part of this ambition, the annexation of Zululand was planned. In 1878, the senior British military commander in the region, Lieutenant-General Frederic Thesiger (later and more commonly known as Lord Chelmsford), began gathering forces in Natal for an invasion of Zululand. Chelmsford's plan called for an advance by five columns of troops, although manpower shortages required him to reduce this to three. The Right Column (formerly No. 1 Column) under Colonel Charles Pearson was to advance along the eastern coast, the Left Column (formerly No. 4 Column) under Colonel Evelyn Wood was to launch a feint on the west flank, and Chelmsford's Centre Column (comprising the combined Nos. 2 & 3 Columns) was to advance on the Zulu capital at Ulundi. The former No. 5 Column under Colonel Hugh Rowlands was assigned to the recently-annexed Transvaal Colony to defend its border with Zululand.

The majority of British supplies were carried by ox-drawn wagons. There were no roads in Zululand and the existing unimproved paths were used only by traders; they turned to quagmires in the rain and were occasionally broken by steep-sided dongas (dry river beds). River fords (locally known as drifts) were impassable in high water and quickly ruined when trafficked heavily.

== Formation ==
Places mentioned in the text, borders are those of the modern-day province of KwaZulu-Natal, South Africa

Chelmsford, guided by the commander of No. 2 Column, Colonel Anthony Durnford — a seasoned South African campaigner — raised a force of pioneers from the black subjects of Natal to assist the columns with engineering tasks such as improvement of the tracks. This was a development of the Natal government's long-established isiBhalo levy system (Note: IsiBhalo (Xhosa language: "scripture") had its origins in a corvée system used by the Zulu monarchy. It was established in Natal in 1848 and required unmarried young men to provide up to six months labour on public works projects. Each chief was required to supply one labourer for every eleven huts they controlled. Rates of pay were 25-50% below the market rate so the scheme was unpopular and frequently evaded.) by which men were pressed into duty to carry out road repairs. Durnford had formed similar forces during the 1873 rebellion of the Hlubi chief Langalibalele in Natal.

Three companies of pioneers were raised, with a nominal strength of 5 white officers (1 captain and 4 lieutenants), 4 black non-commissioned officers (NCOs) and 96 men. (Note: Only No. 2 Company ever reached full strength.) It had originally been intended that each company would be commanded by a regular British Army officer of the Royal Engineers, but there were too few to spare, so Durnford had to turn to the Natal government to supply suitable men. The colony's acting Secretary for Native Affairs, John Wesley Shepstone, selected the three chiefs who would be responsible for providing the men for the unit. Levies were also being taken for men to form the Natal Native Contingent (NNC), which had been raised as an auxiliary fighting force, and Durnford instructed that the best men from these levies also be sent to the Natal Pioneers.

The Natal Colony supplied the equipment for the pioneers: each man was provided with a pickaxe, shovel or crowbar and the non-commissioned officers were issued with a rifle. (Note: Fears among the white settlers of Natal over the arming of the black population had led to the decision to limit the number of firearms issued to the levies. The Natal Native Contingent was generally issued the obsolete Pattern 1853 Enfield muzzle-loading, percussion lock rifled musket and instructions were issued for them to carry only four rounds of ammunition. In British Army service these weapons had been converted to the quicker-firing breech-loading action from 1866 before being replaced by the purpose built Martini–Henry breech-loading rifle from 1871.) The men were issued uniforms of cast-off pre-1872 British Army frock jackets, (Note: The frock jackets were red coats of the style long worn by British line infantrymen. Before issue to the pioneers they had their cuffs and collar removed as these were coloured to identify different British Army regiments.) knee-length white canvas trousers, a blue pillbox hat with a yellow band and a British Army greatcoat. (Note: Durnford had intended that the NNC would be similarly uniformed, but a lack of supply left them to make do with only a red rag tied around the head as means of distinguishing them from their Zulu adversaries.) The pioneers were issued a 22-pound (10.0 kg) cooking pot for every ten men and supplied with a daily ration of a 1 pound (0.45 kg) of mealie (maize) meal, 1.5 pounds (0.68 kg) of fresh meat and 2 ounces (57 g) of salt. Their pay was £1 (equivalent to £107 in 2025) a month, with NCOs receiving an additional five shillings (£0.25, equivalent to £27 in 2025).

The Natal Pioneers were raised from November 1878 and ordered to assemble at Fort Napier in Pietermaritzburg in early December. They served throughout the Anglo-Zulu War of the following year and were disbanded in October 1879, after the Zulu capitulation.

== No. 1 Company ==
=== Formation and first invasion ===
No. 1 Company was commanded by Lieutenant W. J. Nolan and numbered 80 men. The company was formed of men supplied by Chief Mbozana of the amaNgangoma from the Verulam district. Together with a detachment of the amaNgcolosi, assigned to No. 3 Company, they were the first men to report for duty with the pioneers and arrived at Fort Napier on 23 December. They spent around a week being drilled by Nolan in the town engineer's yard. The pioneers of No. 1 Company were generally older, married men.

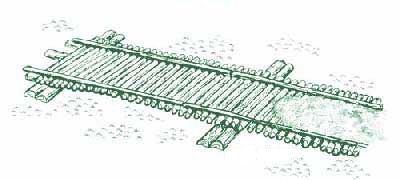
Depiction of a corduroy road

No. 1 Company was inspected by Frere and Chelmsford on 6 January 1879 and were afterwards assigned to No. 3 Column. They left Pietermaritzburg for the front on 11 January, the same day the column crossed the Buffalo River into Zululand at Rorke's Drift. No. 1 Company was put to use almost immediately as the marshy ground in the vicinity of the Bashee River proved impassable to Chelmsford's wagon train, heading to its first camp in Zululand at Isandlwana. The company worked from 14 to 19 January on construction of a corduroy road across the soft ground and improving fords across a number of streams. They were assisted by men of the NNC and some British infantry.

At Isandlwana the company occupied a position adjacent to the track that ran through the southern portion of the British position; at night they supplied a guard detail for the track. Chelmsford left the camp with around half his troops on the morning of 22 January 1879 to conduct a reconnaissance in force around the Mangeni Falls, where elements of the Zulu army had been spotted. Nolan and the majority of No. 1 Company joined the vanguard of this force to help clear a route for the artillery and assist in the crossing of several dongas. A small detail of one officer and ten men was left behind at the camp which was overrun by the Zulu during the Battle of Isandlwana later the same day.

=== Second invasion ===
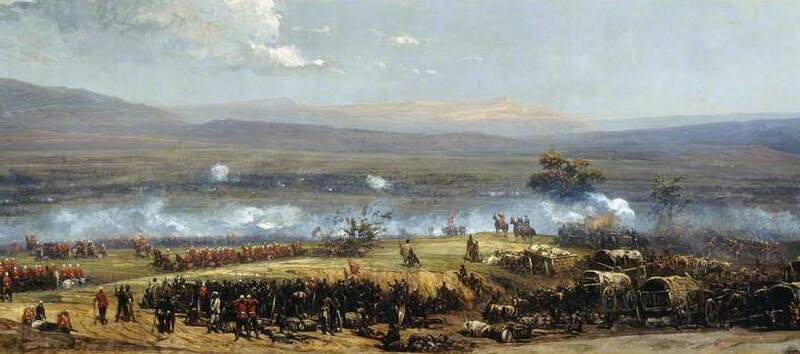
Detail from Adolphe Yvon's 1880 painting of the Battle of Ulundi, showing black troops in the centre of the British square.

After Isandlwana, No. 1 Company was reassigned to Wood's Left Column. During the second invasion of Zululand, which began in May, it was assigned to Wood's Flying Column which marched on the flank of Chelmsford's 2nd Division, advancing on Ulundi. The company participated in the British victory at the Battle of Ulundi on 4 July, the final pitched battle of the war. Nolan had by then been promoted to captain and commanded 4 officers and 46 men. The company was positioned in the centre of the British square and helped to entrench the position while under Zulu fire, raising a 3-foot (0.91 m) high embankment. They suffered no deaths in action, although Lieutenants Hickley and Andrews were wounded, one of them struck on the head by a bullet.

There was some discontent in No. 1 Company later in July as the Natal Native Horse and Wood's Irregulars (Swazi levies) had been disbanded following the victory at Ulundi and the pioneers also wanted to return home. The explanation that they were being kept because they were so useful to the British only partially mollified the men. The company accompanied British patrols across Zululand, searching for the Zulu king Cetshwayo; the king was captured on 28 August. On 2 September No. 1 Company was reviewed by Frere at Ulundi and complimented on its discipline and "workmanlike appearance". On 6 September Nolan reported to his superiors that the men wanted to go home and had said they would refuse orders that would taken them via the Middle Drift as they would have to carry out work to make this route viable. Colonel Charles Clarke, Nolan's superior, ordered the company to be arrested by British infantry, had two men flogged for insubordination and others fined, which ended the mutiny. No. 1 Company continued to be deployed with Clarke's column for the rest of the campaign, improving tracks as it marched back to Natal via Eshowe and the Middle Drift.

== No. 2 Company ==
=== Formation and first invasion ===
No. 2 Company was commanded by Captain G. K. E. Beddoes and comprised 104 men. It was formed of men supplied by Chief Mahoyiza of the amaQanya from the Msinga district. Mahoyiza's levies were slow to arrive as he was not popular among his people and three of his five head men refused to send any men. A white settler, unwilling to lose his labour force, also intervened to prevent men from being sent away. The resident magistrate of the area called on other chiefs to provide labour but, before this could be actioned, Mahoyiza succeeded in raising the men required of him.

No. 2 Company was assigned to Pearson's Right Column and worked in the vanguard, preparing the road ahead of the British advance. They were the second unit of the column (after the naval brigade) to cross the Tugela River into Zululand on 12 January and went on to loot nearby Zulu homesteads, for which they were punished. That afternoon Lieutenant Thomas Main, a regular Royal Engineers officer and veteran of the Ninth Cape Frontier War, was ordered to join the company. Main had previously served as Pearson's chief engineer, including for the construction of Fort Pearson, but had been superseded by Captain Warren Richard Colvin Wynne, posted out from Britain. Main thought that his appointment brought some much needed technical expertise to the company as he considered that Beddoes' knowledge of engineering "was but slight".

A contemporary depiction of British troops and wagons crossing the Amatikulu drift

Pearson split his column into two divisions: the advanced division of faster troops and a second division which contained much of the slower logistics train. During the advance to the mission station at Eshowe part of No. 2 Company, commanded by Main, worked at the front of the advanced division to improve the track. For superintending this work, Main was mentioned in despatches made by Pearson to the British House of Commons. A detachment of 20 men of No. 2 Company operated further back along the column to make repairs to the track. On 20 January, under the direction of Wynne, the pioneers, two companies of The Buffs and four companies of the NNC worked in advance of the column to improve a drift across the Amatikulu river. On 22 January the Zulu ambushed the advanced division of the column soon after it had crossed the next river on the line of advance, the Inyezane. Main's detachment was towards the front of the column and found itself in an exposed position on a knoll. The pioneers opened a rapid and erratic fire that had little effect on the Zulu until Main, by threats of summary execution, convinced them to cease fire and lie down. The British regular troops, the NNC and artillery won the day by means of superior firepower and the Zulus were forced to retreat. The day after the battle, the column reached Eshowe and work began on fortifying it.

=== Siege of Eshowe and second invasion ===
A drawing showing the fortifications at Eshowe with black Natal Native Contingent personnel and white Natal mounted volunteers in the foreground

On 27 January the column received orders from Chelmsford, advising them of the Zulu victory at Isandlwana and the cancellation of the invasion. Most of Pearson's NNC and the mounted troops were sent back to Natal. The pioneers were the only significant black-majority unit retained in Eshowe, which was to be held as a foothold in Zululand. From late January until early April 1879 Eshowe was besieged by the Zulu. No. 2 Company distinguished itself in the siege, carrying out scouting work as well as its regular engineering duties. They were particularly successful at looting foodstuffs such as mealie and pumpkins from Zulu homesteads and gardens to supplement the defenders' meagre rations. On 1 March the company formed part of a 500-man force sent to raid the eSiqwakeni Zulu homestead, with some of the men detailed to act as stretcher bearers. The party burnt the homestead and three others but were closely pursued back to Eshowe and lucky to escape without casualties.

By 10 March the post was in communication with a relief column sent by Chelmsford. (Note: Communications had been established by a makeshift heliograph constructed by Wynne. Beddoes greatly improved the efficiency and effectiveness of the device by making a pivot for the signalling mirror and constructing a sighting system.) The pioneers were employed in constructing a road to make the advance of the relief column easier but it was too dangerous to remain outside the fort at night which allowed the Zulus opportunity to wreck the works. The pioneers, directed by Beddoes, constructed an improvised explosive device that is thought to have caused several casualties when triggered by the Zulu and ended the sabotage efforts. The pioneers formed part of a force readied to sally to the assistance of the relief column at short notice. This proved unnecessary; Chelmsford's column won a major victory against a Zulu attack on 2 April in the Battle of Gingindlovu and arrived at Eshowe the following day to raise the siege.

On 4 April No. 2 Company participated in the capture and burning of the eZulwini homestead of Dabulamanzi kaMpande, the brother of Cetshwayo and one of the Zulu commanders at Isandlwana; the British abandoned Eshowe later that day and returned to Natal. During the second invasion of Zululand, No. 2 Company formed part of the 1st Division operating on the coast; it was employed in escorting wagons along the lines of communication.

== No. 3 Company ==
No. 3 Company was commanded by Captain William Allen and initially numbered 89 men. Around half of the initial complement were drawn from Chief Hlokolo's amaNgcolosi of the Inanda region. These men had reported for service at Fort Napier on 23 December. The remainder came from part of the levy provided by Chief Mahoyiza of the amaQanya. No. 3 Company was issued with a larger number of rifles than the other pioneer companies, with one in every five men being armed. The company left Pietermaritzburg on 3 or 4 January to report to Kranskop for service with Durnford's No. 2 Column.

No. 3 Company did not join Durnford's march to Isandlwana and so escaped the massacre at the camp. It remained with two battalions of the NNC at a camp just outside Kranskop and they became the only British troops available to defend the most likely axis of any Zulu counter-invasion of Natal, across the Middle Drift. No. 3 Company and the NNC were put to work entrenching the camp, which became Fort Cherry. On 20 March the company reported a total strength of 96 enlisted men (50 men of the amaQanya, 40 of the amaNgcolosi and 6 of the amaNgwi). In late March and early April the company helped prepare a track for wagons supporting a series of British raids into Zululand.

On 20 May, No. 3 Company deployed to support a British raid carried out as a distraction from Chelmsford's second invasion. The pioneers were in the vanguard of the crossing of the Thukela. When they were halfway across, on a sandy island, they were shot at by a group of 8-10 Zulu and the company returned fire which caused the Zulu to withdraw. The raid was a success with thirteen Zulu homesteads burnt for no loss and the party returned to Fort Cherry on 21 May. No. 3 Company and the rest of the garrison at Fort Cherry were unable to engage a Zulu counter-raid across Middle Drift on 25 June. The raiding party returned to Zululand with 678 cattle, 771 goats and around 40 civilian captives. No. 3 Company was moved to the British depot at Rorke's Drift on 4 July.

== See also ==
- South African Native Labour Corps which served from 1916 to 1918
- African Auxiliary Pioneer Corps which served from 1941 to 1949

== Bibliography ==
- Bancroft, James W. (1988). The Terrible Night at Rorke's Drift. Staplehurst, England: Spellmount. ISBN 9780870525711.
- Castle, Ian; Knight, Ian (1994). Fearful Hard Times: The Siege of and Relief of Eshowe 1879. London: Greenhill Books. ISBN 1-85367-180-0.
- Castle, Ian (2003). Zulu War: Volunteers, Irregulars & Auxiliaries. Oxford, England: Osprey. ISBN 9781841764849.
- Esposito, Gabriele (2025). The British Army of Queen Victoria, 1837–1901: Organization, Uniforms and Equipment. Barnsley, South Yorkshire: Pen and Sword. ISBN 978-1-0361-0331-6.
- French, Gerald (2014). Lord Chelmsford and the Zulu War. Barnsley, England: Pen and Sword. ISBN 9781783463237.
- Accounts and Papers of the House of Commons. London: Her Majesty's Stationery Office. 1879.
- Hope, Robert (1997). The Zulu War and the 80th Regiment of Foot. Leek, England: Churnet Valley Books. ISBN 9781897949245.
- Houle, Robert J. (2011). Making African Christianity: Africans Reimagining Their Faith in Colonial South Africa. Plymouth, Devon: Lehigh University Press. ISBN 978-1-61146-538-9.
- Hutchison, Ruth; Alexander, Peter F.; Schreuder, Deryck Marshall (1996). Africa Today: A Multi-disciplinary Snapshot of the Continent in 1995. Canberra: Humanities Research Centre, Australian National University. ISBN 978-0-7315-2491-4.
- Knight, Ian (2004). The National Army Museum Book of the Zulu War. London: Pan Books. ISBN 033-0-48629-2.
- Knight, Ian (2008). Companion to the Anglo-Zulu War. Barnsley, England: Pen and Sword. ISBN 9781844158010.
- Laband, John (2009). Historical Dictionary of the Zulu Wars. Lanham, Maryland: Scarecrow Press. ISBN 9780810863002.
- Morris, Donald R. (1965). The Washing Of The Spears: The Rise and Fall of the Zulu Nation. New York: Simon & Schuster. ISBN 067163108X.
- Okia, Opolot (2012). Communal Labor in Colonial Kenya: The Legitimization of Coercion, 1912–1930. Basingstoke, Hampshire: Palgrave Macmillan. ISBN 978-0-230-39296-0.
- Parker, John (2026). Great Kingdoms of Africa. Oakland, California: University of California Press. p. 253. ISBN 978-0-520-43023-5.
- Raugh, Harold E. (2004). The Victorians at War, 1815-1914: An Encyclopedia of British Military History. London: Bloomsbury Academic. ISBN 9781576079256.
- Rothwell, Captain J.S. (1989) [1881]. Narrative of the Field Operations Connected with the Zulu War of 1879. London: Greenhill Books. ISBN 1-85367-041-3. OL 8980321M – via Quartermaster General's Department, Intelligence Branch, War Office.
- Smith, Keith (2014). Dead Was Everything: Studies in the Anglo-Zulu War. Barnsley, England: Frontline Books. ISBN 978-1-4738-3723-2.
- Thompson, Paul Singer (2006). Black Soldiers of the Queen: the Natal Native Contingent in the Anglo-Zulu War. Tuscaloosa, Alabama: University of Alabama Press. ISBN 9780817353681.
- Wynne, Warren Richard Calvin (1995). "A Widow-making War": The Life and Death of a British Officer in Zululand, 1879. Nuneaton, England: Paddy Griffith Associates. ISBN 9780952148807.
