= Warren Richard Colvin Wynne =

British army officer (1843–1879)

W. R. C. Wynne
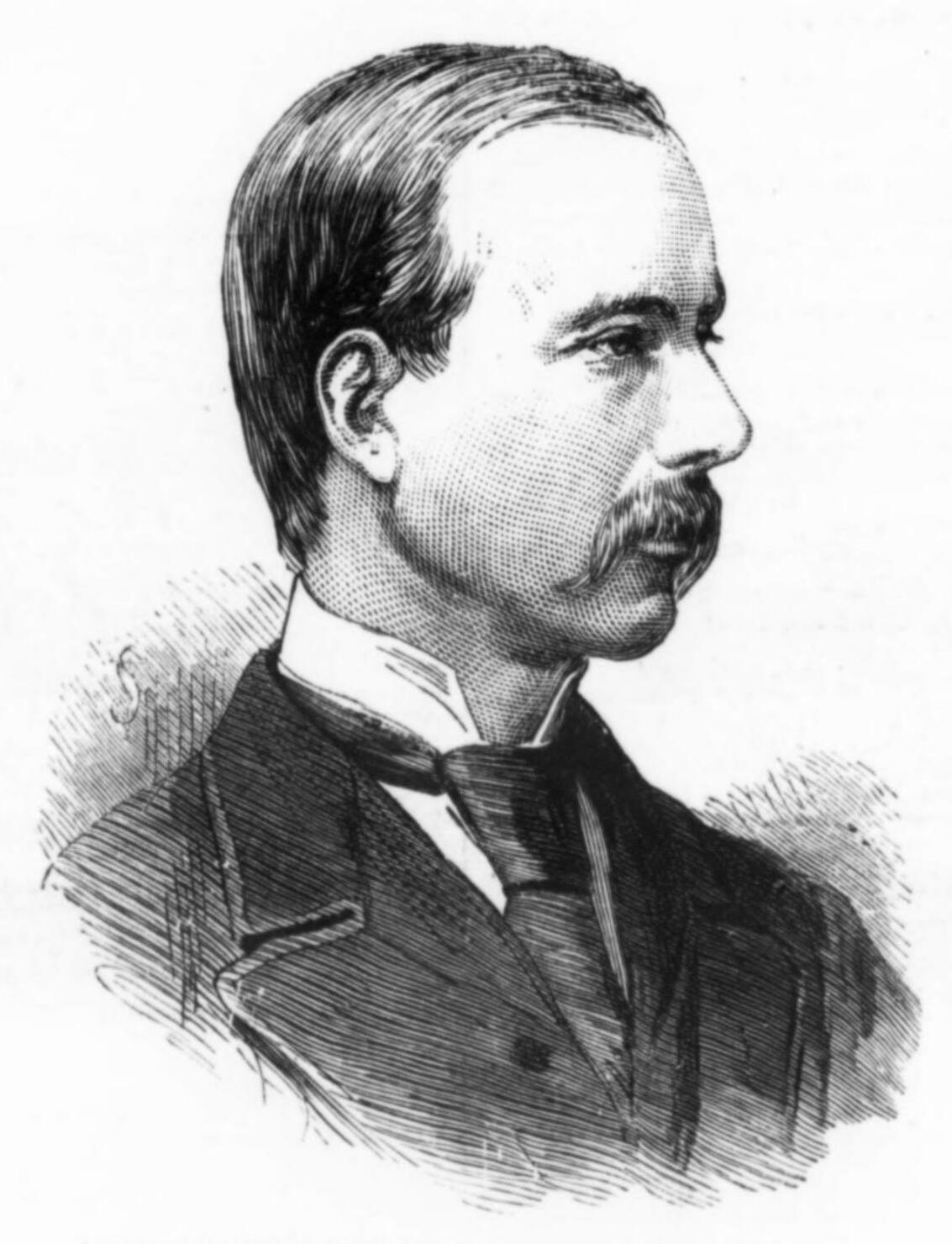
- Likeness, printed posthumously in The Illustrated London News, 14 June 1879
- Born: 9 April 1843; Collon, County Louth, Ireland
- Died: 9 April 1879 (aged 36); Fort Pearson, Natal
- Spouses: Eleanor Turbett (m. 1872; died 1873); Lucy Parish (m. 1876)
- Military career
- Allegiance: United Kingdom
- Service: British Army; Royal Engineers
- Service years: 1862–1879
- Rank: Captain; Bvt. Major
- Conflicts: Anglo-Zulu War; Siege of Ekowe

Warren Richard Colvin Wynne (9 April 1843 – 9 April 1879) was an Anglo-Irish officer in the British Army. He rose to the rank of captain, and ultimately brevet major, in the Royal Engineers. During the Zulu War of 1879, he oversaw the building of several forts, and died of a fever contracted during the defence of Ekowe.

== Origins ==
Warren Richard Colvin Wynne was born at Collon House, County Louth, on 9 April 1843. He was the eldest surviving son of Captain John Wynne, Royal Horse Artillery, of Wynnestay, Roebuck, County Dublin, by his wife, Anne, daughter of Admiral Sir Samuel Warren. He was descended from the Wynnes of Hazlewood, County Sligo, many of whom served as army officers.

== Career ==
After passing through the Royal Military Academy at Woolwich, he received a commission as lieutenant in the Royal Engineers on 25 June 1862. He served at various home stations, and then for five years at Gibraltar, where he acted as adjutant of his corps. He was appointed to the ordnance survey in the home counties on his return to England at the end of 1871. He was promoted to the rank of captain on 3 February 1875.

On 2 December 1878 he embarked in command of the 2nd Field Company of the Royal Engineers for Natal, part of the small number of reinforcements sent to the colony ahead of the Anglo-Zulu War of 1879. Following his arrival at Durban Wynne marched to join the first column as commanding Royal Engineer under Colonel (afterwards Sir) Charles Knight Pearson at the mouth of the Tugela River. He reached the column on 12 January and the following day crossed the river with them. There, in the presence of the enemy Wynne with his company of Royal Engineers, assisted by the line, laid out and built Fort Tenedos on the left bank of the Lower Tugela. The structure, large enough to shelter the entire column and a quantity of stores, was completed on the 17th.

The column then advanced further into Zululand. Wynne was in command of the right in Battle of Inyezane on 22 January. Wynne had been working to improve the drift to facilitate further crossings but upon hearing the action commence had his men drop their shovels and take up arms to serve as light infantry. On arrival at Ekowe (now called Eshowe), Wynne designed and built the fort there.

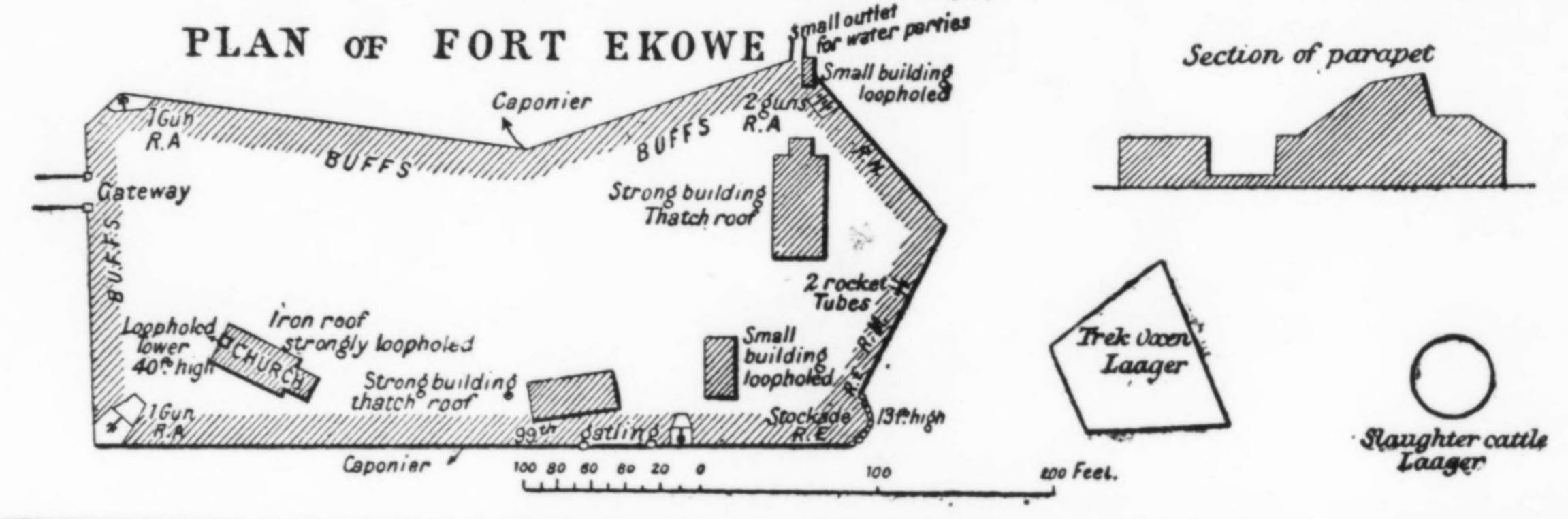
Plan of Fort Ekowe in The Illustrated London News, 26 April 1879

On 28 January 1879, the column received Lord Chelmsford's announcement that he was forced, on account of the Isandhlwana disaster, to retire to the frontier. Full discretion was given to Pearson to hold his position or retire to the Tugela. A majority of a council of war was in favour of retreat, when Wynne, mentioning that retreat would be hazardous, and its morale effect at such a juncture most detrimental, succeeded with the support of Colonel Walker and Captain H. G. MacGregor in securing a decision to remain at Ekowe. The construction of the fort continued with Wynne building a moat, drawbridge, gate and loopholed palisade.

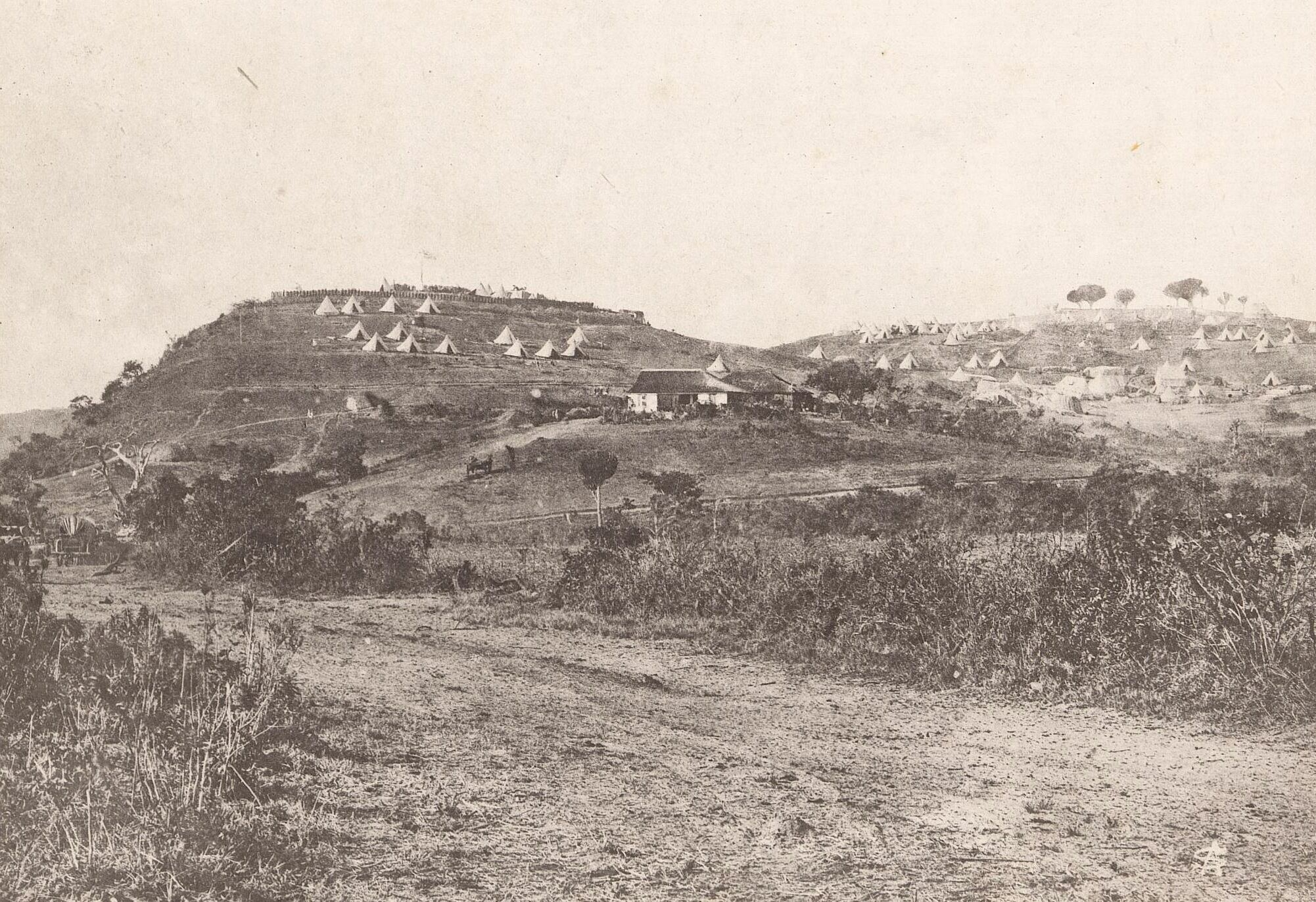
View of Fort Pearson, in or before 1880

On 1 March Wynne was engaged in a successful sortie to destroy a Zulu kraal, and commanded the right flank of the column on its return in an engagement with the enemy, his company again acting as light infantry. Hemmed in at Ekowe, and unable to get runners through to Lord Chelmsford, heliograph signals from Fort Pearson, on the Tugela opposite Fort Tenedos, were observed on the following day. Wynne, by now suffering from ill health due to his exertions in constructing the fort, attempted to construct a means of reply. His first attempt was a hot air balloon with a message attached but a change in the wind blew it off course and it was lost. A second attempt was a screen of black tarpaulin that would be swung up and down on a wooden frame to replicate heliograph messages, this was destroyed by a blast of wind. In the end an improvised heliograph was constructed by Captain Macgregor, one of Pearson's staff officers, using a shaving mirror and a section of gas pipe.

Wynne was tireless in laying down ranges, repairing approaches, or cutting down bush, always resourceful and cheerful, making the best of the means at hand; largely because of his skill and exertions the defence was a success. On one occasion, Wynne found that marker posts, used by the garrison to determine rifle ranges in case of attack and to delineate the route of a new approach road, were being moved at night by the Zulu. Wynne had his company rig the posts with explosives. Pearson, in his despatch, expressed his high opinion of Wynne's services.

On 12 March he was struck down with fever, the result of overwork. On the relief of Ekowe he was moved in a cart to the Tugela River, where, promoted brevet major a week before, he died at Fort Pearson on 9 April 1879, his 36th birthday. He was buried in the hillside cemetery overlooking the river and Fort Tenedos. His name was commemorated by his corps in Rochester Cathedral.

== Personal life ==
Wynne married first, in 1872, Eleanor (died 1873), third daughter of J. P. Turbett of Owenstown, County Dublin; and secondly, in 1876, Lucy, eldest daughter of Captain Alfred Parish, by whom he had three sons, who with their mother survived him.

Coat of arms of Wynne
Crest A wolf's head erased as in the arms. Escutcheon Vert, a chevron ermine between three wolves' heads erased argent. Motto Non sibi sed toto

== Sources ==
- Burke, Bernard (1899). A Genealogical and Heraldic History of the Landed Gentry of Ireland. 9th ed. London: Harrison & Sons. pp. 491–492.
- Greaves, Adrian (2005). Crossing the Buffalo: The Zulu War of 1879. London: Cassell. ISBN 978-0-3043-6725-2.
- Knight, Ian (2004). The National Army Museum Book of the Zulu War. Pan Books. ISBN 033-0-48629-2.
- Morris, Donald R. (1965). The Washing of the Spears. Pen and Sword. ISBN 067-1-63108-X.
- Vetch, R. H.; Falkner, James (2004). "Wynne, Warren Richard Colvin (1843–1879), army officer". Oxford Dictionary of National Biography (online ed.). Oxford University Press. doi:10.1093/ref:odnb/30161. (Subscription, Wikipedia Library access or UK public library membership required.)
- Wynne, Lucy, ed. (c. 1880). Memoir of Capt. W. R. C. Wynne, R.E.. Southampton: John Adams. Printed for private circulation only.
- The London Gazette. Issue 24723. 16 May 1879. pp. 3449–3455.
- "Obituary". The Times. 31 May 1879. p. 9.

Attribution:

- This article incorporates text from a publication now in the public domain: Vetch, Robert Hamilton (1900). "Wynne, Warren Richard Colvin". In Lee, Sidney (ed.). Dictionary of National Biography. Vol. 63. London: Smith, Elder & Co. p. 264.
