= HMS Active (1869) =

British Volage-class corvette

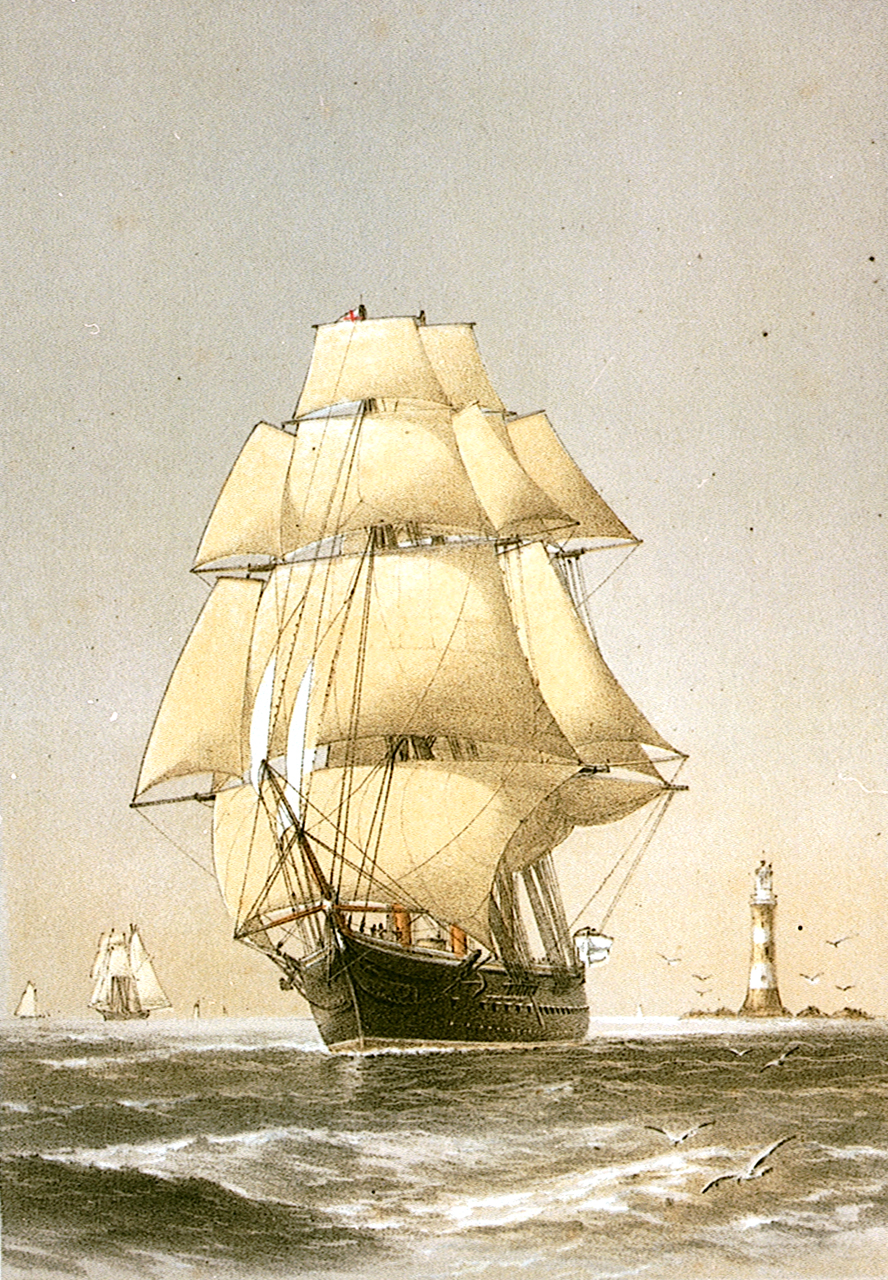
- Active

History

United Kingdom
- Name: Active
- Builder: Thames Ironworks and Shipbuilding Company, Blackwall, London
- Laid down: 1867
- Launched: 13 March 1869
- Commissioned: March 1871
- Decommissioned: 1898
- Fate: Sold for scrap, 10 July 1906

General characteristics (as built)
- Class & type: Volage-class iron screw corvette
- Displacement: 3,078 long tons (3,127 t)
- Tons burthen: 2,322 bm
- Length: 270 ft (82.3 m) (p/p)
- Beam: 42 ft 1 in (12.8 m)
- Draught: 21 ft 5 in (6.5 m)
- Installed power: 5 × rectangular boilers; 4,130 ihp (3,080 kW)
- Propulsion: 1 × propeller shaft; 1 × horizontal-return, connecting-rod steam engine
- Sail plan: Ship rig
- Speed: 15 knots (28 km/h; 17 mph)
- Range: 2,000 nmi (3,700 km; 2,300 mi) at 10 knots (19 km/h; 12 mph)
- Complement: 340
- Armament: 6 × 7 in (178 mm) rifled muzzle-loading guns; 4 × 6.3 in (160 mm) 64-pounder rifled muzzle-loading guns

HMS Active was a Volage-class corvette built for the Royal Navy in the late 1860s. Launched in 1869, she entered service in 1873, and was the commodore's ship on the Cape of Good Hope and West Africa Station. Her crew served ashore in both the Third Anglo-Ashanti and Zulu Wars. From 1885 to 1898, the ship was the flagship of the Training Squadron. Active was sold for scrap in 1906.

== Description ==
Active was 270 feet (82.3 m) long between perpendiculars and had a beam of 42 feet 1 inch (12.8 m). Forward the ship had a draught of 16 feet 5 inches (5.0 m), but aft she drew 21 ft 5 in (6.5 m). Active displaced 3,078 long tons (3,127 t) and had a burthen of 2,322 tons. Her iron hull was covered by a 3-inch (76 mm) layer of oak that was sheathed with copper from the waterline down to prevent biofouling. Watertight transverse bulkheads subdivided the hull. Her crew consisted of 340 officers and ratings.

The ship had one 2-cylinder horizontal-return, connecting-rod steam engine made by Humphreys and Tennant driving a single 19-foot (5.8 m) propeller. Five rectangular boilers provided steam to the engine at a working pressure of 30 psi (207 kPa; 2 kgf/cm^{2}). The engine produced a total of 4,130 indicated horsepower (3,080 kW) which gave Active a maximum speed of 15 knots (28 km/h; 17 mph). The ship carried 410 long tons (420 t) of coal, enough to steam 2,000 nautical miles (3,700 km; 2,300 mi) at 10 knots (19 km/h; 12 mph).

Active was ship rigged and had a sail area of 16,593 square feet (1,542 m^{2}). The lower masts were made of iron, but the remainder of the masts were wood. The ship's best speed under sail alone was 12.5 knots (23.2 km/h; 14.4 mph). Her funnel was semi-retractable to reduce wind resistance and her propeller could be hoisted up into the stern of the ship to reduce drag while under sail.

The ship was initially armed with a mix of 7-inch and 64-pounder 64 cwt (Note: "cwt" is the abbreviation for hundredweight, 64 cwt referring to the weight of the gun.) rifled muzzle-loading guns. The six 7-inch (178 mm) guns and two of the four 64-pounders were mounted on the broadside while the other two were mounted on the forecastle and poop deck as chase guns. In 1879, ten BL 6-inch 80-pounder breech-loading guns replaced all the broadside weapons. Two carriages for 14-inch (356 mm) torpedoes were added as well.

== Service ==
HMS Active was laid down in 1867 and launched on 13 March 1869. The ship was completed in March 1871 at a total cost of £126,156. Of this, £85,795 was spent on her hull and £40,361 on her machinery. Unlike her sister ship Volage, Active was placed in reserve after completion until 1873 when she was commissioned to serve as the flagship of the Commander-in-Chief, Cape of Good Hope and West Coast of Africa Station, Commodore William Hewett. The ship participated in naval operations during the Third Anglo-Ashanti War of 1874 and some of her crew were landed to reinforce the forces ashore. Commodore Francis Sullivan replaced Hewett in 1876 and he retained command until 1879 when the ship returned home to refit.

=== Zulu War ===
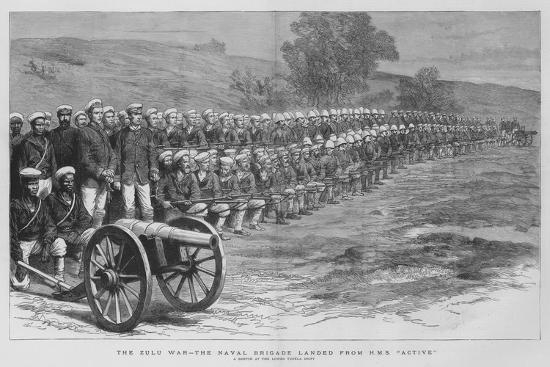
The Zulu War, the Naval Brigade landed from HMS Active, at the Lower Tugela Drift. The Graphic 1879

Between 19 November 1878 and 21 July 1879, during the Anglo-Zulu War, 173 men of Active (along with men from Tenedos, Shah and Boadicea) served ashore as part of an 858-man naval brigade. The group from Active comprised 10 officers, 100 seamen, 5 idlers, 42 Marines, 14 Kroomen, and 2 medical attendants. In addition to small arms, they were equipped with two 12-pounder breech-loading guns, 24-pounder rockets, and a Gatling gun. The 12-pounders were exchanged for two of the Army's 7-pounder mountain guns before entering Zululand.

Attached to the No.1 column commanded by Colonel Charles Pearson, they crossed the Tugela River from Natal into Zululand on 12 January 1879. On 22 January they saw action in the Battle of Inyezane, driving off an attacking force of Zulus with rockets, Martini-Henry rifles and the Gatling gun. The same day the British main force was defeated at the Battle of Isandlwana, and so Pearson's column advanced to Eshowe, where it was besieged for two months, until relieved on 3 April. In February, Active ran aground in Tugela Bay whilst assisting HMS Tenedos, which had also ran aground. They were refloated 36 hours later. During the campaign, Active's crew suffered only one man killed, and nine wounded in action against the enemy, while nine died of disease during the siege, and one man drowned while crossing the Tugela. In 1881 the South Africa Medal was awarded to those members of Active's crew that had served there.

=== Training Squadron ===
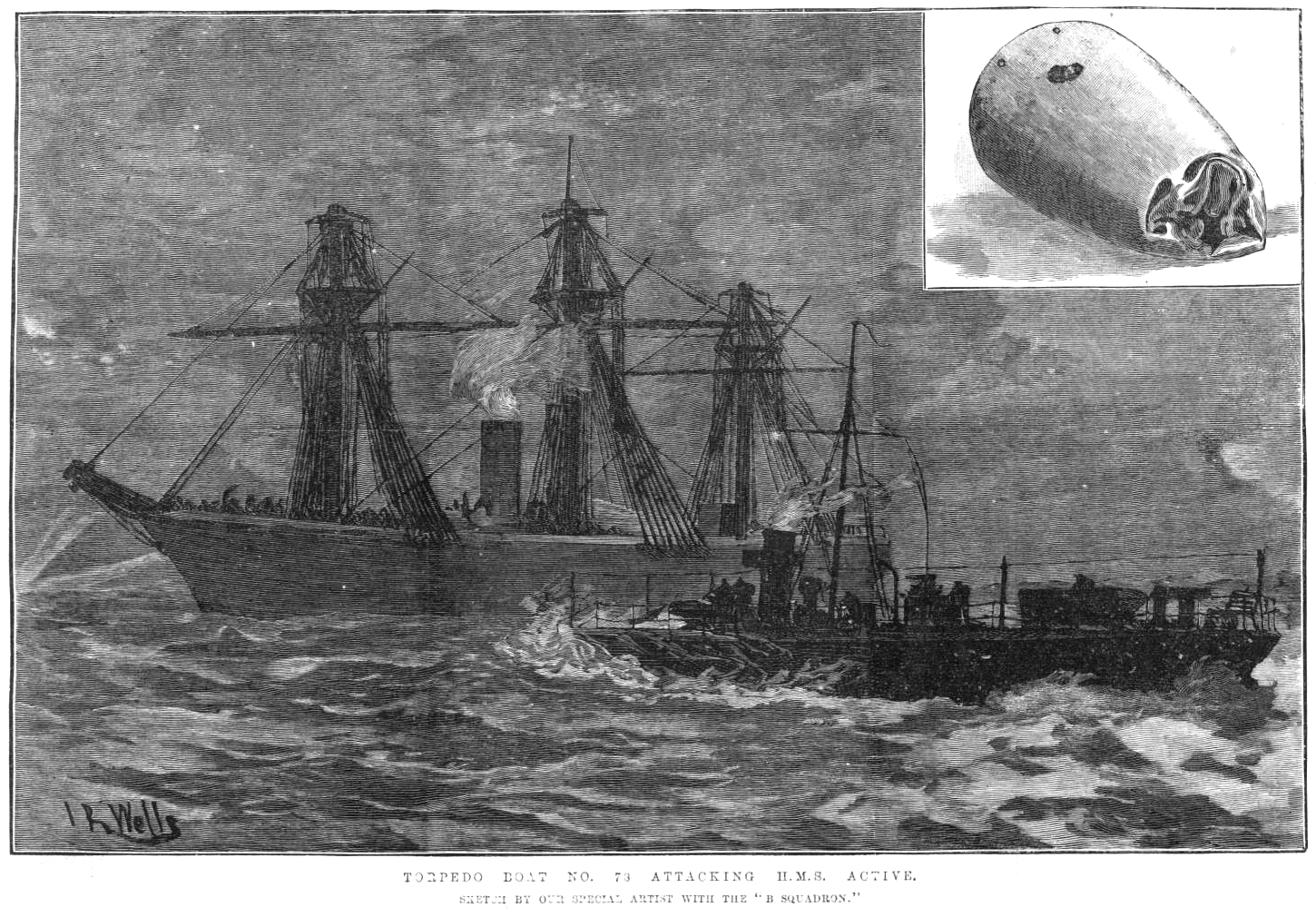
Torpedo Boat No 78 attacking Active during the Naval Manoeuvres of 1888, inset is a Whitehead Torpedo-head of soft metal, flattened by striking the ship

Active was rearmed and refitted in 1879 and placed in reserve until she was selected in 1885 to be the commodore's flagship in the newly formed Training Squadron. Active was the last square-rigged naval ship to leave Portsmouth Harbour under sail. She was paid off in 1898 and was sold for scrap on 10 July 1906.

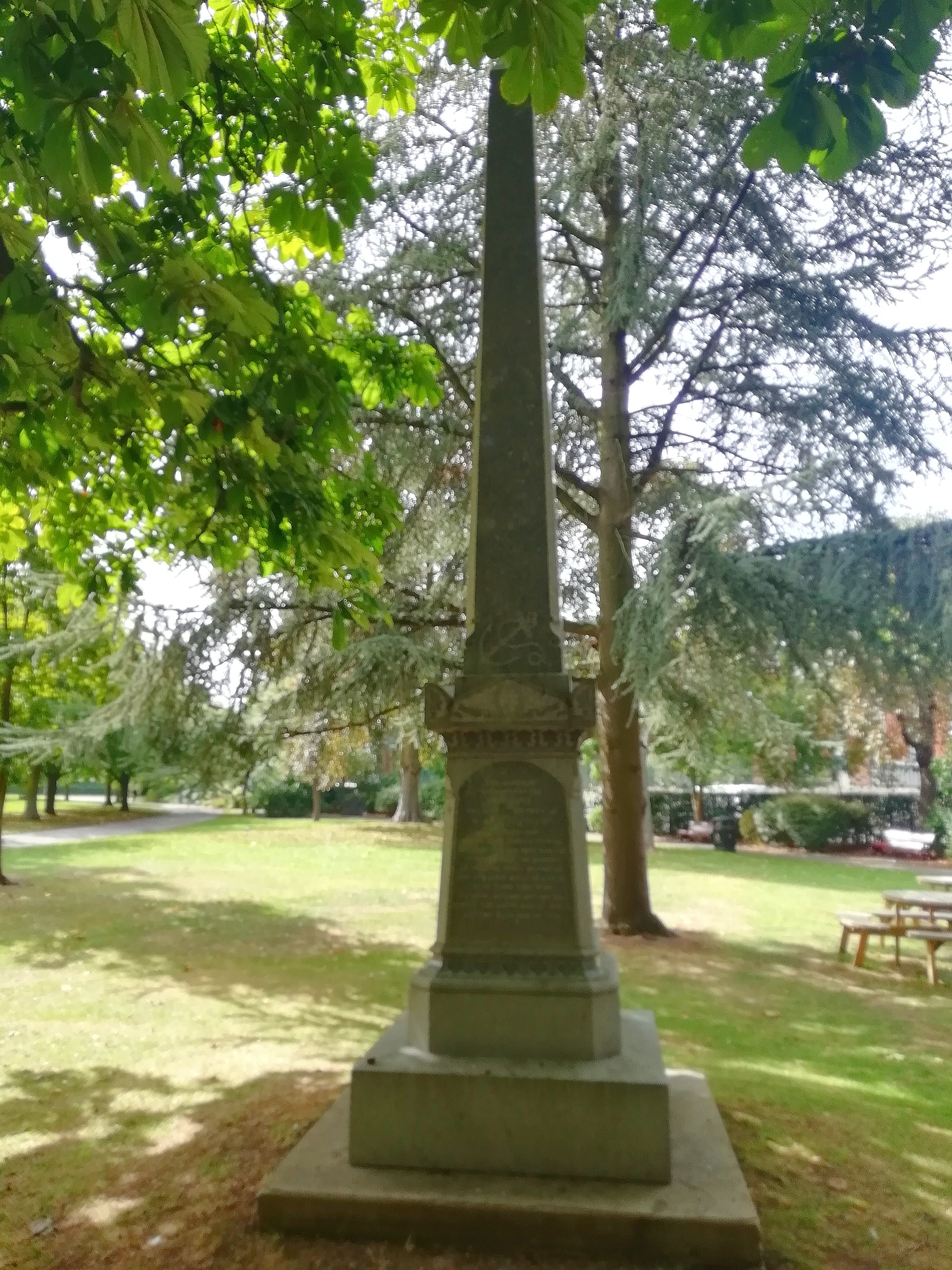
Hms Active monument in Portsmouth

A memorial to the men of Active who lost their lives during the African campaigns can be found in Victoria Park, Portsmouth.

== Bibliography ==
- Ballard, G. A. (1937). "British Corvettes of 1875: The Volage, Active and Rover". Mariner's Mirror. 23 (January). Cambridge, UK: Society for Nautical Research: 53–67.
- Lyon, David & Winfield, Rif (2004). The Sail and Steam Navy List: All the Ships of the Royal Navy 1815–1889. Chatham Publishing. ISBN 978-1-86176-032-6. OCLC 52620555.
