= Natal =

NATAL or Natal may refer to:

== Places ==
- Natal, Rio Grande do Norte, a city in Brazil
- Natal, South Africa (disambiguation), a region in South Africa
  - Natalia Republic, a former country (1839–1843)
  - Colony of Natal, a former British colony (1843–1910)
  - Natal (province), a former province (1910–1994)
  - KwaZulu-Natal, a province (since 1994)
- Mandailing Natal Regency, a regency in Indonesia
  - Natal, North Sumatra, a town in the above regency
- Natal, Iran, a village in Mazandaran Province, Iran
- Natal, British Columbia, a coal-mining community in the East Kootenay region of Canada

== Biology ==
- Of or relating to birth
  - Childbirth
- Natal banana frog, a species of frog (Afrixalus spinifrons)
- Natal dwarf puddle frog, a species of frog (Phrynobatrachus natalensis)
- Natal ghost frog, a species of frog (Heleophryne natalensis)
- Natal sand frog, a species of frog (Tomopterna natalensis)

== Military ==
- Ingobamakhosi Carbineers, an infantry regiment of the South African Army, formerly known as the Natal Carbineers
- King Cetshwayo Artillery Regiment, an artillery regiment of the South African Army,
- Queen Nandi Mounted Rifles, an armoured regiment of the South African Army, formerly known as the Natal Mounted Rifles
- Natal Native Contingent, a large force of black auxiliary soldiers in British South Africa during the 1879 Anglo-Zulu War
- Natal (ship), two warships

== Sports ==
- KwaZulu-Natal cricket team, South African cricket team

== Other ==
- "Natal" (song), a 1991 single by Chico & Roberta
- Natal de Carvalho Baroni (born 1945), Brazilian football player
- Natal Day, a civic holiday in Canada
- NATAL Israel, Israel's Trauma Center for Victims of Terror and War
- Natal Observatory, an astronomical observatory in the Colony of Natal from 1882 to 1911
- Apostolic Vicariate of Natal, a former Catholic missionary jurisdiction, South Africa
- Kinect (code name Project Natal), a motion-based control system for the Xbox 360 video game console
- Roman Catholic Archdiocese of Natal, archdiocese in Brazil
- University of Natal, South Africa
