= Battle of Gingindlovu =

Battle of the Anglo-Zulu War

Battle of Gingindlovu (uMgungundlovu)
- Part of the Anglo-Zulu War
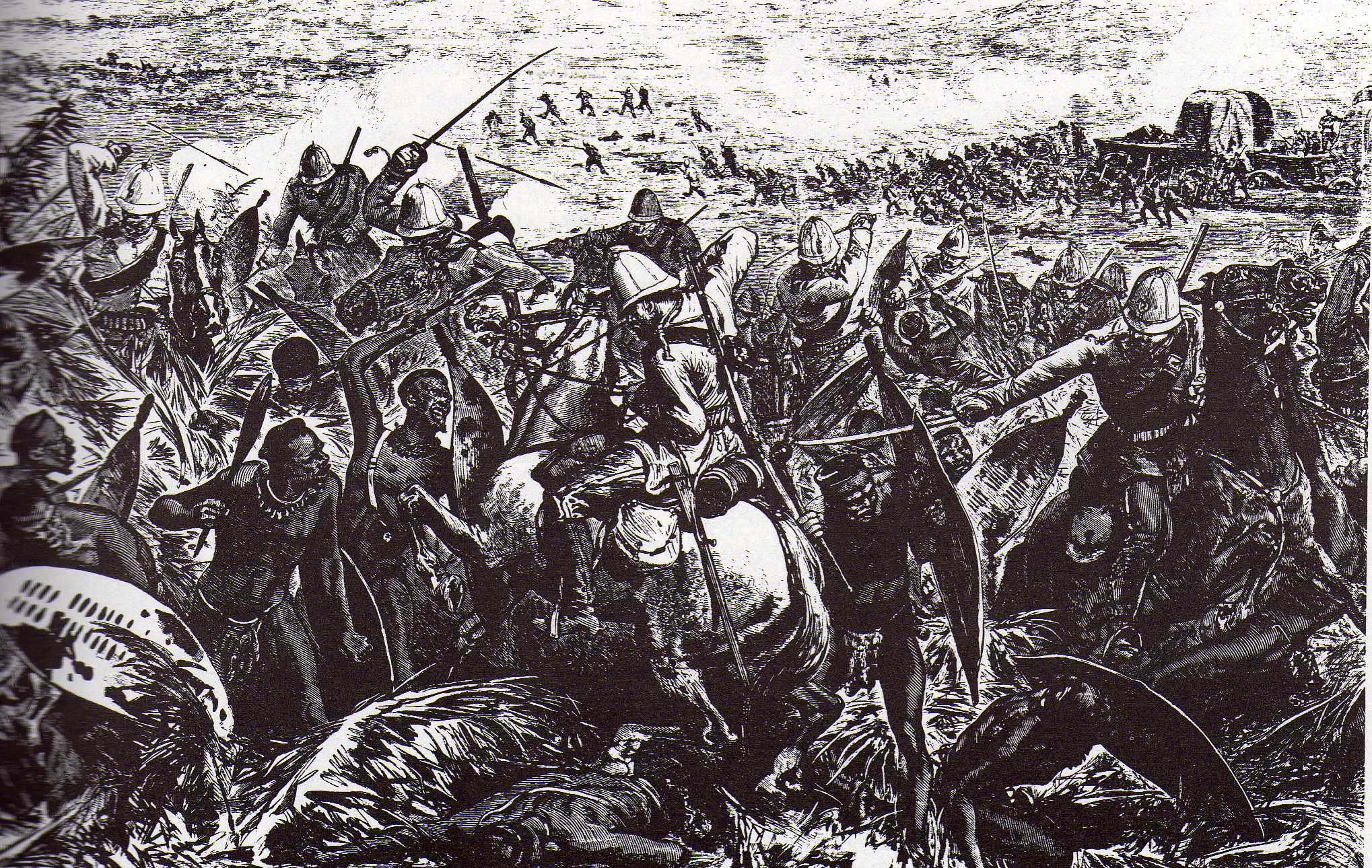
- The final repulse of the Zulus at Ginghilovo, from a sketch supplied by Lieutenant-Colonel J. North Crealock
Date	2 April 1879
Location	South bank of the Inyezane River 29.0117°S 31.579118°E
Result	British victory

Belligerents
British Empire	Zulu Kingdom

Commanders and leaders
Lord Chelmsford	Somopho kaZikhala; Dabulamanzi kaMpande

Strength
5,670; 2 × 9-pounder guns 4 × 24-pound rocket battery 2 × Gatling Guns	11,000

Casualties and losses
11 killed 62 wounded	1,000+ killed

The Battle of Gingindlovu (uMgungundlovu) was fought on 2 April 1879 between a British relief column sent to break the Siege of Eshowe and a Zulu impi of King Cetshwayo.

== Background ==
Charles Pearson had led No. 1 Column of the British invasion force across the Tugela River to establish an advanced base at Eshowe. Having set up a base at a deserted Norwegian mission station, the British found themselves besieged. A relief column was organised by Lord Chelmsford and departed Fort Tenedos on 29 March to relieve the garrison. Chelmsford had a relief force of 400 men from HMS Shah, 200 from Boadicea with a couple of Gatling guns, along with 57th Regiment of Foot, the 91st Highlanders and the 60th Rifles, the Natal Native Contingent (NNC) and a mounted force commanded by Major Barrow. The column comprised 3,390 Europeans and 2,280 Africans, two 9-pounder guns (4 kg), four 24-pounder (11 kg) rocket tubes and the two Gatling guns.

On 29 March the relief operation began, the force being ferried across the Tugela river. Despite travelling light, with no baggage or tents, progress was slow. Chelmsford took a route further to the east than Pearson, to avoid ambush in the close country Pearson had passed through. Rivers were swollen by the rains which fell each night and fearing a repeat of Isandlwana, Chelmsford ensured his men spent much time laagering and entrenching their camp at the end of each day and kept ammunition boxes open. Despite this slow progress, Pearson's observers at Eshowe could see the relief column laagering on the south bank of the Neyzane (now Inyezane) on the evening of 1 April. The laager was sited on a 300 ft (91 m) ridge running roughly west–east. West of the ridge, the ground dipped, only to rise again to the 470 ft (140 m) Umisi Hill.

== Prelude ==
The ground sloped away in all directions, allowing a good field of fire. A trench surrounded a waist-high wall of earth, which enclosed 120 wagons, forming a square with sides 130 yd (120 m) long. While these defences were being constructed, mounted scouts spotted small parties of Zulus beyond Umisi Hill. That evening, a mist covered the valley and John Dunn made a reconnaissance, convinced that the mist concealed Zulu campfires. Accompanied by Captain William Molyneux of Lord Chelmsford's staff, Dunn make his way to the Ineyzane, which he swam across to examine the ground beyond. Dunn found an impi camp and narrowly avoided detection before rejoining Molyneux and reporting to Chelmsford. This impi was composed of 12,000 warriors, some of whom were Isandlwana veterans drawn from regiments in the main Zulu army, while the remainder were warriors who lived in the vicinity of Eshowe. Some of the Zulu commanders wanted to attack Chelmsford's forces that night, but Prince Dabulamanzi kaMpande, half-brother of King Cetshwayo and commander of the impi's right wing, convinced them to wait until morning.

== Battle ==
Men of the 57th Regiment entrenching a laager.

At dawn on 2 April 1879, the morning sun revealed muddy ground and a thick mist. Chelmsford had decided, after hearing Dunn's report, not to continue toward Eshowe early the next morning. Instead, he would deploy units of the NNC to feel for the Zulus. As the NNC were preparing to advance, shots were heard from the night pickets still on duty. The impi was advancing; the main force split into two columns before crossing the Ineyzane and assuming the "chest and horns" formation. The left horn sharply curved to the right to assault the north-east corner of the laager, while the "chest" gently curved towards its the north face. Another force passed Misi Hill and approached the laager, forming the right horn of the impi.

The Bull's Head formation came at a run on the three sides of the laager as Chelmsford had wanted; at a range of 300–400 yd (270–370 m) the British infantry opened fire, supported by the Gatling guns and rockets. Zulu marksmen caused a few casualties within the laager but the defenders kept the Zulus at bay. Though the Zulu regiments made persistent rushes to get within stabbing range, their charges lacked the drive and spirit that had pushed them forward at the Battle of Isandlwana and Rorke's Drift. The only Zulu to reach the laager was a 10-year-old boy, who was taken prisoner by members of the naval brigade and later served as a mascot on their ship, Boadicea. Around 7:00 a.m., the impi had been halted but had not withdrawn. Chelmsford ordered his mounted troops to attack, soon followed by the NNC, John Dunn's scouts and the Boadicea commander with his flag-lieutenant. Many Zulu were killed as they swiftly retreated, though some turned and fought their pursuers.

== Aftermath ==
=== Analysis ===
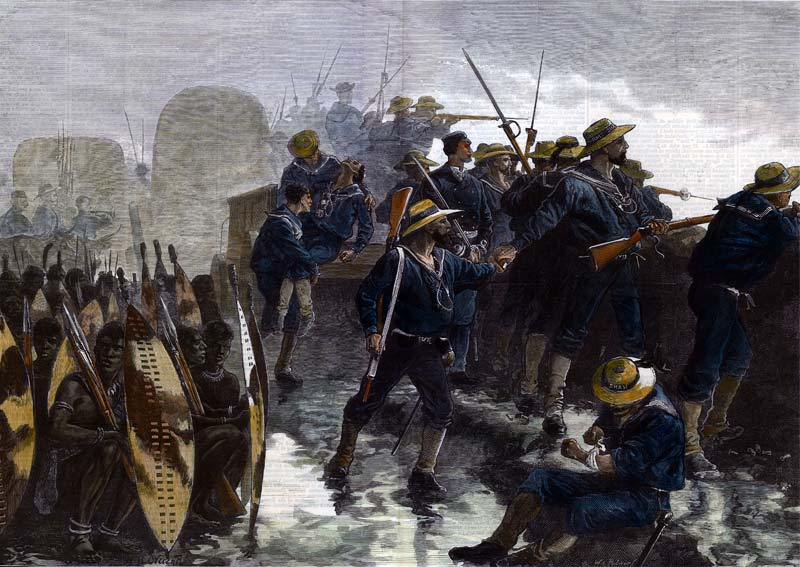
Sailors from HMS Shah defending one side of the British Square during the Battle of Gingindlovu, from a sketch by Lieutenant Smith-Dorrien, RN.

The battle restored Chelmsford's confidence in his army and its ability to defeat Zulu attacks. With the last resistance between Chelmsford and Pearson's columns removed, he was able to advance and raise the siege of Eshowe.

=== Casualties ===
By 7:30 a.m., the Zulus had fled, leaving 1,100 dead and wounded behind; the British began to kill the Zulu wounded. Around the laager 700 Zulu bodies were counted and 300 more were killed during the pursuit. The British suffered two officers and nine men killed, including a lieutenant-colonel; four officers and fifty men were wounded.

== See also ==
- Military history of South Africa

== Bibliography ==
- Colenso, Frances E. (1880). History of the Zulu War and Its Origin. Assisted by Edward Durnford. London: Chapman & Hall. OCLC 251961801 – via Archive Foundation.
- Castle, Ian; Knight, Ian (1994). Fearful Hard Times: The Siege and Relief of Eshowe, 1879. Mechanicsburg, PA: Greenhill Books. ISBN 978-1-85367-180-7.
- Greaves, Adrian (2012). Forgotten Battles of the Zulu War. Barnsley: Pen & Sword Military. ISBN 978-1-84884-746-0.
- Laband, John (2009). Historical Dictionary of the Zulu Wars. Lanham, MD: Scarecrow Press. ISBN 978-0-8108-6078-0.
- Theal, George McCall (1919). "XIV, The Zulu War". History of South Africa from 1873–1884: Twelve Eventful Years with Continuation of the History of Galekaland, Tembuland, Pondoland, and Betshuanaland until the Annexation of those Territories to the Cape Colony, and of Zululand until its Annexation to Natal. Vol. I. London: George Allen and Unwin. p. 334. OCLC 988723011 – via Archive Foundation.
