= List of British Army formations during the Victorian era =

This is a list of British divisions formed during the Victorian era. During this period, divisions were raised on an ad hoc basis for a particular conflict. Not all of them are seen as being connected to the divisions raised by the British Army in the 20th Century. For example, Everard Wyrall, the official historian of the 2nd Division during the First World War, described the division's lineage as only including the Crimean and the Second Boer War.

== Eighth Xhosa War ==
Divisions
Formation name	Created	Ceased to exist	Locations served	Notes	Ref
1st Division					
2nd Division	1851	1851	Cape Colony	A 1,250 strong 2nd Division was organised in 1851 under Colonel George Mackinnon	

== Second Opium War ==
This force was raised from the Presidency armies and British forces based in India.

Divisions
Formation name	Created	Ceased to exist	Locations served	Notes	Ref
1st Division					
2nd Division				Major-General Robert Napier commanded a division made up of British and Indian forces	

== Second Anglo-Afghan War ==
This force was raised from the Presidency armies and British forces based in India.

Divisions
Formation name	Created	Ceased to exist	Locations served	Notes	Ref
1st Division					
2nd Division					

== Anglo-Zulu War ==
Divisions
Formation name	Created	Ceased to exist	Locations served	Notes	Ref
1st Division	1879	1879	Natal colony, Zululand	Also known as No. 1 Division. The division, under the command of Major-General Henry Hope Crealock was formed from troops that had arrived in southern Africa. At the start of the campaign, it comprised 6,508 Imperial and irregulars and 2,707 men of the Natal Native Contingent.	
2nd Division	1879	1879	Natal colony, Zululand	Also known as No. 2 Division. The division, under the command of Major-General Edward Newdegate, was formed from troops that had arrived in southern Africa. At the start of the campaign, it comprised 6,867 Imperial and irregulars and 3,371 men of the Natal Native Contingent.	

== Anglo-Egyptian War ==
Divisions
Formation name	Created	Ceased to exist	Locations served	Notes	Ref
1st Division	1882	1882	Egypt	During August 1882, the division was formed from troops that had arrived in Egypt. It was placed under the command of Lieutenant-General George Willis	
2nd Division	1882	1882	Egypt	During August 1882, the division was formed from troops that had arrived in Egypt. It was placed under the command of Lieutenant-General Edward Bruce Hamley	
Cavalry Division	1882	1882	Egypt	During August 1882, the division was formed from troops that had arrived in Egypt. It was placed under the command of Major-General Drury Drury-Lowe	
