= Gillian Chaplin =

New Zealand photographic artist and curator

- Born: 1948 (age 77–78); South Africa
- Known for: Photography

Gillian Chaplin (born 1948) is a New Zealand photographic artist and curator. Her works are held in the collections of Museum of New Zealand Te Papa Tongarewa and Auckland Art Gallery Toi o Tāmaki.

== Biography ==
Chaplin was born in Natal, South Africa in 1948, and emigrated to New Zealand in 1961. She completed a Master of Fine Arts at Elam in 1979.

In 1987 Chaplin came third in the Goodman Fielder Wattie Book Awards for her work Ngā Mōrehu: The Survivors, which was produced in collaboration with Judith Binney.

Chaplin was appointed Education Officer of the Auckland City Art Gallery in 1983, working on a programme which aimed to make art more accessible to the public. The main feature of this programme was to employ volunteer docents trained as guides to gallery visitors.

In 1990, Chaplin's work Mist Areas won the United/Sarjeant photographic award. Five photographers withdrew their works from the exhibition at the Sarjeant Gallery in protest at the one-person judging panel, Rodney Wilson, citing a conflict of interest. Wilson was a former colleague of Chaplin from the Auckland City Art Gallery. The artists who withdrew were Ans Westra, Neil Pardington, Anne Noble, Marie Shannon and Laurence Aberhart.

Double Doors: an Artist in Focus exhibition at Auckland Art Gallery Toi o Tāmaki in August 1983, in collaboration with Barbara Tuck. By chance, the two artists discovered they were both making small boxes as a framework for sculptural assemblages. Previously Chaplin had concentrated on photography and Tuck on painting, but in this departure from their usual fields of work they found common ground and began work on a shared installation. About twenty small boxes were treated by each artist, and for the installation they were alternated on a long narrow table. Chairs placed around the outside encouraged people to take their time in contemplating the works. The works referenced the Surrealists, in particular the boxes of Joseph Cornell, but with a more feminine viewpoint.
