= Dabulamanzi kaMpande =

Zulu commander (1839-1886)

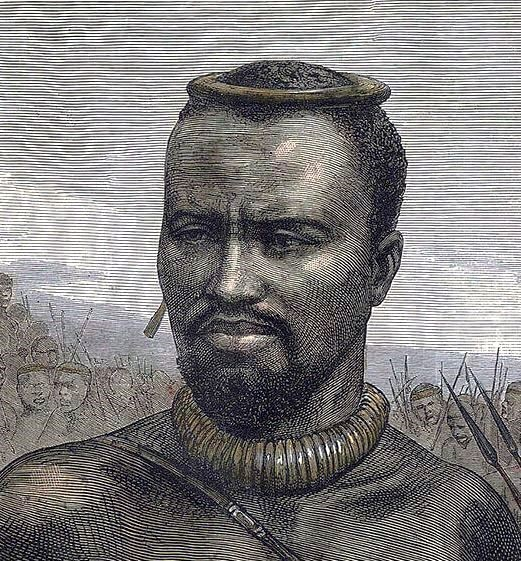
- Depiction of Dabulamanzi from the Illustrated London News
- Born: c. 1839
- Died: September 22, 1886 (aged 46–47)
- Children: Prince Bangani KaDabulamanzi
- Military career
- Allegiance: Zulu Kingdom
- Rank: Commander of the Undi corps
- Conflicts: Anglo-Zulu War: Battle of Isandlwana; Siege of Eshowe; Battle of Rorke's Drift; Battle of Gingindlovu

Dabulamanzi kaMpande (c. 1839 – September 22, 1886) was a Zulu commander for the Zulu kingdom in the Anglo-Zulu War. He is most noted for having commanded the Zulus at the Battle of Rorke's Drift. He was a half-brother of the Zulu king Cetshwayo.

After the defeat of the Zulus, and the deposition of Cetshwayo, Dabulamanzi campaigned for the return of his brother to power. When Cetshwayo was restored in 1883, Dabulamanzi fought on his behalf to maintain the unity of the Zulu kingdom. Dabulamanzi means, ‘the one who conquers the waters’.

== Life ==
His father was the previous Zulu king Mpande, which made him a half-nephew of the famous and legendary Shaka and younger half-brother of the ruler Cetshwayo. His mother was Sanguza, one of Mpande's many wives. One of his sons was Prince Bangani KaDabulamanzi. Prince Bangani's son was Prince Joseph Gabriel Lamthuthu.

=== Anglo-Zulu war ===
Dabulamnzi was present at the Battle of Isandlwana, where he led the Undi Corps reserves, but did not see much participation. He took the reserve forces and led the Zulu at the Battle of Rorke's Drift, despite his older brother specifically instructing him not to attack the British outside Zulu territory. Dabulamanzi's tactics were ineffective, allowing the small British force at Rorke's Drift to repel the Zulus.

Dabulamanzi subsequently organized the Siege of Eshowe, alongside Mavumengwana kaNdlela Ntuli, forming a blockade at Fort Eshowe which isolated British troops, under the command of Charles Pearson for two months. When Lord Chelmsford arrived with a relief force, Dabulamanzi led the right wing of the Zulu army at the Battle of Gingindlovu; the Zulus were defeated.

=== Later career ===
Dabulamanzi became the focal figure of anti-British sentiment in the aftermath of the war, and was a vocal opponent of Theophilus Shepstone and John Robert Dunn, Cetshwayo's former adviser who sided with the British and acquired large landholdings after the British victory. Dabulamanzi was keen to ensure his brother's return to power in Zululand. Conflicts between rival factions prompted the British to re-establish Cetshwayo as king in an attempt to restore order, but the conflicts continued.

Dabulamanzi led the fight against Cetshwayo's principal enemy Zibhebhu kaMaphitha, who was supported by Boer mercenaries. In 1883, Dabulamanzi was defeated by Zibhebhu in the Battle of Msebe and at oNdini. After Cetshwayo's death he supported the king's son Dinuzulu, negotiating an alliance with Boer mercenaries in 1884. The exorbitant demands for land by the mercenaries led to further conflicts. On 22 September 1886, he was shot dead during a scuffle with a group of Boers.
