= Natal (ship) =

Natal is the name of several ships:

- HMS Natal (1905), a Duke of Edinburgh-class cruiser launched on 30 September 1905 and sunk by an internal explosion in the Cromarty Firth on 30 December 1915.
- HMSAS Natal (K10), a Loch-class frigate, previously HMS Loch Cree (K430), renamed in 1944 and commissioned into the South African Navy later that year. She was converted to a survey ship in 1957 and decommissioned and sunk as a target off the Cape of Good Hope in 1972.

== See also ==
- Media related to Natal Queen (ship, 1866) at Wikimedia Commons
- Media related to K430 Natal (ship, 1945) at Wikimedia Commons
- Media related to Natal (ship, 1964) at Wikimedia Commons
- Media related to Natal (ship, 1983) at Wikimedia Commons
- Natal (disambiguation)
