= Battle of Inyezane =

1879 battle of the Anglo-Zulu War

- Part of the Anglo-Zulu War
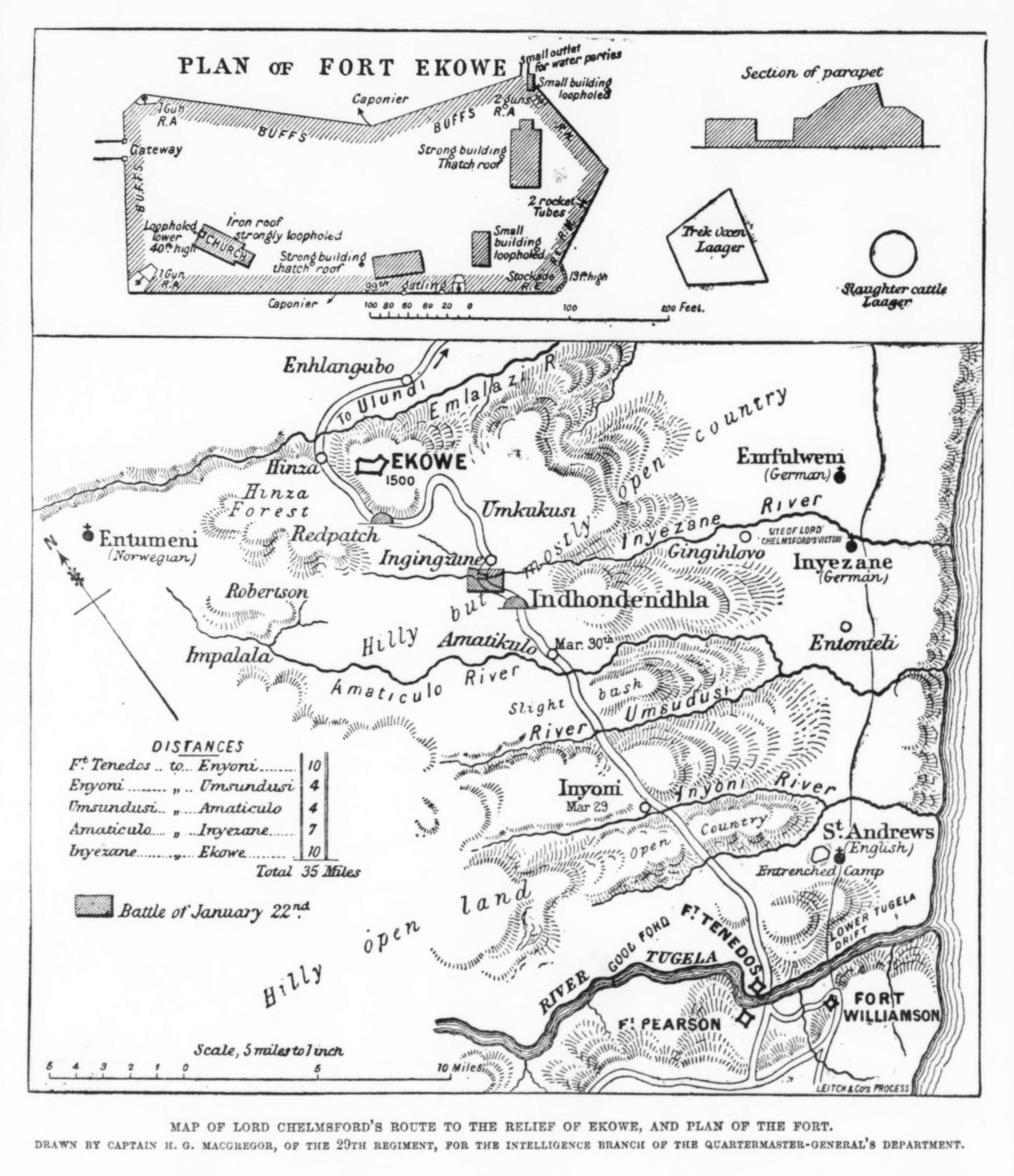
- Map showing Inyezane
Date	22 January 1879
Location	North bank of the Inyezane River 28°57′2″S 31°32′36″E
Result	British victory

Belligerents
British Empire	Zulu Kingdom

Commanders and leaders
Charles Pearson	Godide kaNdlela

Strength
2,758; 4 × 7-pounder guns; 1 × 24-pound rocket battery; 1 × Gatling Gun	6,000

Casualties and losses
Killed: 10 Europeans, NNC: 5; 16–20 wounded	300–600 killed; 2 prisoners

The Battle of Inyezane, was a British victory early in the Anglo-Zulu war of 1879.

== Background ==
In December 1878, the British invasion force assembled on the Zululand borders in five columns. Column No. 2 (under Anthony Durnford) and Column No. 5 were allocated a defensive role. The remaining three columns advanced on the Zulu capital Ulundi (oNdini) from three sides and crossed the Zulu border between 6 and 12 January 1879. In the north, No. 4 (Left Flank) Column crossed the Blood River into Zululand on 6 January. No. 3 (Centre) Column (accompanied and effectively commanded by Lord Chelmsford) crossed into Zulu territory across Rorke's Drift following the expiry of the British ultimatum, on 11 January 1879. A day later No. 1 (Right Flank) Column (Colonel Pearson), began to cross into Zulu territory to advance along the coast. On 17 January 1879, the Zulu army marched out from the royal homesteads at Ulundi. On 18 January 1879, the Zulu force divided, the main section (some 25,000 strong) led by Ntshingwayo kaMahole and Mavumengwana kaNdlela, advanced west towards Rorke's Drift, while a smaller detachment (3,000–4,000 men) under Godide kaNdlela moved south to support Zulu forces harassing Pearson's advance.

Column No. 1 advanced north slowly, with 384 heavy wagons pulled by more than 1,000 oxen that had to cross several rivers along the way. Getting over the Tugela river (the southern border of Zululand) by ferry at Fort Pearson took from 12 to 16 January. On the northern bank Pearson erected Fort Tenedos to protect the ferry, that was finished by 18 January. From there, Pearson split his forces into two divisions, to advance faster with lighter units, cavalry and pioneers in the first division and prepare the river crossings on their way for the slow and heavy wagon train, covered by the second division. In the mid-morning of 22 January, about 6,000 Zulu, led by Godide, intercepted Pearson's column during the crossing of the river Inyezane, on its northern bank.

== Opposing forces ==
=== No. 1 Column ===
No. 1 Column had about 4,750 men, including 4,271 fighting troops and 384 wagons with more than 500 civilian drivers, under the command of Colonel Charles Pearson. It included two battalions of British infantry, eight companies of the 2nd Battalion, 3rd Regiment (749 officers and men) and six companies of the 99th Regiment (515 men) along with more than 200 sailors from the Naval Brigade, the foot troops supported by two 7-pounder field guns, a Gatling gun and a company of Royal Artillery with two 7-pounders. There were also about 312 European horse, including Imperial mounted infantry and colonial volunteer cavalry of the Victoria Mounted Rifles (47 men), Stanger Mounted Rifles (37 men) and Natal Hussars (39 men).

Local auxiliary troops included a company of pioneers (104 men) and two battalions of the 2nd Regiment of the Natal Native Contingent, some 2,256 men in 20 companies, each comprising three European officers and six NCOs, ten African NCOs armed with rifles and 90 African spearmen. The cavalry was commanded by Major Percy Harrow Stanley Barrow, the 2nd Regiment NNC by Major Shapland Graves, and the native pioneers by Captain Gilbert K.E. Beddoes. A company of sailors and several companies of the NNC were left to garrison Fort Pearson on the south bank of the Tugela River and another company of sailors and two companies of the 99th Regiment were left in Fort Tenedos, on the northern bank of Tugela.

From there, No. 1 Column advanced to Eshowe in two divisions. Concentrating on the right bank of the Tugela River, the first division had approximately 2,758 men, 400 from six companies of the 2nd Battalion, 3rd Regiment, 160 from three companies of the 99th Regiment, 138 Naval Brigade (Blue Jackets), men from HMS Active with two 7-pounders, one Gatling gun and a Hale rocket tube, 23 men of the Royal Artillery with two 7-pounders, 90 Royal Engineers, 115 local mounted infantry, 117 Colonial troopers, 1,655 men of the 2nd Regiment, Natal Native Contingent and 60 of 2 Company, Natal Native Pioneers.

=== Zulu Forces ===
An impi consisting of around 6,000 Zulu warriors under Godide kaNdlela was poised to oppose the British. They were a mix of old and young warriors, drawn from the uDlambedlu, izinGulube, iNsukamngeni, iQwa, uDududu, and iNdabakawombe regiments.

== Battle ==
Shortly after 08:00 a small number of Zulus appeared near the knoll on the ridge and a company of the Natal Native Contingent (NNC), under Lieutenant Fitzroy Hart, were sent up the spur after them. While this company gave chase a mass of Zulus appeared over the crest of the ridge and began pouring downwards. These men were the left horn of a 6,000 strong impi which was preparing to attack the British camp, and it had been provoked by the advance of Lieutenant Hart's company into launching a premature attack. In the face of the left horn's advance, the NNC fled, leaving their European officers and NCOs to make a fruitless stand before being swept aside.

As soon as Hart and his men began firing, the camp prepared for defence, forming a hasty firing line. The naval contingent and two companies of Buffs with a Gatling gun and several 7-pounders moved up to the knoll, opening up across the advancing Zulu column. When the Zulus emerged from scrub and began their assault on the camp, they were subjected to massed fire from the flank and front; the Zulus wavered and then withdrew the way they had come.

While the left horn was being repulsed, the rest of the Zulu impi appeared over the crest. The kraal was taken and switching their guns to concentrate on it, the British force that had attacked the flank of the left horn advanced up the slope and captured the kraal. This position allowed the British to move the Gatling gun onto the crest where its rapid fire soon drove the Zulus off the centre and left end of the ridge, as the British mounted troops came up the right-hand spur to complete the action.

== Aftermath ==
Pearson had lost a total of twelve men killed and twenty wounded (two of whom would later die at Eshowe). The Zulus lost over 400 dead and suffered hundreds more wounded. During a two-hour halt the British dead were buried, and some of Pearson's men tended to the Zulu wounded (acts of compassion not to be found later in the Zulu War). Pearson then resumed his march, bivouacking four miles from the battlefield before marching on to Eshowe the next day.

== Bibliography ==
- Castle, Ian; Ruggeri, Raffaele (2003). Zulu War - Volunteers, Irregulars & Auxiliaries. Men-at-Arms (No. 388). Oxford: Osprey. ISBN 978-1-84-176484-9.
- Castle, Ian; Knight, Ian (1994). Fearful Hard Times: The Siege and Relief of Eshowe. London: Greenhill Books. ISBN 978-1-85-367180-7.
- Knight, Ian (2003). The Zulu War 1879. Essential Histories No.56. Oxford: Osprey. ISBN 978-1-84-176612-6.
- Knight, Ian (2013). British Infantryman versus Zulu Warrior: Anglo-Zulu War, 1879. Combat No. 3. Oxford: Osprey. ISBN 978-1-78200-365-6.
- Laband, John (2009). Historical Dictionary of the Zulu Wars. Historical Dictionaries of War, Revolution and Civil Unrest. Lanham, Md: Scarecrow Press. ISBN 978-0-8108-6078-0.
- Morris, Donald R. (1988). The Washing of the Spears: The Rise and Fall of the Zulu Nation Under Shaka and its Fall in the Zulu War of 1879. London: Cardinal. ISBN 978-0-74-740194-0.
- Thompson, Paul Singer (2006). Black Soldiers of the Queen: The Natal Native Contingent in the Anglo-Zulu War (Rev. ed.). Tuscaloosa, AL: University of Alabama Press. ISBN 978-0-8173-5368-1.
