= Fort Pearson =

Fort in modern-day South Africa

Coordinates: 29°12′49.4″S 31°25′58.9″E

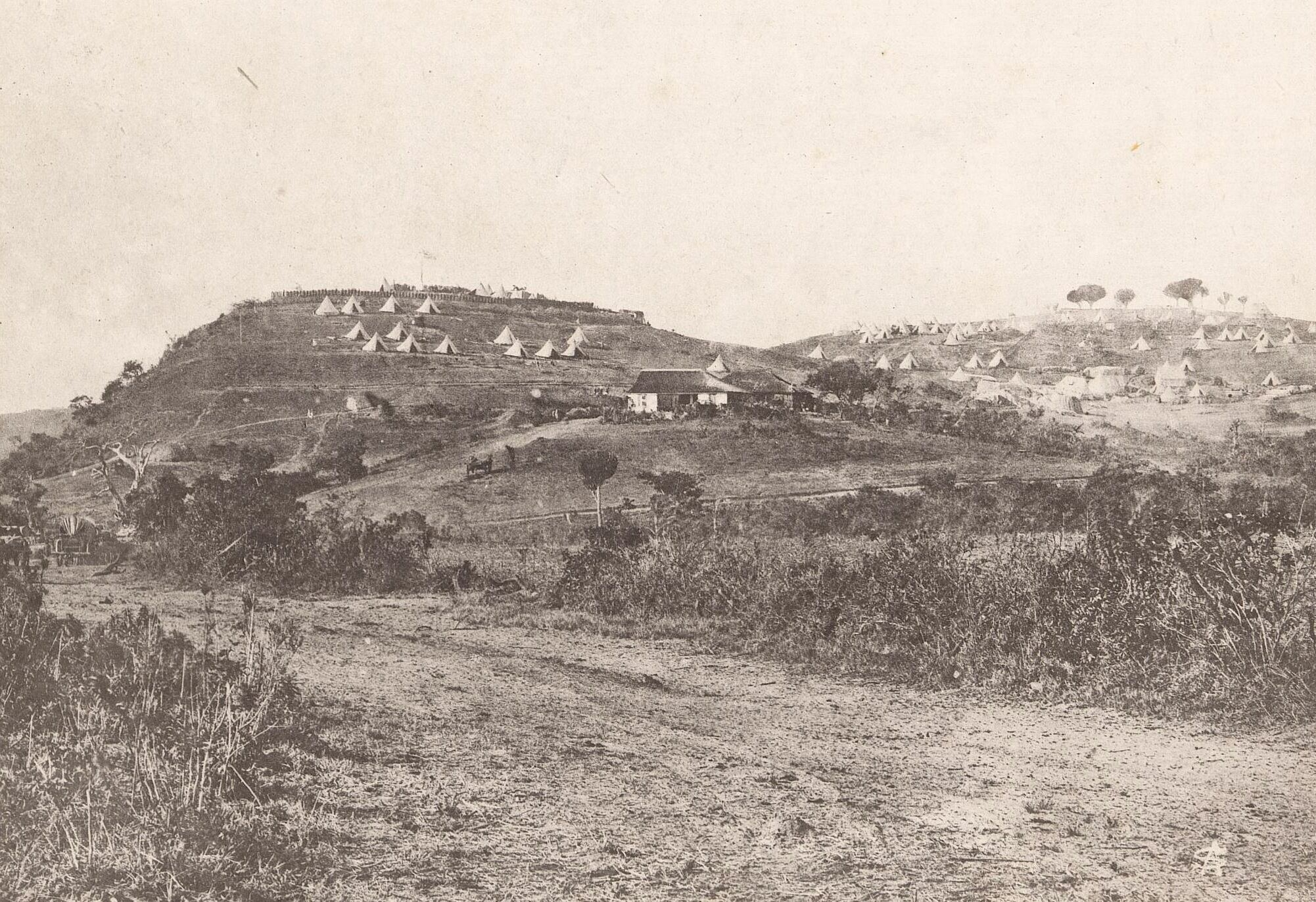
View of Fort Pearson, in or before 1880.

Fort Pearson was a fortification constructed by the British on the Natal side of the border with Zululand in the lead up to the 1879 Anglo-Zulu War. An earthen redoubt on a 300-foot (100 m) high cliff overlooking the Tugela River, the fort and its two external redoubts commanded an important river crossing. The crossing was used by one of the columns of the first invasion of January 1879, that was then besieged at Eshowe in Zululand. The crossing was used again by the Eshowe relief column in March and the second invasion in April. The fort was strengthened in April 1879 and connected to Pietermaritzburg by telegraph by June. The war was won by the British in July but the fort was briefly occupied again by British troops in 1883 during the Third Zulu Civil War.

== Pre-war ==
A contemporary depiction of the fort showing the river cliffs

Fort Pearson was an earthen redoubt constructed by the 2nd battalion of the 3rd Regiment of Foot (the Buffs) and part of the Naval Brigade (Royal Navy personnel serving as infantry) on the Natal side of the Tugela River in November 1878. These units afterwards helped to garrison the fort. The fort was sited on a 300-foot (100 m) high bluff, overlooking a drift (shallow crossing) of the Tugela. The location was so commanding that it was considered by the British to be impregnable to Zulu attack.

A short distance downstream of the fort the British installed a pont ferry crossing to support the advance. Aside from the main fort there were also two smaller redoubts (including Euphorbia Hill Redoubt) to help control the river crossing. It was named for Colonel Charles Knight Pearson.

The crossing under the fort was the location for the 11 December 1878 meeting between Colony of Natal official John Shepstone and a delegation of Zulu indunas at which Shepstone presented an ultimatum to the Zulu. The ultimatum was harsh, demanding radical change in the Zulu way of life, and it was intended by the British that the Zulu king Cetshwayo would reject it and that this would serve as a casus belli for the Anglo-Zulu War. War was declared in January 1879 and British commander Lord Chelmsford commenced a three-pronged invasion of Zululand.

== Anglo-Zulu War ==
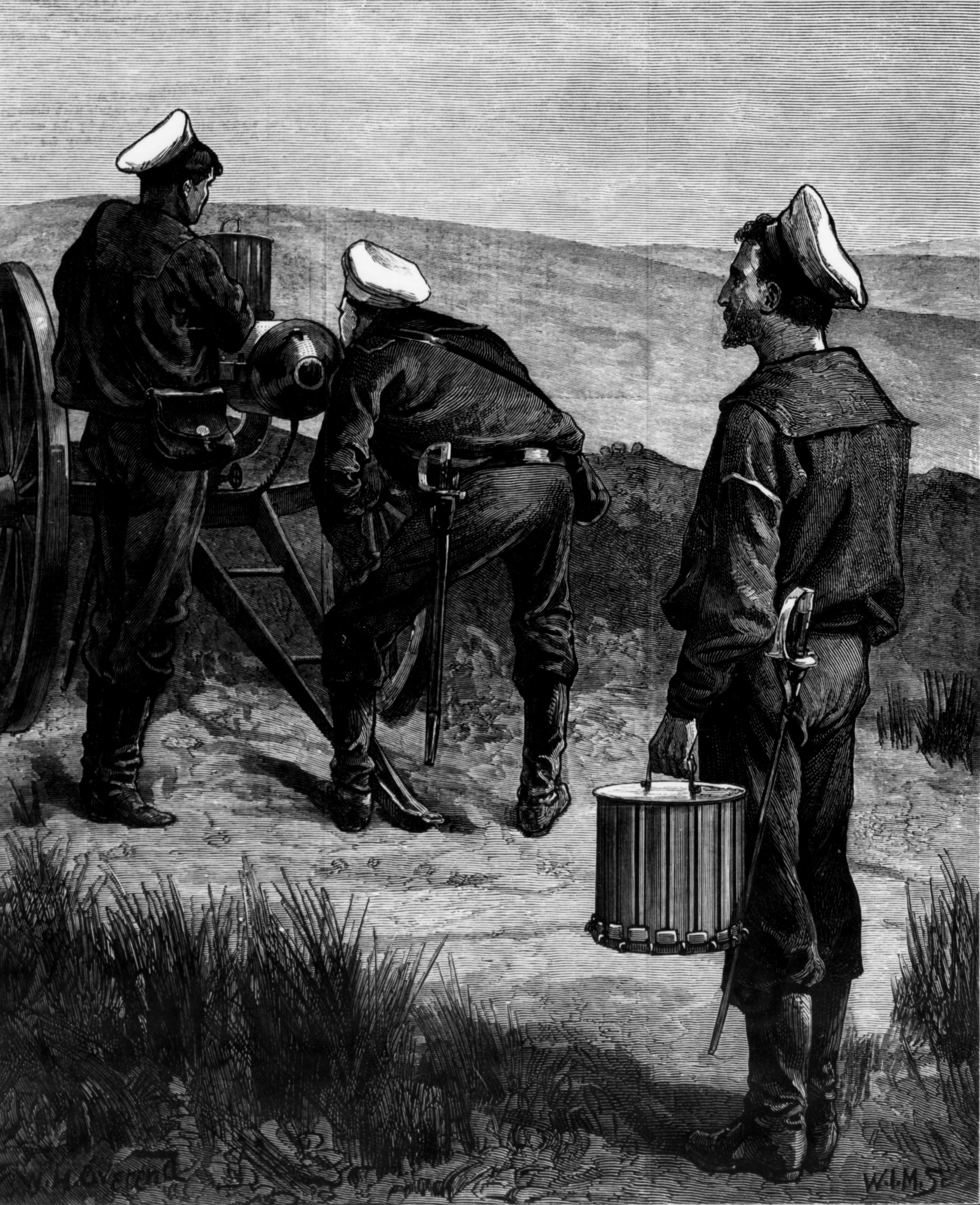
Garrison of Fort Pearson at Gatling gun practice, from a photograph

The fort served as a supply depot and base of operations for the Right (No. 1) Column during the first invasion of Zululand, during which, in January, Fort Tenedos was constructed on the Zulu side of the river. The Naval Brigade left their two 12-pounder field guns at the fort when they joined the column's advance to Eshowe. The first crossing of the Tugela by the column, using the ponts and marshalled by the Royal Navy sailors, was spectacular and drew a crowd of civilian onlookers from Durban.

During the advance the fort was garrisoned by two companies of the 99th Regiment of Foot and a part of the Natal Native Contingent. On 13 March a private of the 99th Regiment ran from the fort's hospital and killed himself by throwing himself off the cliff and into the Tugela.

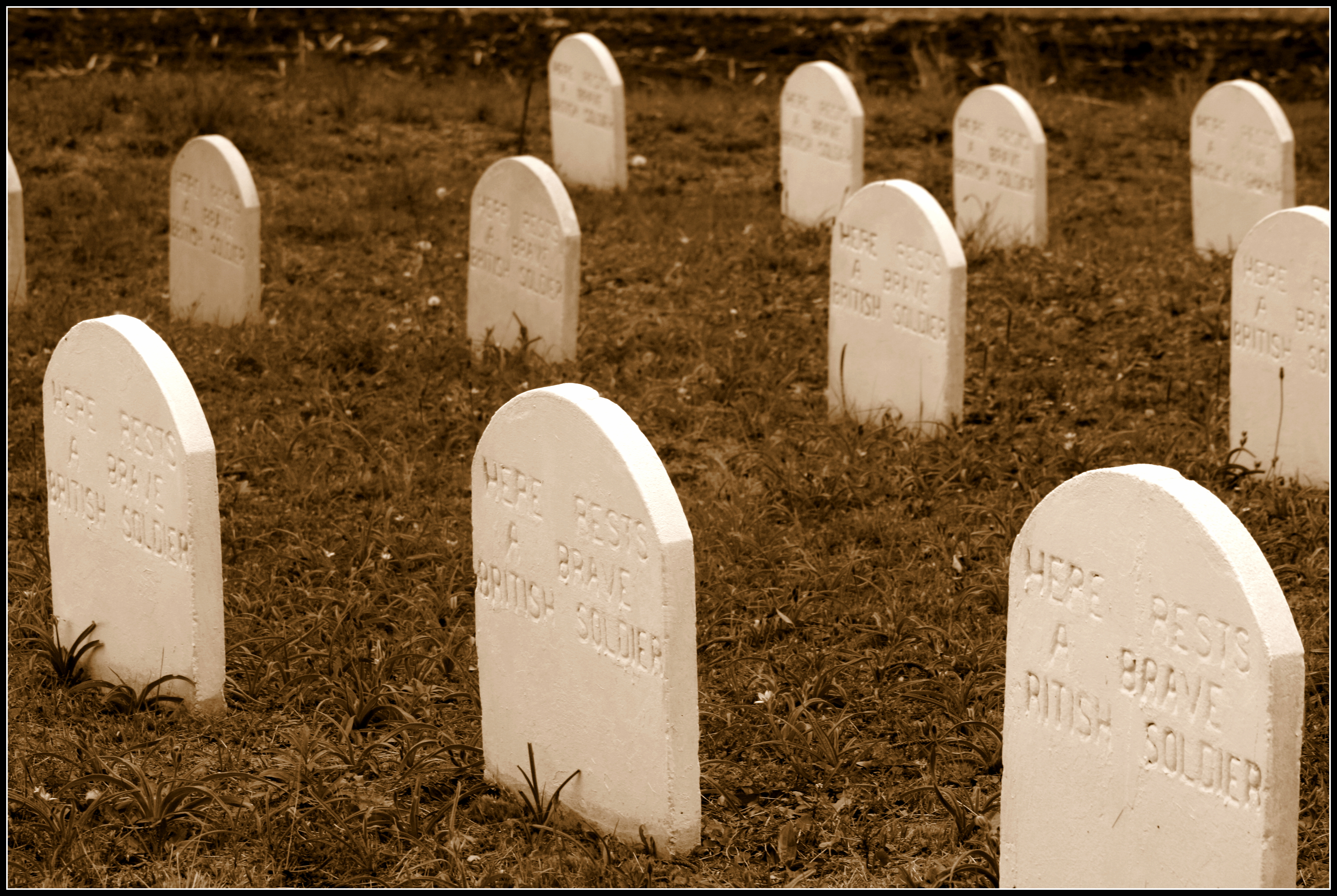
Graves in the Anglo-Zulu War–era cemetery

The fort supported the Eshowe relief column (relieving the Siege of Eshowe) of March–April 1879 and the 1st Division, South African Field Force, in the second invasion (April–July 1879). Following the relief of Eshowe and in advance of the second invasion of Zululand, in April 1879 the fort was strengthened by men of Major-General Henry Hope Crealock's 1st Division. In May the pont ferry was replaced by a pontoon bridge and in June the main channel was crossed by a semi-permanent trestle bridge. By this time a telegraph connection linked Fort Pearson with Durban and onwards to Pietermaritzburg. During the rest of the campaign the fort served as a hospital for the sick and wounded. Initially equipped with 200 beds these soon proved insufficient due to large numbers of men falling sick and, despite regular convoys of sick being taken to the base hospital at Durban, sometimes accommodated 400 men.

On 5 July General Garnet Wolseley, who had been sent to replace Chelmsford, reached the fort. On arrival Wolseley received news that Chelmsford had defeated the Zulu in the Battle of Ulundi and effectively won the war.

== Later use ==
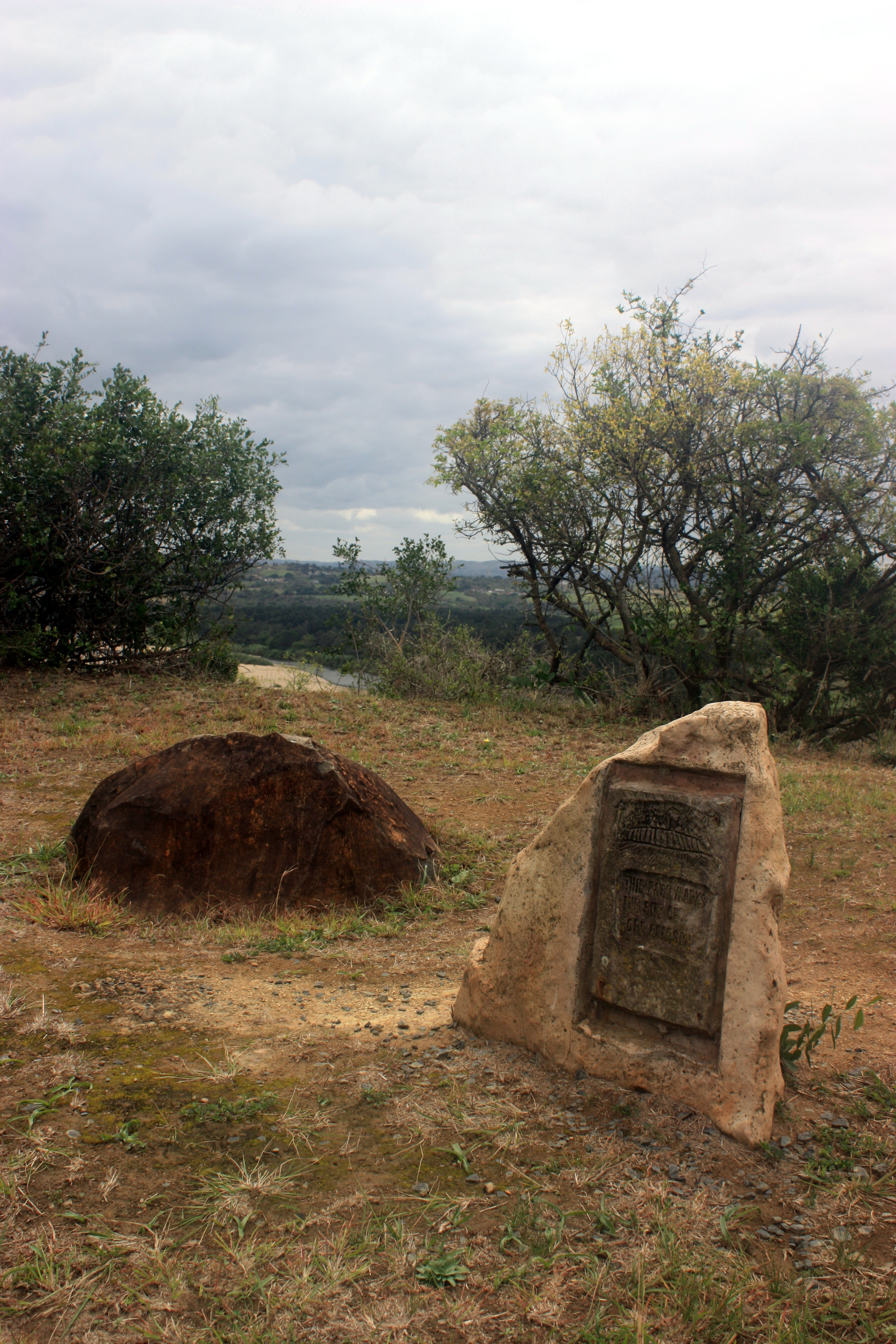
The rock marking the site of the fort, photographed in 2013

The fort was used again in the Third Zulu Civil War in 1883. In late September a British force assembled there ahead of an advance to Eshowe to protect the British commissioner there.

The site was later abandoned. It was granted protection by the South African government as a provincial heritage site on 25 August 1950.

Access is possible by arrangement with Ezemvelo KZN Wildlife who operate the Harold Johnson Nature Reserve.

== Sources ==
- David, Saul (2004). Zulu: The Heroism and Tragedy of the Zulu War of 1879. London: Viking. ISBN 0-670-91474-6.
- Greaves, Adrian (2005). Crossing the Buffalo: The Zulu War of 1879. London: Cassell. ISBN 978-0-3043-6725-2.
- Knight, Ian (2000). The Anglo-Zulu War, 1879. Archival Publications International. ISBN 978-1-903008-00-3.
- Knight, Ian (2004). The National Army Museum Book of the Zulu War. Pan Books. ISBN 033-0-48629-2.
- Knight, Ian (16 October 2008). Companion to the Anglo-Zulu War. Pen and Sword. ISBN 978-1-84415-801-0.
- Laband, John (2009). Historical Dictionary of the Zulu Wars. Scarecrow Press. ISBN 978-0-8108-6300-2.
- Morris, Donald R. (1965). The Washing of the Spears. Pen and Sword. ISBN 067-1-63108-X.
- Paulin, Christopher M. (2001). White Men's Dreams, Black Men's Blood: African Labor and British Expansionism in Southern Africa, 1877–1895. Africa World Press. ISBN 978-0-86543-929-0.
- "Fort Pearson, Tugela River, Natal, 1879". National Army Museum. Online Collection. Retrieved 29 November 2022.
- The Illustrated London News. No. 2073.—Vol. LXXIV. 8 March 1879. p. 219.
