= Barbara Tuck =

New Zealand artist (born 1943)

Barbara Tuck (born 1943) is a New Zealand artist. Her works are held in the collections of the Auckland Art Gallery and the Te Papa.

== Early life ==
Barbara Tuck was born in 1943 in Hamilton.

== Education ==
Barbara Tuck graduated from Elam School of Fine Arts in the mid-1960s.

After completing her degree, Tuck put her practice on hold to have children in the late 1960s.

== Career ==
Tuck has exhibited widely within New Zealand, including:

- Double Doors: an Artist in Focus exhibition at Auckland Art Gallery Toi o Tāmaki in August 1983, in collaboration with Gillian Chaplin. By chance, the two artists discovered they were both making small boxes as a framework for sculptural assemblages. Previously Chaplin had concentrated on photography and Tuck on painting, but in this departure from their usual fields of work they found common ground and began work on a shared installation. About twenty small boxes were treated by each artist, and for the installation they were alternated on a long narrow table. Chairs placed around the outside encouraged people to take their time in contemplating the works. The works referenced the Surrealists, in particular the boxes of Joseph Cornell, but with a more feminine viewpoint.
- Surface Tension: Ten Artists in the '90s exhibition at Auckland Art Gallery Toi o Tāmaki in 1992, curated by Tina Barton.
- Necessary Distraction featuring 100 works by 20 artists at the Auckland Art Gallery Toi o Tāmaki from November 2015 - March 2016, curated by Natasha Conland.
- In the Vast Emptiness at Christchurch Art Gallery in 2016.
