= Harold Johnson Nature Reserve =

Natural reserve

- Location within South Africa
- Coordinates: 29°12′40″S 31°25′26″E
- Area: 100 hectares (250 acres)

The Harold Johnson Nature Reserve is a small nature reserve (100 hectares (250 acres)) on the KwaZulu-Natal north coast. The reserve is administered by Ezemvelo KZN Wildlife and is on the southern bank of the Tugela River and 6 kilometres (3.7 mi) from the river's mouth.

Wildlife species include zebra, bushbuck, impala, blue, red duiker and grey duiker, vervet monkey, slender mongoose, white-tailed mongoose, banded mongoose and porcupine. Over 190 bird species have been observed in the reserve. One hundred and fourteen butterflies species have been recorded.

Two national monuments are located within the boundaries: Fort Pearson and the Ultimatum Tree. In 1879 the British presented an ultimatum to the Zulu nation at the Ultimatum Tree on the banks of the Tugela River; this ultimatum precipitated the Anglo Zulu War.

== See also ==
- List of heritage sites in KwaZulu–Natal

== Notes and references ==
- Remedies and Rituals Trail: Harold Johnson Nature Reserve. Natal Parks Board. 1985.
- Olivier, Willie; Olivier, Sandra (2003). Hiking Trails of South Africa. Struik. ISBN 978-1-86872-787-2.
