= Fort Tenedos =

Coordinates: 29.2074°S 31.4348°E

- Part of Anglo-Zulu War defences
- Left (Zulu) bank of the Tugela River, KwaZulu-Natal, South Africa

Site information
- Type: Earthwork fort
- Controlled by: British Empire
- Open to the public: No
- Condition: Earthworks remain (partially)

Site history
- Built: January 1879
- Built by: Royal Engineers (2nd Field Company)
- In use: 1879
- Materials: Earth
- Battles/wars: Anglo-Zulu War

Garrison information
- Garrison: 91st Highlanders, Naval Brigade (HMS Tenedos), Natal Native Contingent, Natal Hussars, Mounted Rifles units
- Armament: 2 Royal Artillery guns, 2 × 7-pounders (Naval Brigade), 1 Gatling gun

Fort Tenedos was a large earth-walled fort constructed on the Zulu side of the Tugela River in January 1879, opposite Fort Pearson, to support the British at the start of the Anglo-Zulu War.

== Construction ==
On 2 December 1878 Captain W. R. C. Wynne embarked in command of the 2nd Field Company of the Royal Engineers for Natal, part of the small number of reinforcements sent to the colony ahead of the Anglo-Zulu War of 1879. The company joined the first column under Colonel Charles Knight Pearson at the mouth of the Tugela River on 12 January and the following day crossed the river with them. In the presence of the Zulu, Wynne with his company of Royal Engineers, assisted by the line, laid out and built Fort Tenedos on the left (Zulu) bank of the Lower Tugela. The earthwork fort, large enough to shelter the entire column and a quantity of stores, was completed between 13 and 17 January. It was named Fort Tenedos after the British warship HMS Tenedos, anchored off the mouth of the Tugela. Her crew formed part of the Naval Brigade.

== Defences ==
The fort's armament consisted of two guns from the Royal Artillery, two 7-pounder guns with the Naval Brigade, and a Gatling gun. Local British units consisted of the 91st Highlanders, Natal Hussars, the Durban Mounted Rifles, Alexandra Mounted Rifles, Stanger Mounted Rifles, and the Victorian Mounted Rifles. There were also some 2,200 Natal Natives formed into two battalions of the 2nd Regiment, Natal Native Contingent, and a company of Durnford's Natal Native Pioneer Corps. These men were recruited from local African tribes hostile to the Zulus.

== Sources ==
- Laband, John (2009). Historical Dictionary of the Zulu Wars. The Scarecrow Press, Inc. ISBN 978-0-8108-6078-0, 978-0-8108-6300-2.
- Morris, Donald R. (1965). The Washing of the Spears. Pen and Sword. ISBN 067-1-63108-X.
- The Illustrated London News. No. 2073.—Vol. LXXIV. 8 March 1879. p. 219.

Attribution:

- This article incorporates text from a publication now in the public domain: Vetch, Robert Hamilton (1900). "Wynne, Warren Richard Colvin". In Lee, Sidney (ed.). Dictionary of National Biography. Vol. 63. London: Smith, Elder & Co. p. 264.
