= Siege of Eshowe =

Siege during the Anglo-Zulu War

- Part of the Anglo-Zulu War
- Wagons crossing Amatikulu drift on the way to Eshowe
Date	22 January – 3 April 1879
Location	Eshowe 28.892767°S 31.497075°E
Result	British victory

Belligerents
British Empire	Zulu Kingdom

Commanders and leaders
Charles Pearson	Dabulamanzi kaMpande

Strength
1,694 (No. 1 Column garrisoned at Eshowe); 5,670 (Relief Column)	12,000

Casualties and losses
137 killed	c. 1,000 killed
- Location in present-day South Africa Siege of Eshowe (KwaZulu-Natal)

The siege of Eshowe took place during the Anglo-Zulu War of 1879. The siege was part of a three-pronged attack on the Zulu Impis of king Cetshwayo at Ulundi. After an incursion as far as Eshowe (then also known as Fort Ekowe or kwaMondi) Colonel Charles Pearson was besieged there for two months by the Zulus.

== Prelude ==
=== No. 1 Column ===
No. 1 Column of the British invasion force, under Colonel Charles Pearson, had been ordered to establish an advanced base at Eshowe. He was to move his forces there rapidly in order to prevent the buildings from being burnt. After occupying Eshowe, Pearson was to entrench it and establish a supply base. He was to confine his operations to between Eshowe and the Tugela River until word of the other two invading columns' progress reached him. The force crossed the Tugela from Natal into Zululand on 12 January 1879. The advance was unopposed until 22 January, when a Zulu force attempted to bar their way. The British were camped about 4 mi (6.4 km) south of the Inyezane River, which they had crossed the previous day, beneath a steep ridge with three spurs leading down towards the river and surrounded by scrub. A prominent knoll sat about halfway and there was a small kraal near the left of the crest.

=== Inyezane ===
Shortly after 08:00 a small number of Zulus appeared near the knoll on the ridge and a company of the Natal Native Contingent (NNC), under Lieutenant Hart, were sent up the spur after them. While this company gave chase a mass of Zulus appeared over the crest of the ridge and began pouring downwards. These men were the left "horn" of a 6,000 strong force, dispatched at the same time as the army that engaged the British at Isandlwana, who were preparing just over the crest, to attack the British camp. This left horn had been prompted into a premature attack by the advance of Lieutenant Hart's company and in the face of this advance the NNC fled, leaving their European officers and NCOs to make a fruitless stand before being swept aside. As soon as Hart and his men began firing, the camp prepared for defence, forming a hasty firing line. A naval company and two companies of Buffs with a Gatling gun and several 7-pounders moved up to the knoll, opening up across the advancing Zulu column. When the Zulus emerged from scrub and began their assault on the camp, they were subjected to massed fire from the flank and front; the Zulus wavered and then withdrew the way they had come.

While the left horn was being repulsed, the rest of the Zulu impi appeared over the crest. The kraal was taken and switching their guns to focus on it, the British force that had attacked the flank of the left horn advanced up the slope and captured the kraal. This position allowed the British to move the Gatling gun onto the crest where its rapid fire soon drove the Zulus off the centre and left end of the ridge, as the British mounted troops came up the right-hand spur to complete the action. The counter-attack resulted in 10 British killed and 16 wounded. The Zulu impi withdrew with 350 killed.

== Eshowe ==
Pearson continued his march unhindered and the following day reached the mission near Eshowe at 28.892767°S 31.497075°E, 2,000 ft (610 m) above sea level. Eshowe consisted of a deserted church, school and the house of a Norwegian missionary. Low hills surrounded it about a quarter of a mile away to the north, east and west but to the south the Indian Ocean could be seen. Pearson sent a group of empty wagons with escorts to collect fresh supplies from the Lower Drift, while the rest of his force began to dig in. The next day, 24 January, bore a disturbing message for Pearson that Colonel Anthony Durnford's No. 2 Column had been wiped out in the Middle Drift, leaving the Lower Drift behind Eshowe in grave danger. If the Zulus took the Lower Drift, Eshowe would be cut off and there would be nothing between the Zulu Army and Natal.

Two days later, Lord Chelmsford contacted Pearson. Without giving any details of the disaster at the Battle of Isandlwana, he informed him that all orders were cancelled and that he was to take such as action as he thought fit to preserve his column, including withdrawal from Eshowe if necessary. If he withdrew, he was to hold the bridgehead at the Lower Drift, but he might be attacked by the whole Zulu Army. Pearson had no precise information on the whereabouts of the Zulu and although his defences around the mission would soon be complete, it was not an ideal position to defend. His force had plenty of ammunition but other supplies were insufficient and the consensus of his subordinates was to pull back to the Lower Drift. The decision to stay was settled on when news arrived of the return of the supply wagons, with five further companies as reinforcement from the Lower Drift.

== Siege ==
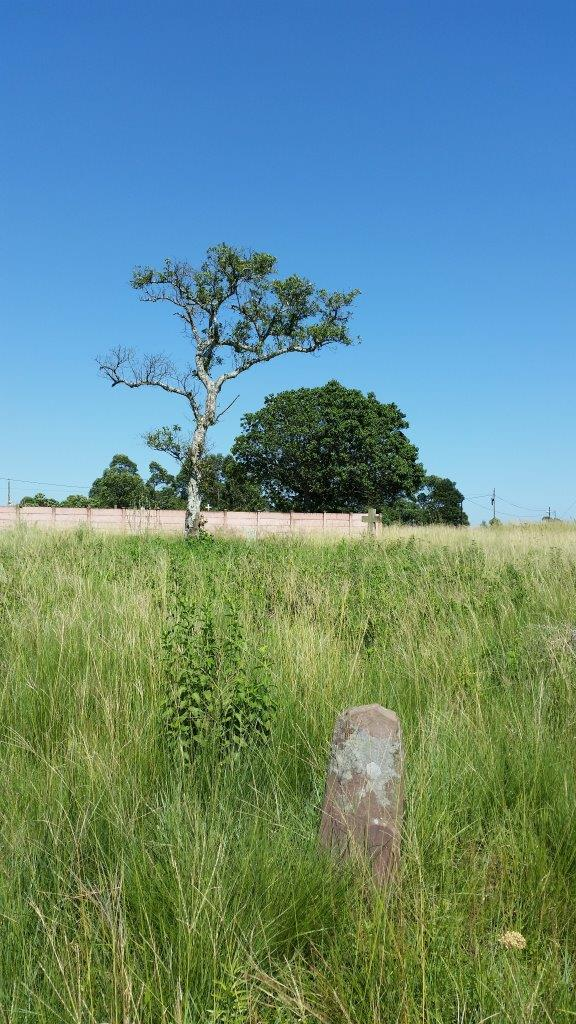
Remains of foundations from the siege fort in Eshowe

The fort enclosing the abandoned Norwegian Lutheran mission was roughly rectangular, 200 yd × 50 yd (183 m × 46 m), with loop-holed walls 6 ft (1.8 m) high. It was surrounded by a broad ditch in which sharpened sticks were embedded, forming an abattis. Work parties cleared and cut back vegetation all round out to 800 yd (730 m) to improve the field of fire. A second line of defence, should the outer ramparts fall, was formed by placing the wagons in a laager inside the walls. A kraal to house the horses and cattle was also constructed. Pearson's strength, at the start of the siege, stood at 1,292 Europeaan and 65 African troops, with 47 European and 290 African support staff.

The appearance of large Zulu contingents on the surrounding hills on 2 February, that were forced back by artillery-fire from the 7-pounders, compelled Pearson to request reinforcements. A week later, he learned for the first time the full extent of the centre column's defeat at Isandlwana and was told that there could be no reinforcement. Pearson considered withdrawing part of his garrison, if Chelmsford agreed but receiving no response and no further runners, it became clear that Eshowe had been cut off. The garrison would run out of provisions by the beginning of April.

February passed with no Zulu attack, save for sniping and skirmishing by patrols. The beginning of March led Pearson to attack a kraal 7 mi (11 km) away, to keep his soldiers from idling. The next day a heliograph was spotted signalling from Fort Tenedos 22 mi (35 km) away. To reply, a makeshift apparatus was constructed at Eshowe. With the establishment of communications, they learned a relief force would depart the Lower Drift on 13 March and advance to the site of the Battle of Inyezane, where the garrison would meet it. This was cheering news for the besieged troops because rations were running low and sickness had killed 20 men. As the garrison prepared to meet their relief on 13 March, another message said the arrival of the relief column was delayed until 1 April.

== Relief ==
Men of the 57th Regiment entrenching a laager.

On 1 April Lord Chelmsford led the relief column towards Eshowe. The force consisted of 3,390 European soldiers, 2,280 Natal Native Contingent, 120 wagons and artillery; two 9-pounder guns, four 24-pounder Congreve rockets tubes and two Gatling guns. Progress was slow because the roundabout route to avoid Zulu ambushes, crossed rivers were swollen by heavy rains. By the evening of 1 April, Pearson's observers at Eshowe could see the relief column laagering 10 mi (16 km) away.

The British camp was sited atop a 300 ft (91 m) east−west ridge that had sloping ground on all sides providing the defenders with a good field of fire. Further to the west the ground dipped before rising again up to the 470 ft (140 m) Umisi Hill. After the Battle of Isandlwana, the British were taking no chances bivouacing in Zulu territory. A waist-high square earthwork was constructed around the encampment using the spoil dug from a 4 ft (1.2 m) deep trench. Each side was roughly 130 yd (120 m) long. While the defences were being built, mounted scouts reported seeing small parties of Zulus beyond Umisi Hill.

That evening Chelmsford decided the column would not continue to Eshowe in the morning. At dawn the next day, a 12,000-strong Zulu impi (which contained veterans of Isandlwana drawn from other regiments in the main Zulu army) attacked the British camp in the Battle of Gingindlovu. Despite numerous attacks throughout the day by the Zulus, to emulate the overwhelming victory they had achieved at Isandlwana two months ago, the firepower from the camp's entrenched defenders kept them at bay. The Zulus eventually retreated as night fell.

On 3 April, the relief column entered Eshowe, led by pipers of the 91st Highlanders. The two-month siege had been lifted. Chelmsford concluded that Eshowe did not need to be retained and the laboriously constructed defences were demolished. Bivouacking on the first night after their departure from it on 6 April, Pearson's men could see that the Zulus had set the Eshowe encampment ablaze.

== See also ==
- Military history of South Africa

== Bibliography ==
- Castle, Ian; Knight, Ian (1994). Fearful Hard Times: The Siege and Relief of Eshowe. Greenhill Books. ISBN 1-85367-180-0.
- Greaves, A (2012). Forgotten Battles of the Zulu War. Barnsley: Pen & Sword Military. ISBN 978-1-84468-135-8.
- Laband, John (2009). Historical dictionary of the Zulu Wars. Scarecrow Press. ISBN 978-0-8108-6078-0.
- Thompson, Paul Singer (2006). Black Soldiers of the Queen: The Natal Native Contingent in the Anglo-Zulu War. University of Alabama Press. ISBN 0-8173-5368-2.
