= HMS Boadicea (1875) =

British Royal Navy ship

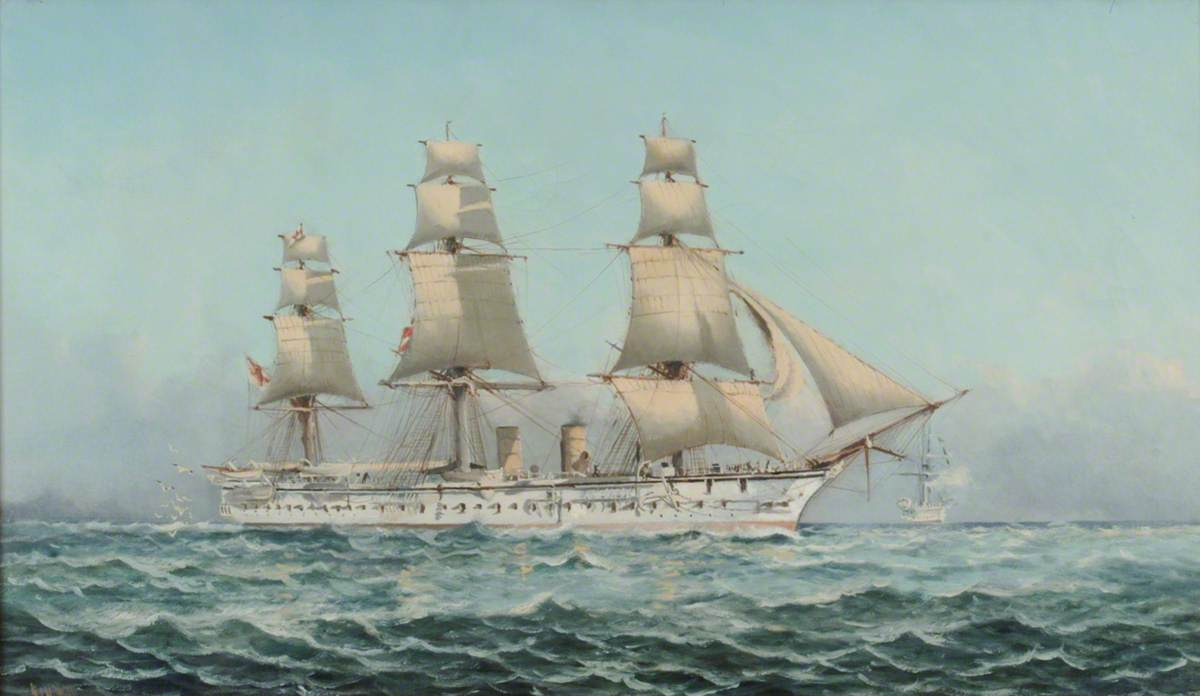
- HMS Boadicea by Henry J. Morgan

History

United Kingdom
- Name: HMS Boadicea
- Namesake: Boadicea
- Builder: Portsmouth Naval Dockyard
- Launched: 16 October 1875
- Completed: 1878
- Fate: Sold, Thos. W. Ward, 1897

General characteristics
- Class & type: Bacchante-class corvette
- Displacement: 4,070 long tons (4,135 t)
- Length: 280 ft (85 m)
- Beam: 45.5 ft (13.9 m)
- Draught: 23.75 ft (7.2 m)
- Installed power: 5,420 hp (4,042 kW)
- Propulsion: 1 shaft, 1 Horizontal return connecting rod-steam engine; Coal-fired Normand boilers
- Sail plan: Ship rigged
- Speed: 15 knots (28 km/h; 17 mph)
- Complement: 375, later increased to 420
- Armament: 14 × 7-inch rifled muzzle-loading guns; 2 × Whitehead torpedo carriages

HMS Boadicea was a Bacchante-class corvette launched in 1875. She served in the Zulu War between March–June 1879, and landed some of her men to join the naval brigade serving ashore; these took part in the Battle of Gingindlovu and the Relief of Eshowe.

In 1881, she landed some of her crew to take part in the First Boer War [Naval Brigade].

Robert Falcon Scott served on her early in his career.

She was struck off the effective list at Portsmouth and classified as a hulk in March 1900.

== Publications ==
- Colledge, J. J.; Warlow, Ben (2006) [1969]. Ships of the Royal Navy: The Complete Record of All Fighting Ships of the Royal Navy from the 15th Century to the Present (3rd Rev ed.). London: Chatham Publishing. ISBN 978-1-86176-281-8. OCLC 67375475.
