= Natal, South Africa =

Natal, South Africa can refer to:

- Natalia Republic, a Boer republic (1839–1843)
- Colony of Natal, a British colony (1843–1910)
- Natal (province), a province of South Africa (1910–1994)
- KwaZulu-Natal, a province of South Africa (1994–present)
- Natal (region), a geographical area within South Africa

== See also ==
- Zulu Kingdom, an African monarchy co-existent with, and later part of, the Colony of Natal (1816–1897)
- KwaZulu, a bantustan in South Africa (1981–1994)
