= Charles Pearson (British Army officer) =

Lieutenant-General Sir Charles Pearson KCMG CB
- Born: July 1834; Somerset, England
- Died: 2 October 1909 (aged 75); Surrey, England
- Military career
- Allegiance: United Kingdom
- Branch: British Army
- Service years: 1852–1895
- Rank: Lieutenant-General
- Units: 31st Regiment of Foot; 3rd Regiment of Foot
- Conflicts: Crimean War: Siege of Sevastopol; Anglo-Zulu War: Siege of Eshowe
- Awards: Knight Commander of the Order of St Michael and St George; Companion of the Order of the Bath; Mentioned in Despatches (11 times)

Lieutenant-General Sir Charles Knight Pearson KCMG CB (July 1834 – 2 October 1909) was a military commander in the British Army during the Anglo-Zulu War (also known as the Zulu War). Pearson was born in Somerset to Commander Charles Pearson of the Royal Navy. After buying the rank of Ensign in the 99th Regiment of Foot in 1852, Pearson served during the Crimean War where he was Mentioned in Despatches. After steadily rising through the ranks, Pearson was sent to South Africa to command a battalion of the 3rd Regiment of Foot (the Buffs). After retiring for a short period, he rejoined the Army after the outbreak of the Zulu War. Pearson was placed in command of a column of infantry which then became besieged at Eshowe for 70 days until Lord Chelmsford relieved them. After the war, Pearson became Governor and Commandant of the Royal Victoria Hospital, Netley, then commander of forces in the West Indies, before retiring in 1885. Pearson died in 1909.

== Early life and military career ==
Pearson was born in July 1834 in Thorne Coffin, Brympton, near Yeovil, Somerset to Commander Charles Pearson of the Royal Navy, who had served in the Peninsular War. He was educated at King's School, Bruton from 1847 until 1851.

Little is known of Pearson's early military career. Pearson bought the rank of Ensign in the 99th Regiment of Foot on 23 November 1852. He moved to the 31st Regiment of Foot on 18 February 1853. He was promoted to lieutenant (without purchase) on 15 June 1855, and served as adjutant of the 31st Regiment from 20 July 1855 during the Crimean War. He was present throughout the Siege of Sevastopol, including the "attack on the Redan", for which he was Mentioned in Despatches, he also received the Crimean medal with clasp and the Turkish Crimean War medal. He was promoted to captain (by purchase) on 15 February 1856. After a period on half pay, he returned to active duty on 7 August 1857, transferring to 3rd Regiment of Foot (the Buffs), and purchased his promotion to major on 2 May 1865.

He married Marian Catherine Mundy daughter of Lieut. Col. Sir Robert Miller Mundy in 1866. Pearson purchased his promotion to lieutenant-colonel and command of 2nd battalion, the Buffs on 14 August 1867, and received a brevet promotion to colonel on 14 August 1872. The Buffs were posted to South Africa, and in addition to command of the battalion he served as commandant in Natal from November 1876 to December 1877, and then served as a staff colonel in Natal and Cis-Vaal until September 1878 He retired, and went on half pay on 30 November 1878. However, with the outbreak of the Zulu war, he was placed in command of No 1 Column of the four columns Lord Chelmsford organised to begin the invasion of Zululand.

== Zulu war ==
While the British suffered a heavy defeat at the Battle of Isandlwana, to the south-east at Battle of Inyezane, No. 1 Column had repelled a Zulu advance, this engagement apparently included the first use of a Gatling gun by British forces. No. 1 Column was made up of approximately 4,750 regular and Natal Native Contingent soldiers led by Pearson. The first division of No. 1 Column, approximately 2,758 men, repelled a 6,000 strong Zulu attempt to stop the British advance to Ulundi. Pearson had suffered minimal losses for 400 Zulu and he advanced 4 miles further towards their objective; Eshowe. Eshowe was originally planned to be a forward depot for a final advance towards Ulundi. This was thrown into doubt after the defeat at Isandlwana. Pearson received instructions from Lord Chelmsford stating "consider all my instructions cancelled and act in whatever manner you think most desirable in the interests of the column under your command." Pearson decided to dig-in and he ordered his column of approximately 1,694 men to build heavy fortifications around the garrison in preparation for a siege; the Siege of Eshowe had started. The siege lasted for 71 days until Chelmsford broke through to relieve them. For his actions throughout South Africa he was Mentioned in Despatches a further 10 times, and appointed a Companion of the Order of the Bath (CB) whilst he was still fighting, On 6 October 1879 he received a hero's welcome in his home town of Yeovil, the church bells were rung, he was greeted by the Mayor, who compared him with previous West Country heroes such as Drake, Grenville, Raleigh and Hawkins, and presented with a specially inscribed sword. The war was already somewhat controversial, the actions by Sir Bartle Frere and Lord Chelmsford which began it had not been specifically authorised by the British Government in advance, and the disaster at Isandlwana led to the defence of Eshowe by Pearson, and the famous action at Rorke's Drift being used to distract from the failure there. At this reception, Pearson defended the conduct of the war, and was supported by Sir Percy Douglas, who had preceded Chelmsford as the commander of British forces in South Africa. He was invested with the insignia of a Companion of the Bath by Queen Victoria at Windsor Castle on 8 December, and those of a Knight Commander of the Order of St Michael and St George (KCMG) on 11 December 1879, although this award was not actually gazetted until 19 December.

== Later life ==
After the war, Pearson became Governor and Commandant of the Royal Victoria Hospital, Netley on 5 May 1880. Pearson was promoted from Colonel to Major-General on 1 April 1883. On 1 April 1885, Pearson was promoted to the post of Major-General on the Staff to command troops in the West Indies. He stayed in the post until March 1890. He was promoted to Lieutenant General on 28 January 1891 and he retired on 1 April 1895. On 22 December 1899, he travelled to Southampton as part of the send off for his old battalion, 2nd Buffs, who were departing for South Africa once again, this time to fight in the Boer War. Pearson died in Upper Norwood, Surrey (now South London) on 2 October 1909.
