= Natal Native Contingent =

British military unit

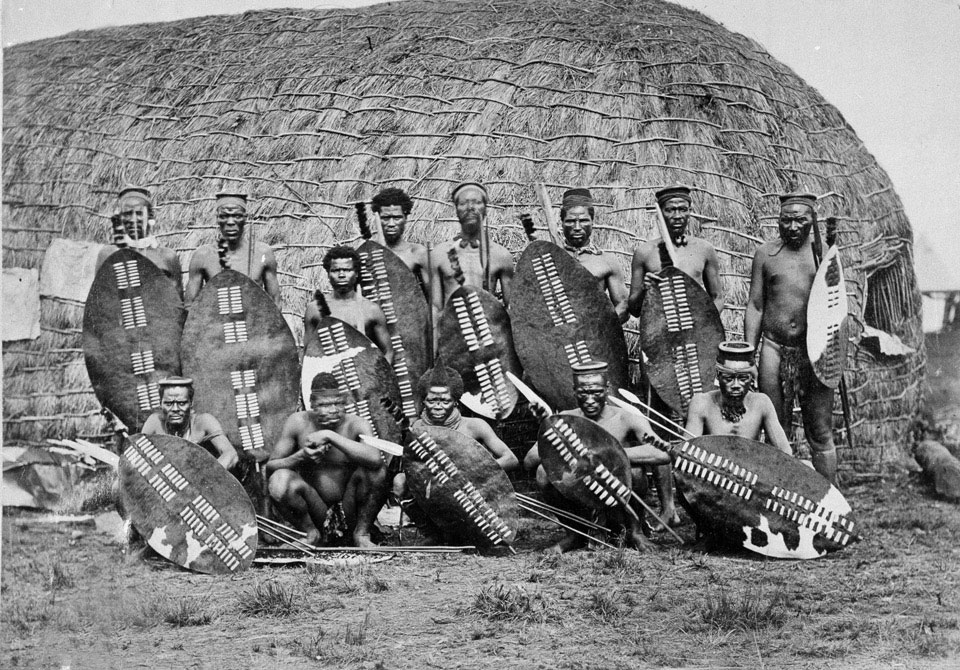
Members of the Natal Native Contingent (NNC) armed with assegais and shields, 1879

The Natal Native Contingent was a large force of auxiliary soldiers in British South Africa, forming a substantial portion of the defence forces of the British colony of Natal. The Contingent saw action during the 1879 Anglo-Zulu War. The Natal Mounted Police was created in 1873 to bolster the defenses of Natal. It enlisted European officers, NCOs and natives. The infantry was created in 1878. Most enlisted troops were drawn from the Basuto and Mpondo tribes, which had had long experience fighting the Zulus.

== Establishment and organisation ==
The Natal legislature established the Natal Mounted Police in 1873 and appointed Major J. G. Dartnell as commander. However, they were slow to appropriate funds for the organization. The first trooper enrolled in March 1874. The first headquarters were at Fort Napier in Pietermaritzburg.

The infantry was created in 1878 under Lieutenant Colonel Anthony William Durnford as part of the Zululand expeditionary force.

The structure of the NNC followed the pattern of regular British infantry units at the time. Each regiment consisted of two to three battalions, divided into ten companies of 100 black soldiers each, with six European NCOs and three European officers per company. Units received rudimentary training at best. Elements of standard British infantry training were not added until after the Zulu War.

== Equipment ==
Due to budget constraints, the British were unable to provide NNC troops with uniforms. Instead, soldiers wore traditional tribal apparel with a red cloth bandanna around their foreheads, the only item that distinguished them from Zulu warriors. NCO's and officers wore Khaki and black uniforms.

Primarily due to logistical and budget constraints, but also due to the European population's fear that arming the black population would create a severe security risk, initially fewer than one in ten NNC troopers were issued rifles; the rest made do with traditional assegais and cowhide shields. The officers and NCOs, about 90 men per battalion, carried rifles, ammunition and bayonets. In addition, soldiers who were issued a musket firearm were provided only four rounds of ammunition at any one time. The bulk of the NNC fought with traditional African spears and shields and only about 20% of the unit had some sort of gun. (Note: 10 captains, 20 lieutenants, 30 sergeants, 30 corporals and some 100 soldiers, or about 20% of the total each battalion had some sort of firearm.)

== Effectiveness ==
At the beginning of the Anglo-Zulu War in January 1879, the NNC's commander, Colonel Durnford, frequently voiced his opinion that the NNC troops should be used as scouts for the advancing British army, as their appearance (similar to Zulu warriors) would confuse Zulu scouts. The NNC was, in his view, particularly well-adapted to reconnaissance and light infantry roles, as NNC soldiers were generally in better physical condition than British regulars (some of whom were hampered by heatstroke and illness resulting from over-exposure to the sun in the South African summer) and were not encumbered with heavy equipment. Instead, the commander of the British forces, Lord Chelmsford, frequently assigned NNC troops to menial tasks, refusing to credit their fighting abilities.

Battlefield performance was uneven. At the Battle of Isandhlwana, NNC units fought alongside British counterparts and sustained heavy casualties. Many NNC were killed in hand-to-hand combat while trying to retreat across the Buffalo River. At the Battle of Rorke's Drift, the NNC officers, NCOs, and soldiers who possessed firearms were deployed along the barricade. The rest of the NNC, stripped of their command and armed only with spears, were posted outside the mealy bag and biscuit box barricade within the stone-walled cattle kraal. They broke and fled as soon as the Zulu force came into sight, some NCOs and Captain Stephenson joining them. Lieutenant Gert Adendorff and a Swiss corporal of the contingent, Christian Ferdinand Schiess, remained with the latter winning the Victoria Cross for his gallantry in the ensuing battle.

After Isandlwana and Rorke's Drift, British commanders in South Africa worried about the loyalty of their NNC detachments, and many were incorporated into the Natal Border Guard instead. The NNC last saw action at Hlobane, where several NNC troops and a small British force were ambushed and killed by Zulu troops. After the war, the NNC was disbanded and the troops returned to civilian life.

== Natal Native Horse ==
While the bulk of the NNC consisted of infantrymen, the Natal Native Horse added a cavalry force. Formed of six troops of approximately fifty men each, the NNH was largely recruited from the amaNgwane, a Natal tribe traditionally hostile to the Zulus, and other tribes, as well as black Christians from Edendale Mission. The NNH were much better-equipped than their infantry counterparts; they wore tan-colored European uniforms, rode horses with full equipment, and bore a rifled carbine in addition to traditional spears. Units of the NNH were led by European officers.

Five troops of the NNH were present at Isandlwana. Three formed the Zikhali Horse squadron, named after their chief. The troopers fought well against the Zulus and were dismissed late in the battle by Colonel Durnford who was eager to save as many of his men as possible from the chaotic battle. The mounted NNH soldiers escaped quickly from the battlefield, and many black NNH troopers are credited with stopping to give rides to native and British soldiers struggling to escape the battlefield on foot. Most notably, Horace Smith-Dorrien was rescued and ridden to safety by an NNH trooper. Around 200 NNH troopers survived Isandlwana, but unlike the NNC infantry, were recommitted to the war; the remainder of the NNH saw action at the Battle of Kambula and at the Battle of Ulundi. After the war, the NNH was retained as a police force in conquered Zululand and saw action during the Zulu civil wars which began in the early 1880s. The NNH was finally disbanded during the 1899–1902 Second Anglo-Boer War, under a government initiative to disarm all-black units in South Africa out of fear that they could side with the Boers.

== Bibliography ==
- Thompson, Paul Singer (2006). Black soldiers of the queen: the Natal native contingent in the Anglo-Zulu War (Rev. ed.). Tuscaloosa, Ala: Univ. of Alabama Press. ISBN 978-0-8173-5368-1.
- Morris, Donald R. (1988). The Washing of the Spears: The Rise and Fall of the Zulu Nation Under Shaka and its Fall in the Zulu War of 1879. Cardinal. ISBN 9780747401940.
- Laband, John (2009). Historical dictionary of the Zulu wars. Historical dictionaries of war, revolution, and civil unrest. Lanham, Md: Scarecrow Press. ISBN 978-0-8108-6078-0. OCLC 276930370.
- "Isandlwana". The 100 Worst Military Disasters in History: 202–206. 2020. doi:10.5040/9798400605413.ch-056. ISBN 979-8-4006-0541-3.
- Lock, Ron (2017). The Anglo-Zulu War-Isandlwana: the revelation of a disaster. Barnsley, South Yorkshire: Pen & Sword Military. ISBN 978-1-5267-0742-0. OCLC 991077017.
- Knight, Ian (2003). The Zulu War 1879. Essential Histories 56. Oxford: Osprey Publishing Ltd. ISBN 9781841766126.
- Castle, Ian; Ruggeri, Raffaele (2003). Zulu War - Volunteers, Irregulars & Auxiliaries. Men-at-Arms 388. Osperey Publishing Ltd. ISBN 9781841764849.
- Knight, Ian (2013). British infantryman versus Zulu warrior: Anglo-Zulu War, 1879. Combat 3. Oxford: Osprey Pub. ISBN 978-1-78200-365-6.

== See also ==
- Natal Native Pioneer Corps
- Natal Mounted Police
