= Richard Thomas Glyn =

British Army officer (1831–1900)

Lieutenant-General Richard Thomas Glyn CB CMG
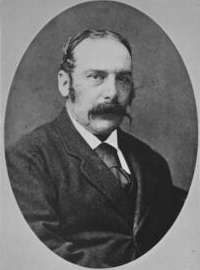
- Glyn, c. 1879
- Born: 23 December 1831; Meerut, Ceded and Conquered Provinces, Bengal Presidency, British India
- Died: 21 November 1900 (aged 68); Stratfield Saye, Hampshire, England
- Burial place: St Mary's Church, Ewell
- Military career
- Allegiance: United Kingdom
- Branch: British Army
- Service years: 1850–1887
- Rank: Lieutenant-General (honorary); Major-General (substantive)
- Unit: 24th Regiment/South Wales Borderers
- Conflicts: Crimean War; Siege of Sevastopol; Battle of the Great Redan; Indian Mutiny; Siege of Lucknow; 9th Cape Frontier War; Battle of Centane; Anglo-Zulu War; Action at Sihayo's kraal; Battle of Ulundi
- Awards: Companion of the Order of the Bath; Companion of the Order of St Michael and St George

Lieutenant-General Richard Thomas Glyn (23 December 1831 – 21 November 1900) was a British Army officer. He joined the 82nd Regiment of Foot (Prince of Wales's Volunteers) in 1850 after his father purchased him an ensign's commission. Glyn served with the regiment in the Crimean War and rose in rank to captain before transferring to the 24th (The 2nd Warwickshire) Regiment of Foot in 1856. He served with that regiment in the Indian Mutiny and was appointed to command it in 1872. In 1875 he accompanied the regiment's 1st Battalion on service in the Cape Colony, fighting with them in the 9th Cape Frontier War of 1877–78.

Glyn commanded No. 3 Column, including soldiers from both battalions of his regiment, during the first British invasion of Zululand in 1879. He led the attack on Sihayo's Kraal on 12 January, the first action of the war. The column afterwards encamped at Isandlwana where, on 22 January, Lord Chelmsford made the decision to divide his force. Chelmsford and Glyn led around half of their troops eastwards towards the Mangeni River where a Zulu force had attacked a British reconnaissance party. Whilst they were away the main Zulu royal army attacked and overran the camp at Isandlwana and inflicted heavy losses on the British defenders, many of whom were from Glyn's regiment. After the battle, Glyn's column withdrew from Zululand and he assumed command of the British garrison at Rorke's Drift. Though suffering from depression and a mental breakdown, he made orders to recover the missing Queen's Colour of the 1st Battalion and to bury the bodies of his soldiers. He was excluded from a court of enquiry held by Chelmsford into the defeat at Isandlwana and survived an attempt by Chelmsford's staff to blame him for the disaster.

Glyn commanded a brigade in the second invasion of Zululand that brought the war to an end with a British victory, for which he was appointed a Companion of the Order of St Michael and St George. He returned to the United Kingdom after the war to command the regimental depot at Brecon, Wales, and superintended the transformation of the 24th Regiment into the South Wales Borderers. Glyn was promoted to general rank before his retirement, after which he served in the ceremonial role of colonel of the regiment of the South Wales Borderers until his death.

== Early career ==
Glyn was born on 23 December 1831 in Meerut in the Ceded and Conquered Provinces of the Bengal Presidency of British India. He was the only son of Richard Carr Glyn, a civil officer of the East India Company, and Jane Florentia (née Creighton). Glyn's paternal great-grandfather was Sir Richard Glyn, 1st Baronet, of Ewell. (Note: Glyn's father, Richard Carr Glyn, was the second son of Colonel Thomas Clayton Glyn of the Coldstream Guards who had captured a French colour at the Battle of Lincelles in 1793. Thomas Clayton Glyn was the third and youngest son of the 1st Baronet. Thomas was the only one of the sons not to become a baronet; the eldest, George, inherited Sir Richard's baronetcy and the middle brother, also named Richard Carr Glyn, was created baronet in his own right, of Gaunt's House in the County of Dorset.) Glyn was baptised in Meerut on 23 February 1832 but was raised in England where he enjoyed country pursuits such as riding and hunting. He stood only 5 feet 2 inches (1.57 m) in height but was strongly built.

Glyn joined the 82nd Regiment of Foot (Prince of Wales's Volunteers) as an ensign when his father purchased him a commission on 16 August 1850. (Note: Entry into the officer corps by purchase was the norm, there were exceptions for those commissioned from the ranks, orphans of military officers, pages of honour and cadets who achieved high marks in the final examinations at the Royal Military College, Sandhurst. Glyn would have been required to sit a very basic examination and to have the patronage of a member of the landed class. The regulation cost of an ensign's commission, paid to the government and reimbursable upon retirement, was £450 (equivalent to £71,486 in 2024).) Glyn received promotion to lieutenant, also by purchase, (Note: Promotion in the army was by purchase in most cases, except where occasioned by the death of a senior officer. The opportunity to purchase promotion was offered to officers from within the regiment in order of seniority, provided they had the approval of the commanding officer. Glyn would have had to pay the difference in the regulation prices between his ensign's commission and the lieutenant's commission, £250 (equivalent to £34,750 in 2024), and to have passed an examination.) on 24 June 1853 and served with the 82nd Regiment in Ireland. He was deployed with his regiment to the Crimean War in late 1855, arriving on 2 September and being posted to the Siege of Sevastopol. Vacancies that arose in the field, such as deaths by enemy action or disease, could be filled without purchase and Glyn was promoted in this manner to the rank of captain on 7 September 1855. Glyn did not take part in combat directly but was present with his regiment at the Battle of the Great Redan on 8 September. Although the British action was unsuccessful, their allies, the French, won a victory the same day at the Battle of Malakoff that brought about the Russian withdrawal from Sevastopol. There was little more land-based combat during the war and Glyn and the 82nd Foot served only on garrison duty until the March 1856 Treaty of Paris ended the conflict. For his service in the war, he received the Crimea Medal with the Sevastopol clasp and the Ottoman Empire's Turkish Crimea Medal.

Glyn transferred to the 24th (The 2nd Warwickshire) Regiment of Foot on 30 September 1856. (Note: Transfer between two regiments in the same rank was nominally free under army regulations but often required an illegal payment to the officer agreeing to the trade, particularly if their regiment was considered more desirable.) That same year he married Ann Penelope Clements, the daughter of Lieutenant-Colonel Frederick William Clements of the Royal Canadian Rifle Regiment; they went on to have four daughters and two sons. Glyn's honeymoon was curtailed when he was posted to join his regiment in India in response to the outbreak of the Indian Mutiny. He served with General Colin Campbell's force that relieved the Siege of Lucknow in November and took part in subsequent operations that brutally quelled the rebellion by 1858. For his actions, Glyn received the Indian Mutiny Medal. The regiment raised a second battalion in 1858 and was afterwards posted on garrison duty across the British Empire. Glyn remained with the 1st Battalion in India until March 1861, being joined by his family and spending much of the time hunting.

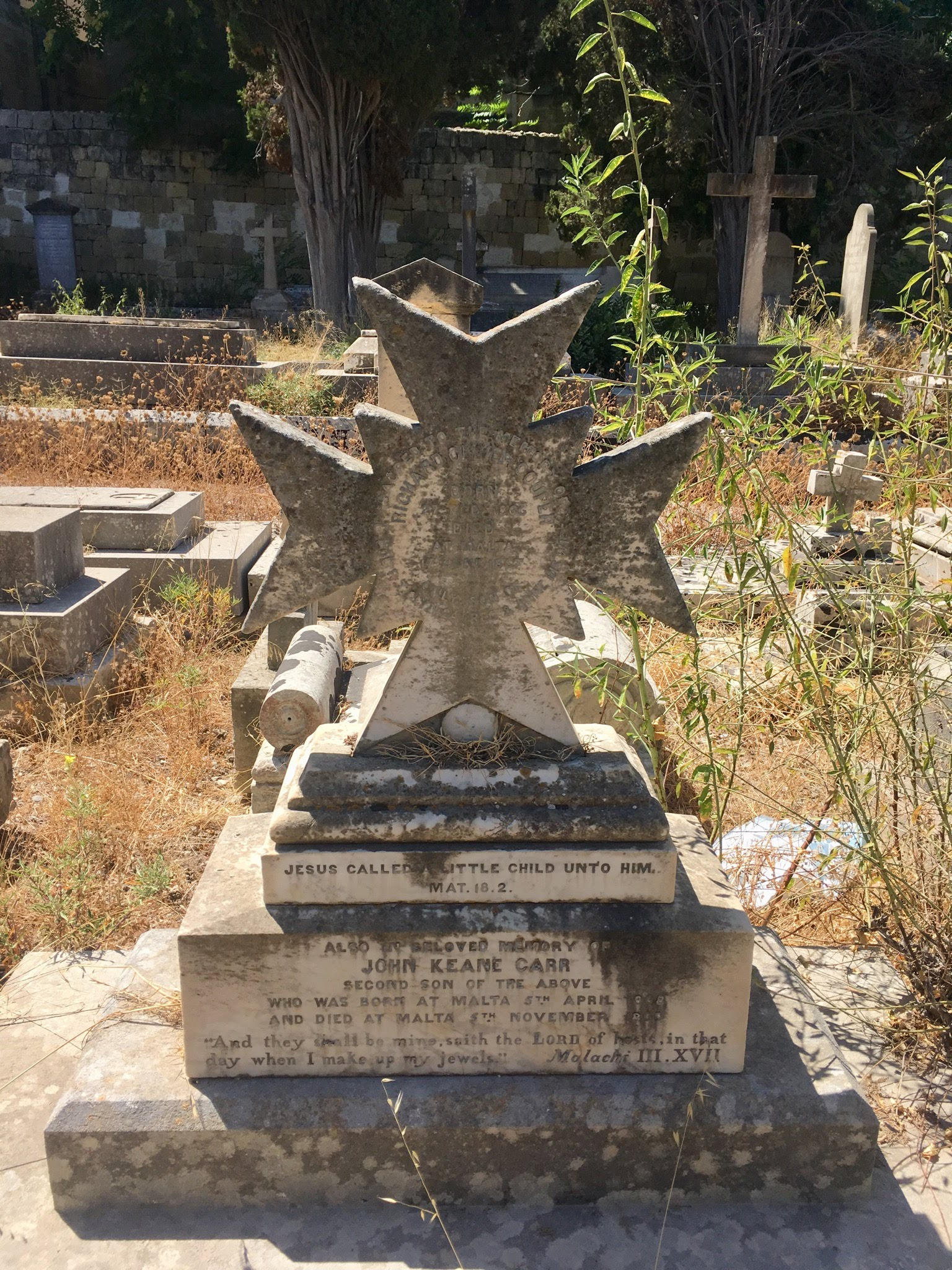
The graves of Glyn's sons in Malta

On its return to England the 1st Battalion was quartered in Gosport and Portsea on the south coast. Glyn was promoted to major by purchase on 23 July 1861. In September 1863 the battalion was posted to North Camp, Aldershot and it moved to Shorncliffe Army Camp in Kent in April 1864. In March 1865 the battalion moved to Curragh Camp, Ireland; between August 1865 and February 1866 it was deployed to Dublin as a precaution against Fenian attempts to free political prisoners from the jails. In August 1866 Glyn commanded a detachment posted to Derry; the battalion departed Ireland for Malta the following month.

Glyn's wife and their son Richard Oliver Couper, born in Steyning, Sussex on 27 February 1866, joined him in Malta. Glyn attained the rank of lieutenant colonel, also by purchase, on 13 February 1867. (Note: Lieutenant colonel was the highest rank that could be purchased in the British Army at this time; promotion beyond this had been at the discretion of the army authorities since the abolition of the purchase of colonelcies in the late 18th century. For the difference in regulation prices it would have cost Glyn £1,400 (equivalent to £194,600 in 2024) to purchase the rank of major and £1,300 (equivalent to £160,622 in 2024) for the rank of lieutenant-colonel. The purchase system was abolished by the Cardwell Reforms of 1871 and officers were reimbursed the regulation value of their current commission and an assessment of the market rate of their premium to transfer.) In Malta the battalion was quartered successively at Fort Verdala, the Floriana Lines and Fort Ricasoli. Glyn's first born son died on the island on 17 June 1867 and is buried in the Ta' Braxia Cemetery in Gwardamanġa. A second son, John Keane Carr, was born in Malta on 5 April 1868 and died there of diphtheria on 5 November 1869; he was buried in the same grave as his brother.

Glyn received command of the 24th Regiment in February 1872 and on the 13th of that month was granted the brevet rank of colonel. The battalion left Malta at the end of February for garrison duty in Gibraltar, where it was housed successively at Europa Flats, Windmill Hill and the Buena Vista Barracks. During this period Glyn spent time hunting across the border in Spain.

== Cape Colony ==
The 1st Battalion of the 24th Regiment was posted to the Cape Colony in Southern Africa in November 1875 and Glyn accompanied them; the posting gave him ample opportunity for hunting the black-backed jackal. Glyn established a formal hunt with himself as master and three of his battalion's subalterns as whips. He kept a pack of hounds which he exercised three times a week, and led expeditions lasting up to ten days at a time. Glyn and his officers also took part in hunting birds and small game animals. Glyn's family had accompanied him to the Cape, and his officers thought he was so keen on hunting (an all-male affair) because it offered an escape from his all-female household. Among his subalterns, Lieutenant Nevill Coghill, who lodged for a time with the Glyns, was a particular favourite.

American historian Donald R. Morris writing in 1965 characterised Glyn, during this period, as "a short, grouchy officer" who frequently fell out with his subordinates. British historian Adrian Greaves in 2012 described him as "steady and unflappable" but also "unimaginative and lethargic" and fortunate to have capable subordinates to see to the duties of the battalion. In 1876 Glyn led the battalion on an arduous two-month, 700-mile (1,100 km) march from Cape Town to Kimberley as the civil authorities feared a rebellion might break out in the recently established colony of Griqualand West. Upon reaching the colony, Glyn determined the swift arrival of his unit was sufficient to dissuade any potential rebels and they soon marched back to the Cape.

=== 9th Cape Frontier War ===
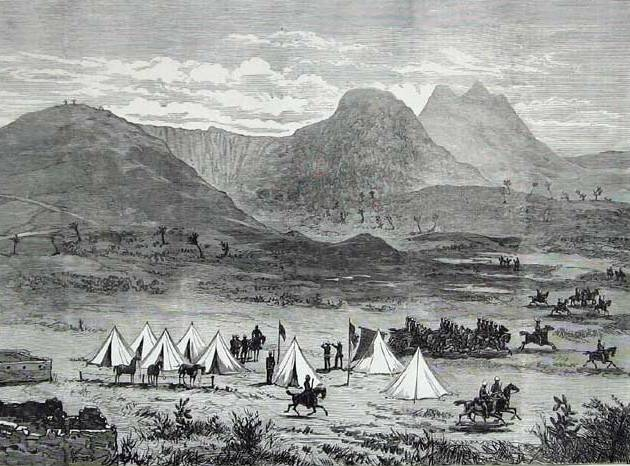
A British encampment during the war

Following the Eighth Xhosa War of 1850–53 and European settlement of British Kaffraria, the Gcaleka house of the Xhosa people were confined to a reserve between the Great Kei and Mbashe rivers. Fingoland, home of the Fengu people, former vassals of the Xhosa, was put under the protection of the Cape Colony. A drought in 1877 led to friction between the Gcaleka and the Fengu, erupting into bloodshed at a wedding feast on 3 August and starting the 9th Cape Frontier War. The Cape Colony intervened but, because of a disagreement over authority, the imperial military, of which Glyn was a part, was relegated to a defensive role. Glyn commanded the garrison at King William's Town and established a series of posts along the Great Kei River to secure the frontier. Although initially successful in defeating Xhosa attacks, the Cape Colony's expeditionary force withdrew to the British side of the frontier in mid-November after suffering severe logistical problems.

The Gcaleka convinced the Ngqika Xhosa to join them and, with the frontier threatened, the British High Commissioner for Southern Africa, Henry Bartle Frere, overrode the colonial authorities and placed the imperial army on the offensive. Glyn was granted the acting rank of brigadier-general and placed in command of the Army of the Transkei, under the overall command of Lieutenant-General Arthur Cunynghame. Few of the Cape Colony forces agreed to join the army, so it was reinforced by naval brigades and irregular mounted infantry units raised from British settlers. Following Cunynghame's orders, Glyn's troops entered the Gcaleka Reserve in three columns. The Gcaleka largely ignored the British troops and slipped across the Great Kei River to join forces with the Ngqika and threaten the British rear. Glyn's forces progressed well, defeating those Gcaleka who remained in the reserve by employing new tactics laid out in the 1877 Field Exercise and Evolution of Infantry. Rather than the traditional rigid, close order formations used by British infantry, the new manual recommended open-order skirmishing formations with individual soldiers given more freedom of movement. Despite Glyn's success, operations were suspended in early January 1878 because of the summer heat.

A contemporary British depiction of the Battle of Centane

Glyn resumed his campaign after the worst of the heat had passed, and on 13 January led a force of almost 200 troops of his battalion, together with some mounted policemen and Fengu auxiliaries, from Centane to Nyamaga to engage a Gcaleka force planning to attack the British position. Glyn's force included two RML 7-pounder mountain guns, crewed by his bandsmen due to a lack of Royal Artillery personnel. Upon coming into range of the Gcaleka, the artillery opened fire and forced the Xhosa to retreat behind a ridgeline. Glyn ordered his forces to advance and, after a short firefight, the Gcaleka withdrew from the field, pursued by the Fengu. Subsequently Glyn established bases across the Gcaleka Reserve to allow his forces to sweep the territory and destroy the Xhosa's food supply. As Glyn had intended, this left the Xhosa leaders little choice but to commit to a decisive battle. At the 7 February Battle of Centane, a force of 5,000-6,000 Xhosa attacked a British force that Glyn deployed in open skirmish lines anchored on his entrenched artillery. The weight of fire proved sufficient to prevent the Xhosa from closing with the British and around 400 Xhosa, mainly Gcaleka, were killed for the loss of two Fengu dead and nine wounded on the British side. The battle effectively ended the Gcaleka involvement in the war.

On 2 March Cunynghame was replaced by Lieutenant-General Frederic Thesiger who was able to repair relations with the Cape Colony's command and prosecute a combined war effort. March also saw the arrival of the 2nd Battalion of the 24th Regiment in Africa to join the war, an unusual instance in this period of both battalions of a foot regiment serving in the same campaign. The Ngqika raided Cape settlements before withdrawing into the forested and mountainous terrain of their reserve. With Glyn still conducting sweeping operations in the Transkei, Thesiger ordered an offensive into the Ngqika Reserve with a number of columns, including troops of the 2nd Battalion of the 24th Regiment. Exhausted by the terrain and stymied by the Ngqika's guerrilla tactics, the combined British, colonial, and Fengu forces failed to achieve a decisive victory. The offensive ended in late March, British forces withdrawing to King William's Town in early April to rest and resupply.

It was only by establishing garrisons and destroying food supplies within the Ngqika Reserve—mirroring Glyn's tactics against the Gcaleka—that Thesiger finally forced a submission in July. Glyn declared the Transkei fully pacified in August and withdrew his forces; the remaining Ngika were expelled from their lands, relocated to the Gcaleka reserve and brought under the control of white settlers. Glyn received commendations for his work during the war from the Commander-in-Chief of the Forces, Prince George, Duke of Cambridge, and from Frere. Glyn was rewarded for his service by appointment as a Companion of the Order of the Bath on 11 November 1878.

== Anglo-Zulu War ==
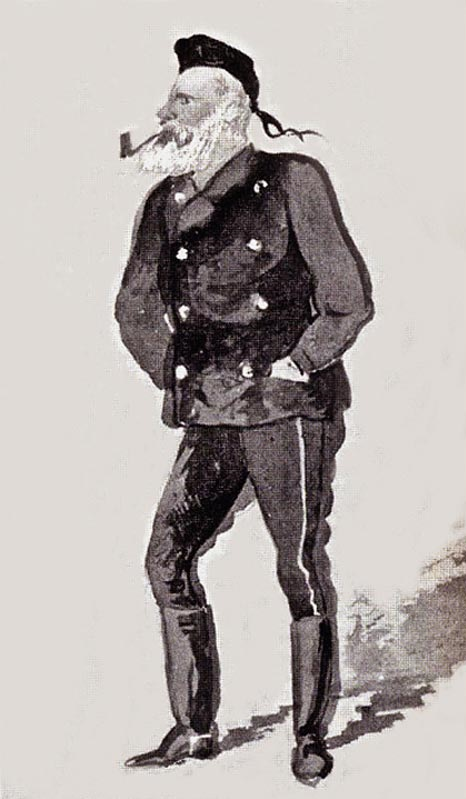
A caricature of Glyn, made during the war by staff officer Lieutenant-Colonel John North Crealock

On 23 June 1878, shortly after the end of the Cape Frontier War, Glyn's youngest daughter, Grace Penelope, died. From July 1878, the 24th Regiment began to be posted to Natal Colony for service in the planned Anglo-Zulu War. (Note: The 24th Regiment was withdrawn from the Cape Frontier War in stages. The 2nd Battalion was the first to be withdrawn in July and arrived at Pietermaritzburg on 6 August. The 1st Battalion was withdrawn by companies, the first two being sent to Natal in September. A further four infantry companies and the headquarters company reached Natal on 19 November and another infantry company joined them in the field by early January. The final company of the 1st Battalion did not participate in the war; it marched straight from King William's Town to garrison Port St. Johns which was annexed from the Mpondo people in the aftermath of the Cape Frontier War.) At this point Glyn was the second-most-senior British officer in Southern Africa after Thesiger, who had since inherited the title of Baron Chelmsford. Chelmsford planned to invade Zululand in three columns and gave Glyn command of No. 3 Column, the central and principal British force. On 30 November Glyn marched with his regiment to Helpmekaar near the border with the Zulu Kingdom. Glyn's suggestion that this post and the supply depot at Rorke's Drift be fortified was dismissed by Chelmsford.

=== First invasion ===
Chelmsford accompanied No. 3 Column during the January 1879 invasion of Zululand and allowed Glyn little independence; the general took on many of the decisions that would normally be made by the field commander and left Glyn with only routine and unimportant duties. Under Chelmsford's direct supervision, Glyn commanded the troops during the war's opening Action at Sihayo's kraal on 12 January 1879. On their way to the Zulu capital of Ulundi, No. 3 Column encamped at Isandlwana on 20 January. Chelmsford's own regulations required all camps in Zululand to be entrenched for defence and for the oxen to be enclosed in a wagon laager. Neither measure was taken at Isandlwana, as the ground was too hard and Chelmsford considered it would only be a temporary base. When Glyn suggested a laager be formed, Chelmsford dismissed the idea as "it would take a week to make one"; it had not been the practice to do so during the 9th Cape Frontier War.

Chelmsford was concerned about two Zulu chiefs, Matshana kaMondisa of the Sithole clan and Matshana kaSitshakuza of the Mchunu clan, who he thought were gathering a force near the Mangeni River that could threaten his future supply lines. On 21 January Chelmsford sent out a reconnaissance party of irregular horse and Natal Native Contingent (NNC) African auxiliary infantry towards the Mangeni. This force, commanded by Major John Dartnell, was successful in capturing some cattle but the mounted component was almost trapped by some of Matshana kaMondisa's soldiers, using their horns of the buffalo flanking tactics. The British force escaped and regrouped but false alarms overnight unnerved Dartnell, who requested support from the camp. Dartnell's report convinced Chelmsford that the main Zulu force was near the Mangeni; in fact the 20,000-strong royal army, under joint commanders Ntshingwayo Khoza and Mavumengwana kaNdlela, was to the north at Siphezi Mountain. (Note: A British patrol had spotted a large Zulu army to the north of Isandlwana on 20 January but their report was dismissed by Chelmsford.) The Zulu commanders had contemplated marching to join Matshana at the Mangeni but realised Chelmsford had divided his force and decided to strike against the weakened British camp. Ntshingwayo and Mavumengwana repositioned their army close to Isandlwana over the night of 21/22 January, travelling in small groups which largely escaped the attention of British patrols.

On the morning of 22 January, Glyn accompanied Chelmsford and around half of the column (including six companies of the 2nd Battalion of the 24th Regiment) to the Mangeni to support Dartnell. Lieutenant-Colonel Henry Pulleine, of the 1st Battalion of the 24th Regiment, was left in command of the camp with five companies of his troops and one from the 2nd Battalion. (Note: The rest of the regiment was on garrison duty: the remaining company of the 2nd Battalion was posted to Rorke's Drift and two companies of the 1st Battalion were at nearby Helpmekaar.) Pulleine was later joined by the more senior Colonel Anthony Durnford, who arrived with additional troops. During Glyn's absence, the Zulu royal army attacked the camp at the Battle of Isandlwana. Pulleine deployed his troops in the open order tactics Glyn and Chelmsford had used in the 9th Frontier War. The British position was outflanked by the Zulu horn tactics. The camp was overrun and most of the defenders killed, including Durnford, Pulleine and almost 600 soldiers of the 24th Regiment. Glyn was sent by Chelmsford to secure the site of the next camp near Mangeni Falls, but he and his troops were hurriedly recalled when news of the disaster reached the general. Chelmsford's force reached Isandlwana after the battle was over and passed the night there; fear of a Zulu attack required the soldiers to remain awake in a defensive square all night and prevented the burial of the dead. The next day, the force reached Rorke's Drift which a small British garrison of one company of the 2nd Battalion of the 24th Regiment had successfully defended against a Zulu attack.

Glyn's post-battle report on Isandlwana was emotional and written, in part, as an attempt to vindicate the actions of his officers in the battle. Because there were so few British survivors, some aspects were pure speculation. The report was the first official record of the actions of Lieutenants Teignmouth Melvill and Nevill Coghill, who had made an attempt to save the Queen's Colour of the 1st Battalion of the 24th Regiment but were killed whilst fleeing the battlefield. (Note: This colour was received by Glyn on parade at Curragh Camp in 1866 from the Countess of Kimberley, the wife of John Wodehouse, 1st Earl of Kimberley.) After reading an account of Melvill and Coghill's actions from eyewitness Lieutenant Walter Higginson of the NNC, Glyn ordered a party to Isandlwana on 4 February to bury their bodies. A second party sent by Glyn later recovered the remains of the colour. The damaged colour was retrieved and later repaired by Glyn's wife Anne; it remained in use by the regiment until 1933.

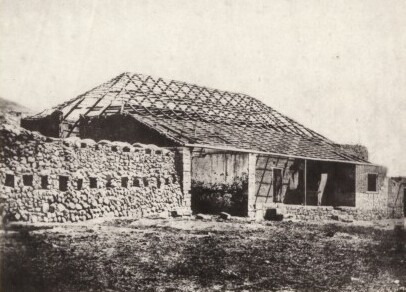
The post at Rorke's Drift, fortified after the battle as Fort Bromhead

Chelmsford gave Glyn command of Rorke's Drift. Glyn led a demoralised force, isolated from any immediate assistance and in fear of Zulu attack. Rainy conditions and outbreaks of dysentery, bilious fever and typhoid did not help matters, nor did Glyn's orders confining most of the garrison to the interior of the post. On 24 January the NNC at the post mutinied, fearful for the safety of their families and unhappy at being left outside the post at night; after disarming them Glyn permitted them to leave. Glyn arranged the fortification of the post into Fort Bromhead, and later established a new fort near the Buffalo River, Fort Melvill. (Note: The first fort was named for Gonville Bromhead, who had led B Company of the 2nd Battalion of the 24th Regiment in the Battle of Rorke's Drift, and the second for Lieutenant Teignmouth Melvill.) Glyn's command was dysfunctional as he was affected by depression; he suffered a temporary mental breakdown, took little interest in his work and remarked that he should have been with his troops at Isandlwana. Captain Walter Jones of the Royal Engineers, present at Rorke's Drift in this period, noted "Col. Glyn (our chief) does nothing and is effete [exhausted]". (Note: "Effete" is a skunked term. In this period it meant "exhausted", the common modern usage to mean "snobbish" or "effeminate" didn't arise until the 20th century.) The 24th Regiment's dead at Isandlwana went unburied until 20 June as Glyn insisted on the work being done by soldiers of his regiment.

When Chelmsford held a court of inquiry into the defeat at Isandlwana on 27 January he deliberately restricted the evidence it heard and many eyewitnesses, including Glyn, were not called to provide testimony. This decision was seen by the contemporary press as a means of Chelmsford controlling the narrative. The court's final report made Durnford a scapegoat; it stated, falsely, that Chelmsford had ordered Durnford to take command of the camp and that he had ordered Pulleine to move troops into the open. Chelmsford's staff, led by his military secretary, Lieutenant-Colonel John North Crealock, later also attempted to deflect blame onto Glyn, who was isolated at Rorke's Drift. Advised by his staff officer Major Francis Clery, Glyn refused to answer written requests for an account of his interpretation of Chelmsford's orders relating to the camp, and to state who had ordered the movement of troops in or out of the camp. Glyn's reply only stated it was "odd the general asking me to tell him what he knows more than I do". Glyn's wife, Ann, was indignant at his treatment and robustly defended him, which, together with Chelmsford's disapproval, forced Chelmsford's staff to cease this line of action. Chelmsford wrote to the Commander-in-Chief of the Forces, Prince George, Duke of Cambridge, on 27 March to assure him that he had "no desire to cast any blame upon Colonel Glyn". He also rebuked Crealock for his ungentlemanly conduct and sent a letter to Glyn distancing himself from the actions of his staff.

=== Second invasion ===
By the end of April, Glyn was at Dundee, Natal, where Chelmsford was assembling the 2nd Division to lead the second invasion of Zululand. Chelmsford visited the camp and expressed shock at the lack of defensive measures taken, in a letter to Colonel Evelyn Wood he said "the camp here shows that neither [Glyn] nor Clery have learned anything from Isandlwana", and he insisted on the site being entrenched. Glyn led the division's 1st Brigade during the advance on the Zulu capital of Ulundi, although Chelmsford noted he had made the appointment reluctantly "as there is absolutely no one who is better". (Note: Glyn's brigade included the remains of the 2nd Battalion of the 24th Regiment; the 1st Battalion, augmented by drafts from Britain, was part of the 2nd Brigade. Neither unit saw much action during the second invasion, being employed mostly on garrison duties.) The division was commanded by newly arrived Major-General Edward Newdigate, but it was accompanied in the field by Chelmsford, who again assumed effective control of it.

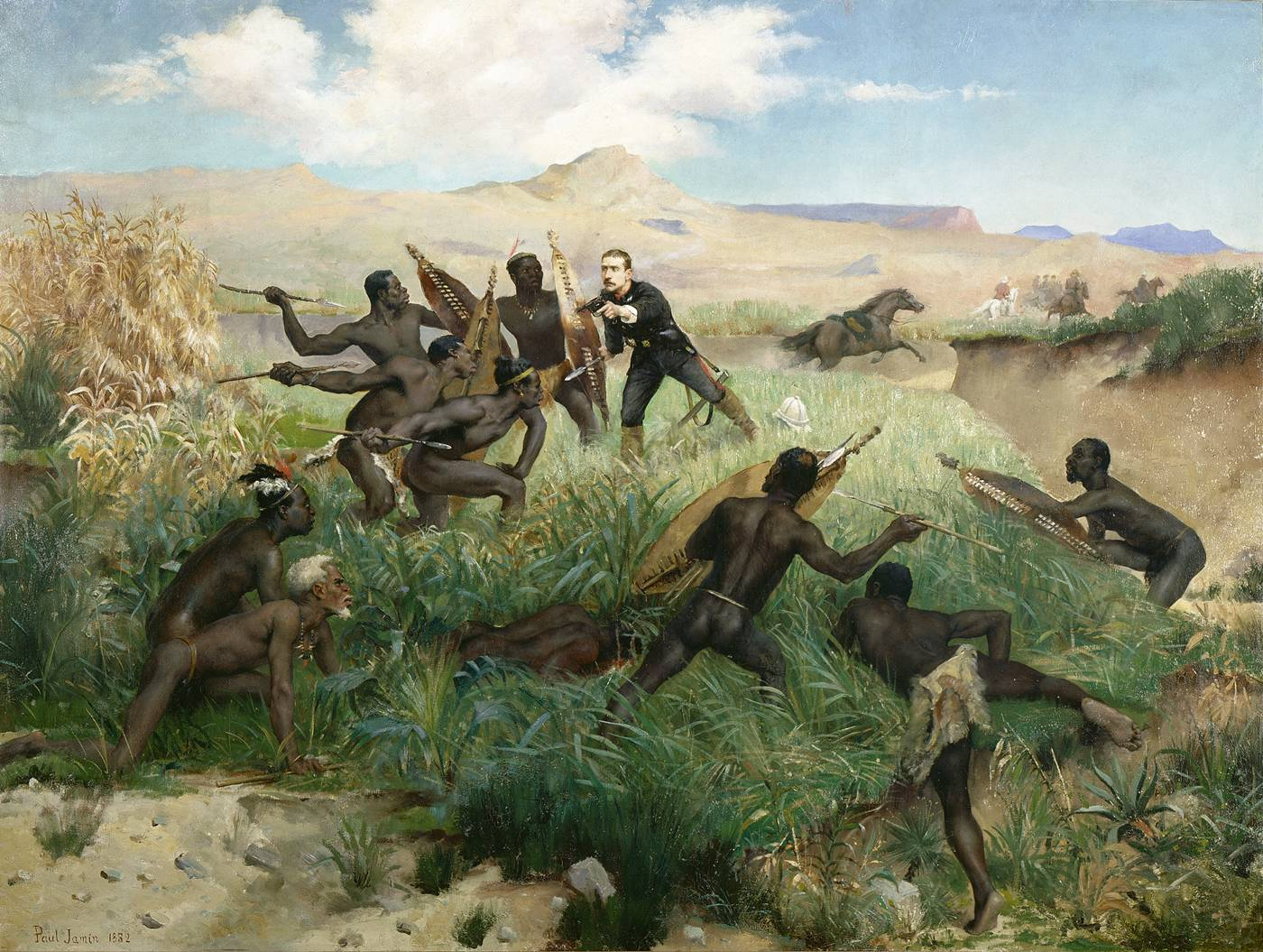
A contemporary depiction of the death of the Prince Imperial by Paul Jamin

The division left Dundee on 31 May on a slow and careful advance towards Ulundi. Following the 1 June death in action of Louis-Napoléon, Prince Imperial, Glyn served as president of the court martial of Lieutenant Jahleel Brenton Carey, who had commanded the patrol the Prince had accompanied. Carey was found guilty of misbehaviour before the enemy for riding off from the scene of the action, but the court could not decide on a punishment and he was sent back to Britain. The Judge Advocate General, James Cornelius O'Dowd, found the conviction unsound as the Prince had exercised effective command of the patrol, and quashed it.

Glyn commanded his brigade at the 5 July Battle of Ulundi, the decisive last major battle of the war, which ended in a British victory. The British force, more than 5,000 strong and supported by 12 artillery pieces and 2 gatling guns, formed a large infantry square which advanced on the Zulu capital. The Zulu army of 15–20,000 soldiers was largely unable to reach within 100 yards (91 m) of the British line due to their superior firepower. Recognising the rear of the square, where Glyn's brigade was positioned, as its weak point, a group of 2–3,000 Zulu were able to approach more closely by making use of cover. Charging Zulus reached within nine paces of the British troops, occasioning some alarm in Chelmsford and causing Newdigate to draw his revolver, before they were repelled by rifle fire and canister shot. Afterwards the disheartened Zulu were charged by British cavalry. Zulu casualties were around 1,500 killed or wounded, compared to 13 British soldiers killed and 69 wounded. On 8 July Chelmsford was superseded in command by Lieutenant-General Garnet Wolseley, Wolseley secured the surrender of most Zulu chiefs and his forces captured the Zulu king Cetshwayo on 28 August. British troops left Zululand by 20 September and the Zulu state was fragmented into 13 chiefdoms, setting the seeds for years of civil war and economic hardship.

Glyn returned to Natal by 26 August when he presided over a Victoria Cross presentation ceremony held in front of soldiers of his regiment, the 3rd Regiment (Buffs) and the 17th Lancers at Pinetown. The officers Glyn honoured were Lieutenant Edward Stevenson Browne of the 1st Battalion of the 24th Regiment, for his actions at the Battle of Hlobane, and Surgeon Major James Henry Reynolds of the Army Medical Department, for his service during the defence of Rorke's Drift.

== Later career and death ==
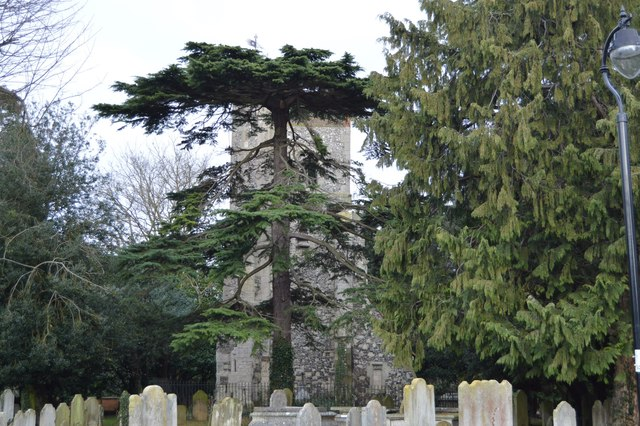
Glyn's tomb is the grey cross in the centre of this image, sited between the Mediaeval tower of the former St Mary's Church and the railings

After the Zulu War, Glyn returned to the United Kingdom with his family in September 1879. (Note: The 1st Battalion of the 24th Regiment also left for England around this time, the 2nd Battalion remained in Southern Africa until January 1880 when it departed for garrison duty at Gibraltar.) He relinquished his regimental command in May 1880 and was appointed to command the regiment's depot at Brecon, Wales, on half pay. Glyn was appointed a Companion of the Order of St Michael and St George on 30 October 1880 for his services in the Zulu War. He superintended the change of his regiment's name to the South Wales Borderers under the 1881 Childers Reforms, and was given command of the 24th Regimental District created by the reforms.

Glyn was promoted to major-general on 30 September 1882 and his appointment as commander of the regimental district ended on 6 December 1882. He was promoted to the honorary rank of lieutenant-general shortly before he retired on 30 September 1887. In retirement Glyn lived in Stratfield Saye in Hampshire; his final years were gloomy, haunted by the memory of Isandlwana. Glyn was appointed to the ceremonial role of colonel of the regiment of the South Wales Borderers on 29 May 1898.

Glyn died at his home, Chequers, in Stratfield Saye, on 21 November 1900, aged 68, not long after witnessing his regiment depart for Southern Africa for service in the Second Boer War. He is buried in his family's plot at St Mary's Church in Ewell, Surrey. A hoof from his horse, Yellow Rose, serves as an ash tray in the officers' dining room of the Royal Welsh, the successor regiment of the South Wales Borderers. Glyn's wife Ann died in 1927; three of their daughters survived into adulthood: Annie Jane who married William Maxwell Brander, a lieutenant-colonel in the 24th Regiment; (Note: Annie and William's son, Maxwell Brander, became an officer in the Royal Army Service Corps and served as a major-general in the Second World War.) Elizabeth Mary, who married Charles de Winton of Breconshire; and Alice Farquhar.

== Bibliography ==
- Bancroft, James W. (2022). The Rorke's Drift Commanders: Gonville Bromhead and John Chard. Barnsley, England: Pen & Sword. ISBN 978-1-3990-0997-3.
- Bruce, Anthony Peter Charles (1980). The Purchase System in the British Army, 1660-1871. London: Royal Historical Society. ISBN 978-0-901050-57-1 – via Internet Archive.
- Debrett's (1896). Debrett's Peerage, Baronetage, Knightage, and Companionage. London: Dean & Son.
- Debrett's (1931). Debrett's Illustrated Baronetage, with the Knightage, of the United Kingdom of Great Britain and Ireland. London: Dean & Son.
- Debrett's (1955). Debrett's Peerage and Baronetage. London: Odhams Press.
- Foster, Joseph (1881). The Baronetage and Knightage. Westminster: Nichols and Sons.
- Garner, Bryan A. (2022). Garner's Modern English Usage. Oxford, England: Oxford University Press. ISBN 978-0-19-759904-4.
- Greaves, Adrian (2005). Crossing the Buffalo: The Zulu War of 1879. London: Cassell. ISBN 978-0-3043-6725-2.
- Greaves, Adrian (2012). Rorke's Drift. London: Orion. ISBN 978-1-78022-497-8.
- Greaves, Adrian; Knight, Ian (2006). Who's Who in the Zulu War, 1879: The British. Barnsley, England: Pen & Sword. ISBN 1-84415-479-3.
- Hart, Henry George (1854). The New Annual Army List and Militia List (PDF). London: John Murray.
- Hart, Henry George (1880). New Annual Army List, Militia List, and Indian Civil Service List (PDF). London: John Murray.
- Hayes, James (1961). "The Purchase of Colonelcies in the Army, 1714-63". Journal of the Society for Army Historical Research. 39 (157): 3–10. ISSN 0037-9700.
- Knight, Ian (1992). Zulu: Isandlwana and Rorke's Drift 22nd – 23rd January 1879. London: Windrow & Greene. ISBN 978-1-872004-23-5.
- Knight, Ian (2023). Warriors in Scarlet: The Life and Times of the Last Redcoats. London: Pan Macmillan. ISBN 978-0-230-76731-7.
- Laband, John (2009). Historical Dictionary of the Zulu Wars. Lanham, Maryland, US: Scarecrow Press. ISBN 978-0-8108-6300-2.
- Laband, John (2023). In the Shadow of Isandlwana: The Life and Times of General Lord Chelmsford and his Disaster in Zululand. Barnsley, England: Greenhill Books. ISBN 978-1-78438-771-6.
- Lodge, Edmund (1907). The Peerage, Baronetage, Knightage & Companionage of the British Empire for 1907. London: Kelly's Directories.
- Morris, Donald R. (1965). The Washing of the Spears. New York: Pen and Sword. ISBN 067-1-63108-X.
- Paton, George; Glennie, Farquhar; Symons, William Penn; Moffatt, H. B., eds. (1892). Historical Records of the 24th Regiment, from Its Formation, in 1689. London: Simpkin, Marshall , Hamilton, Kent & Co – via Internet Archive.
- Rothwell, Captain J. S. (1989) [1881]. Narrative of the Field Operations Connected with the Zulu War of 1879. London: Greenhill Books. ISBN 1-85367-041-3. OL 8980321M – via Quartermaster General's Department, Intelligence Branch, War Office.
- Skeat, Walter William (1882). An Etymological Dictionary of the English Language. Oxford, England: Clarendon Press.
- Smith, Keith (2014). Dead Was Everything: Studies in the Anglo-Zulu War. Barnsley, England: Frontline Books. ISBN 978-1-4738-3723-2.
- Snook, Mike (2010). Like Wolves on the Fold : the Defence of Rorke's Drift. London: Greenhill Books. ISBN 978-1-84832-602-6.
- Walford, Edward (1893). The Windsor Peerage for 1893. London: Chatto & Windus.
