= Action at Sihayo's kraal =

1879 skirmish in the Anglo-Zulu War

- Part of the Anglo-Zulu War
- A contemporary British depiction of the action. The Zulu hold the cliffs in the midground while elements of the British 24th Regiment and Natal Native Contingent advance against them; British mounted troops can be seen on the horizon and Lieutenant-General Lord Chelmsford observes from the centre foreground.
Date	12 January 1879
Location	Zululand 28.313°S 30.611°E
Result	British victory

Belligerents
British Empire	Zulu Kingdom

Commanders and leaders
(United Kingdom of Great Britain and Ireland) Lord Chelmsford (United Kingdom of Great Britain and Ireland) Richard Thomas Glyn	Mkumbikazulu kaSihayo †

Strength
3 companies 24th Regiment of Foot; 1 battalion Natal Native Contingent (NNC); A mixed unit of mounted infantry	200–300 warriors

Casualties and losses
2 NNC men killed; At least 14 wounded	30 killed; 4 wounded; 10 captured
- Approximate location in present-day South Africa

The 12 January 1879 action at Sihayo's kraal was an early skirmish in the Anglo-Zulu War. The day after launching an invasion of Zululand, the British Lieutenant-General Lord Chelmsford led a reconnaissance in force against the kraal (Note: Kraal was a term used in contemporary British English and Afrikaans to refer to a Zulu settlement. More properly the term refers to the livestock enclosure at the centre of such settlements; this was surrounded by dome-shaped huts and a stockade fence. There were two types of kraal: the homestead of a family grouping, known in Zulu as an umuzi (plural imizi), and what the British called a "military kraal", the ikhanda (plural amakhanda), a headquarters for the Zulu age-grouped social unit which, in times of war, functioned as a regiment. Sihayo's kraal was an umuzi. Modern sources have given the name of the kraal as kwaSokhexe, kwaSoxhege ("the maze") and kwaSogekle. The actual military engagement took place some distance away from the kraal but the action has been named in reference to it, for example the "gunfight at Sihayo's", "skirmish at Chief Sihayo's homestead" and "attack on kwaSokhexe".) of Zulu Chief Sihayo kaXongo. This was intended to secure his left flank for an advance on the Zulu capital at Ulundi and as retribution against Sihayo for the incursion of his sons into the neighbouring British Colony of Natal.

En route to the kraal the British force found a small party of Zulus in a horseshoe-shaped gorge. A frontal assault was launched by auxiliary troops from the Natal Native Contingent (NNC), supported by British regulars, while a mixed unit of mounted infantry moved onto the high ground to the rear of the Zulus. After the NNC attack faltered the regulars reinvigorated the attack and defeated the Zulus in the gorge. The mounted force engaged around 60 Zulus on the high ground and drove them off. The Zulu force suffered losses of around 30 killed (including their commander, Mkumbikazulu kaSihayo), 4 wounded and 10 captured. The British lost 2 members of the NNC killed and at least 14 wounded.

After their victory the British moved on Sihayo's kraal, which they found to be undefended; they burned it down and returned to their camp. The action is believed to have led the Zulu king, Cetshwayo, to order an attack on Chelmsford's force in preference to the two other British columns operating in Zululand. Much of Chelmsford's column was destroyed at the Battle of Isandlwana 10 days later.

== Background ==
The British government had shown little interest in Southern Africa aside from the maintenance of a naval base at the Cape of Good Hope. This changed with the discovery of valuable mineral deposits and by the 1870s it was British policy to exert greater control over the region. In 1877 Sir Henry Bartle Frere was appointed as High Commissioner for Southern Africa with a mandate to bring the existing colonies, indigenous African groups and the Boer republics under British authority. Frere viewed the independent Zulu Kingdom as a possible threat to this plan and sought an excuse to declare war and annexe it. He established a boundary commission to look into a dispute between Zululand and the Boer Transvaal, which had been recently annexed by the British, hoping for an outcome that would enrage the Zulu king, Cetshwayo. However, when the report was produced it largely backed the Zulu claim.

Frere instead seized on an incident in July 1878. Two wives of Zulu chief Sihayo kaXongo fled from his kraal into the British colony of Natal. Two of Sihayo's sons crossed into Natal with an armed band, seized the women and returned them to Zululand where they were executed. Frere mobilised British troops on the border and requested a meeting with Cetshwayo's representatives in December, ostensibly to discuss the report of the boundary commission. Frere instead presented them with an ultimatum. Cetshwayo was required to turn over Sihayo's sons to face British justice and turn over the chief Mbilini waMswati to the Transvaal courts for raiding as well as paying a fine of cattle for these offences and the 1878 Natal–Zululand border incident. Frere also demanded wholesale changes to the Zulu system of government including limits on the use of the death penalty, the requirement for judicial trials, supervision by a British official, admission of Christian missionaries and the abolition of the Zulu social/army system and the associated restrictions on marriage. The ultimatum was harsh, demanding radical change in the Zulu way of life, and it was intended by Frere that Cetshwayo would reject it. Emissaries sent by Cetshwayo requesting an extension to the ultimatum deadline were ignored.

A contemporary depiction of Chelmford's column crossing the Buffalo River. The column is led by Russell's mounted infantry, followed by Dartnell's Natal Mounted Police and other irregulars, behind them is part of the 1st Battalion of the 24th Regiment and, in the foreground, a detachment of artillery.

On 11 January 1879 the ultimatum expired and British forces, under Lieutenant-General Lord Chelmsford entered Zululand in three columns. One column operated close to the eastern coastline and one advanced from the Transvaal in the west. (Note: The Transvaal or northern column, under Colonel Evelyn Wood crossed into Zululand on 6 January, before the expiry of the ultimatum.) The main force, the Centre Column under Chelmsford, crossed the Buffalo River into Zulu territory at Rorke's Drift (Note: "Drift" is the Boer term for a river crossing or ford. Chelmsford had selected Rorke's Drift as the entry point into Zululand for his principal column in the mistaken belief that Boer leader Andries Pretorius had used the route for his invasion of 1838; he had actually crossed near to Dundee some 40 miles (64 km) upstream. Chelmsford's selection of a route from Rorke's Drift to the Zulu capital Ulundi lay along a "road" that was little more than a faint track left by occasional trade wagons with parts liable to become very boggy in the rainy season that the British found themselves campaigning in.) and made camp on the far side. On 6 January Chelmsford had written to Frere that he had received reports that Sihayo had assembled 8,000 men to attack the British when they made their crossing, but it was unopposed.

Chelmsford determined to attack Sihayo's kraal which lay some 8 km (5.0 mi) from his camp. He intended this to secure his left flank for the advance upon the Zulu capital of Ulundi and as a punitive measure against Sihayo. Chelmsford thought that an attack on Sihayo would show the British government that he was acting against the Zulu leadership, particularly those mentioned in the ultimatum, and not against the Zulu people in general. A reconnaissance party of the Natal Mounted Police under Major John Dartnell were dispatched on the first day of the invasion. Dartnell's force approached Sihayo's kraal along the Bashee River valley and returned to Chelmsford's camp by that evening; he reported hearing war songs being sung by a large party of Zulu in the valley but could not locate them. Other scouting parties sent in other directions captured many Zulu cattle.

== Advance ==
Chelmsford ordered a force, led by Colonel Richard Glyn of the 24th Regiment of Foot, to leave the camp at 3:30 am on 12 January; this was later described as a reconnaissance in force. Glyn's command was a mixed force of men from his regiment; auxiliary troops of the 3rd Regiment Natal Native Contingent (NNC, Major Wilsone Black) and some irregular mounted infantry, commanded by Lieutenant-Colonel John Cecil Russell. (Note: Black had been seconded from the 24th Regiment by Chelmsford to temporarily command the 3rd NNC. Their usual commander, colonial officer Commandant Rupert la Trobe Lonsdale was recovering from concussion received after falling from his horse.) Chelmsford accompanied the force; Glyn was in formal command but Chelmsford was prone to interfere in tactical matters and helped direct the movement of the column. This led to uncertainty over the division of responsibility in the column, which was not helped by a rift between Glyn's chief of staff Major Francis Clery and Chelmsford's, Lieutenant-Colonel John Crealock.

The British troops proceeded north-east from the camp, keeping to a track on the west side of the Bashee River. After around 8 km (5.0 mi) a quantity of cattle and other livestock were observed on the far side with several Zulus to the hills above them. Chelmsford ordered the force to cross the river and prepare for action. While Glyn and Chelmsford consulted on their battle plan, the Zulus taunted the British, shouting "Why are you waiting there? Are you looking to build kraals? Why don't you come on up?".

== Action ==
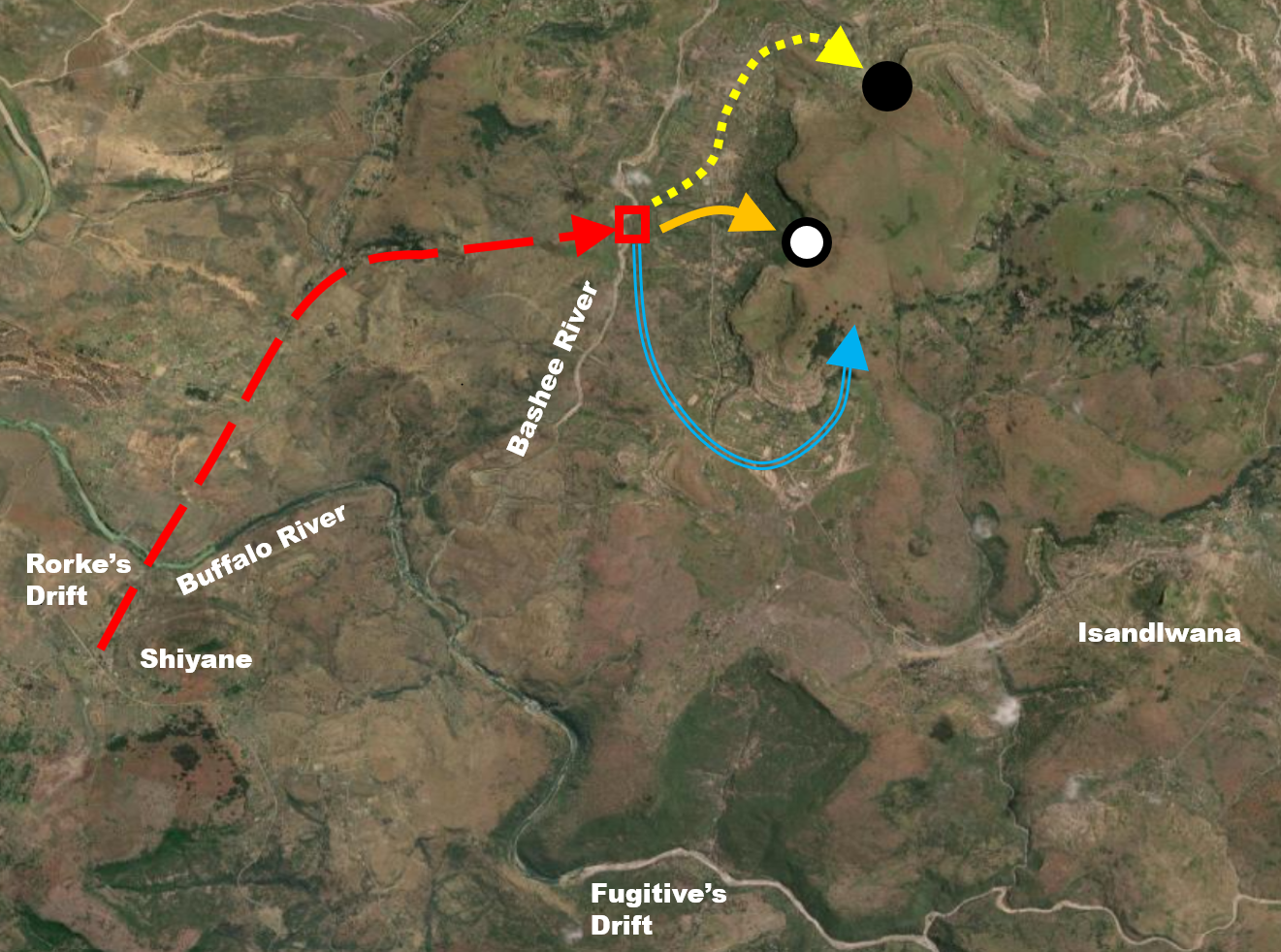
Movements during the action at Sihayo's kraal overlaid on a modern satellite image. British advance Movement of 1/24th and 1/3rd NNC Initial engagement Movement of mounted units Advance on kraal Sihayo's kraal The locations and movements are as per Smith (2014, p. 29) and Knight (1992, p. 41).

The Zulu defenders, from Sihayo's Qungebe people, were commanded by Mkumbikazulu kaSihayo, one of Sihayo's sons who had been involved in the Natal raid. They held a horseshoe-shaped gorge on a steep hillside, part of Ngedla Hill. The open end of the gorge faced towards the Bashee River and the base of the cliffs were covered with boulders and scrub. Sihayo's kraal lay further to the north on a more gently sloping part of the hill.

Chelmsford and Glyn determined to clear the Zulu from the gorge before proceeding to the kraal to burn it. Chelmsford ordered Russell's mounted infantry to move to the south where the slope was climbable and to sweep around behind the Zulus on the heights to threaten them and cut off any retreat. In the meantime, the entire 1st Battalion of the 3rd Regiment of the NNC (under Commandant George Hamilton-Browne) were to assault the Zulus on the lower ground and attempt to seize the cattle, supported by three companies of the 1st Battalion of the 24th Regiment (commanded by Captain William Degacher). The 2nd Battalion of the 3rd Regiment of the NNC (commanded by Commandant Edward Russell Cooper) and other men from the 24th Regiment of Foot, including four companies of the 2nd Battalion, were held in reserve.

The NNC, under Hamilton-Browne, led the attack, probably beginning a little after 8.00 am. He had been ordered by Chelmsford not to open fire before the Zulu did and to avoid harming any Zulu women or children. Hamilton-Browne was worried about the prospect of friendly fire from his poorly trained men and ordered them not to use their firearms at all. The NNC had received little training in military drill and Hamilton-Browne's non-commissioned officers soon gave up attempts to keep the NNC in line during their advance.

As the British column approached, the Zulu herdsmen drove the livestock deeper into the gorge and raised the alarm. The NNC were in good spirits until they came within gunshot of the "several score" Zulu warriors who were hiding among boulders, shrubs and caves at the edges of the gorge. At this point they were challenged by a Zulu shouting "By whose orders do you come to the land of the Zulus?". A newspaper reporter with the British, Charles Norris-Newman, recorded that no reply was made but Hamilton-Browne noted that his interpreter, Lieutenant R. Duncombe, replied "By the orders of the Great White Queen". The Zulus then opened fire on the British right flank, their first shot striking an NNC man and breaking his thigh bone.

A depiction of Hamilton-Browne during the action from his own 1912 book of his experiences in Southern Africa

The NNC became pinned down, but Hamilton-Browne led one company to assault the Zulus in the rough ground. The assault was successful in clearing the base of the gorge, and capturing women and children, who were sent to the rear. The Zulu warriors retreated up a steep path leading to the top of the cliffs.

The path was barricaded and covered by concealed marksmen and, seeing the NNC falter, Black and a staff officer, Captain Henry Harford moved forward to support Hamilton-Browne. On the way Harford spotted a Zulu taking aim at Glyn, who was observing from open ground, and shouted a warning, preventing his injury or death. Black moved between parties of the NNC trying, largely in vain, to encourage them forwards. (Note: The 1/3rd NNC contained three companies of Zulu warriors from the inDluyengwe regiment. They had fled the Zulu kingdom after being attacked by the rival inGobamakhosi regiment, which was led by Mehlokazulu, one of Sihayo's sons. They were well regarded for their courage and one company was present in the action at Sihayo's kraal; they were the only one to follow Black's order to close with the Zulu.) Attempts by the NNC non-commissioned officers to force their men forwards by clubbing them with rifle butts also failed. Harford rallied a group of NNC men and made some forward progress, clearing caves in the cliff face. The men of the 24th also advanced, their rifles with fixed bayonets proving an encouragement to the NNC.

The men of the NNC with rifles opened fire, causing the company under Hamilton-Browne at the foot of the cliffs, who were also under fire from the Zulus, to take cover. Black once more tried to lead the NNC in an attack; waving his hat over his head in one hand and brandishing his sword in the other. Black's hat was shot out of his hand and he was struck "below the belt" by a boulder thrown from the cliffs, causing pain but no injury and halting his advance.

Part of the 2nd Battalion of the NNC was also brought up in support but the action on the low ground was over by 9:00 am, as the NNC and men from the 24th Regiment climbed the cliffs elsewhere and outflanked the Zulus holding the path. Around a dozen Zulus were killed in action in the gorge along with two NNC men.

In the meantime, Russell's mounted contingent had also reached the heights. His force was split in two with the Natal Mounted Police and Natal Carbineers on the left and the other men on the right, out of sight of each other. The left unit came under fire from a party of 60 Zulus on rocky ground. They dismounted and advanced in skirmish order, returning fire. The Zulus were driven off by 10:00 am, with losses of between ten and eighteen dead and no British casualties. The right-hand party captured Zulu horses but otherwise had an uneventful day, except for narrowly avoiding a friendly fire incident with a party of the NNC who had removed their distinguishing red headbands to avoid attack by the Zulus.

== Burning of the kraal ==
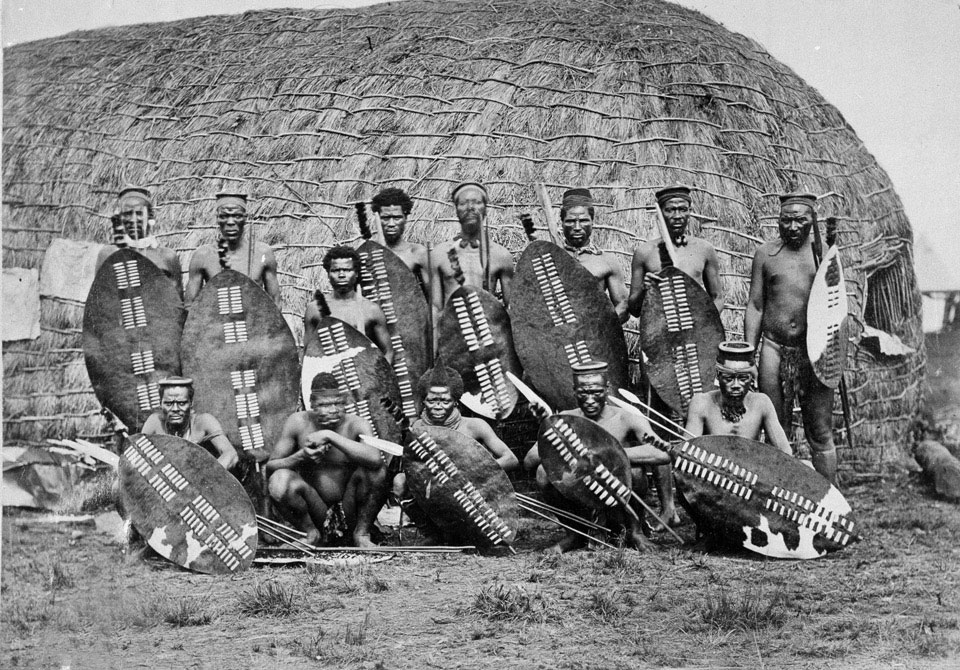
An 1879 photograph of members of the NNC in front of a Zulu-style hut

After the action a force of four companies of the 2/24th and part of the 2nd Battalion of the 3rd NNC, under the overall command of Colonel Henry Degacher of the 24th Regiment was sent to Sihayo's kraal with orders to raze it. The kraal was located further up the Bashee valley and 60 metres (200 ft) above it. Degacher led a cautious advance in skirmish order. This was witnessed by men of the 1st Battalion who, being on higher ground could see that the kraal was unoccupied and good humouredly mocked their comrades. Degacher's men then marched into the kraal and burnt it to the ground. Three old women and a young girl were found nearby but no male Zulu. British forces took some obsolete firearms, a brand-new wagon and some of Sihayo's carved wooden prestige staffs from the kraal as well as much livestock.

The entire force marched back to its camp by the Buffalo River, reaching it by 4:00 pm. The march was affected by a heavy thunderstorm and Chelmsford allowed the force a day off on 13 January to rest and dry their equipment. The force was afterwards engaged in guard duties, reconnaissance and preparing the roadway into Zululand. The force left camp early on 20 January and reached the next camp, at Isandlwana, by noon.

== Aftermath ==
The British commanders were reasonably pleased with the day's events and considered that the NNC had performed well in their first action. The total Zulu casualties were estimated by the British at thirty killed, including Mkumbikazulu kaSihayo, four wounded and ten captured. The prisoners were interrogated with physical violence but did not reveal the presence of the Zulu field army, 25,000 warriors and 10,000 followers and reserves, which was then at a position just over 30 kilometres (20 mi) from the Centre Column. The able-bodied prisoners were released on 13 January and took refuge at Sotondose's Drift. Chelmsford's orders were to release the wounded prisoners once they had recovered. One of the prisoners received treatment at the British hospital at Rorke's Drift and was killed by the Zulu when they stormed the hospital during the Battle of Rorke's Drift on 22/23 January.

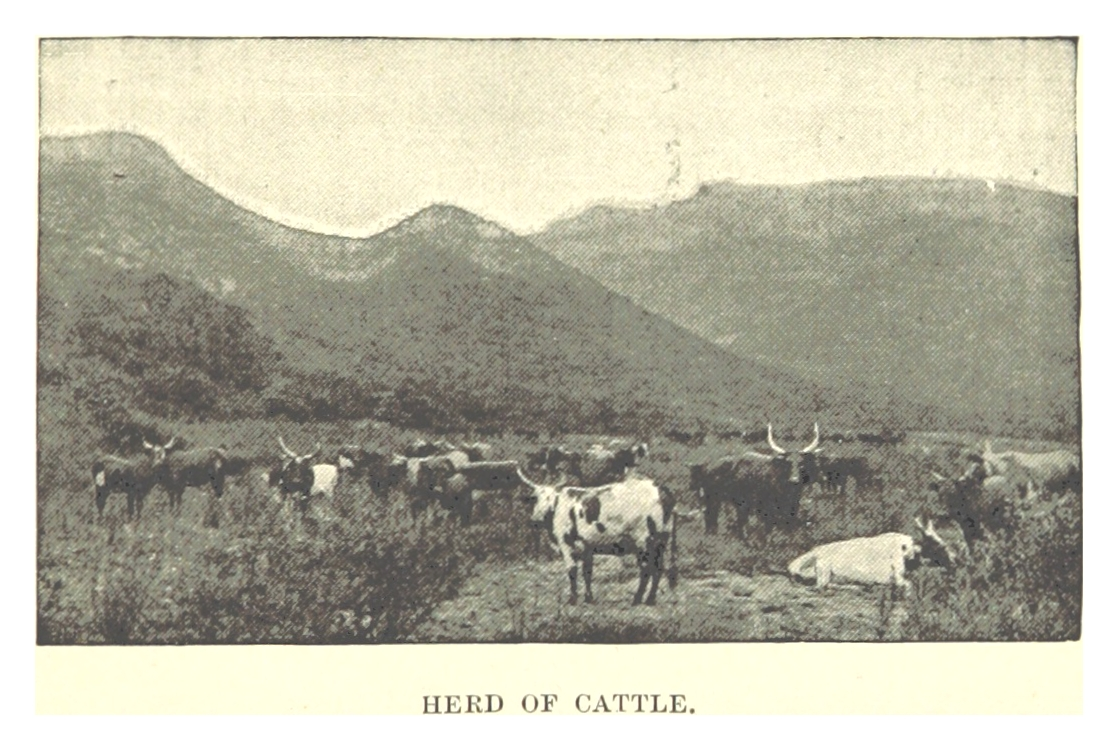
A late 19th-century photograph of Zulu cattle

The official British narrative of the campaign recorded British losses in the action as two NNC men killed and one NNC officer, one NNC non-commissioned officer and at least twelve NNC men wounded. (Note: The British wounded officer was Lieutenant Purvis, shot in the arm, and the NCO Corporal Mayer, shot in the knee. Morris (1965, p. 325) also lists Corporal Ferdinand Schiess as being wounded in the calf by an assegai in this action, but he belonged to the 2nd Battalion held in reserve during the action and is also recorded as being admitted to the hospital at Rorke's Drift (where he fought and won the Victoria Cross) with severe blisters to his foot. Williams (2015, p. 67) gives a figure of 20 NNC wounded.) The British captured 13 horses, 413 cattle, 332 goats and 235 sheep with some of these being driven into Natal. The British soldiers were pleased with this as they anticipated payment of prize money for the livestock. They were left disappointed when the animals were sold to army contractors at a low price.

Chelmsford wrote to Frere:

I am in great hope that the news of the storming of Sihayo's stronghold and the capture of so many of his cattle ... may have the salutary effect in Zululand and either bring down a large force to attack us or else produce a revolution in the country. Sihayo's men have I am told always been looked upon as the bravest in the country and certainly those who were killed today fought with great courage.

The engagement was reported in the Natal Times of 16 January as a victory over a Zulu attack. The newspaper mistakenly reported that one NNC officer was killed and two Natal Mounted Police members killed or wounded. It noted "the prediction of those best acquainted with the Zulus, that they would never stand the fire of regular forces, has been abundantly verified".

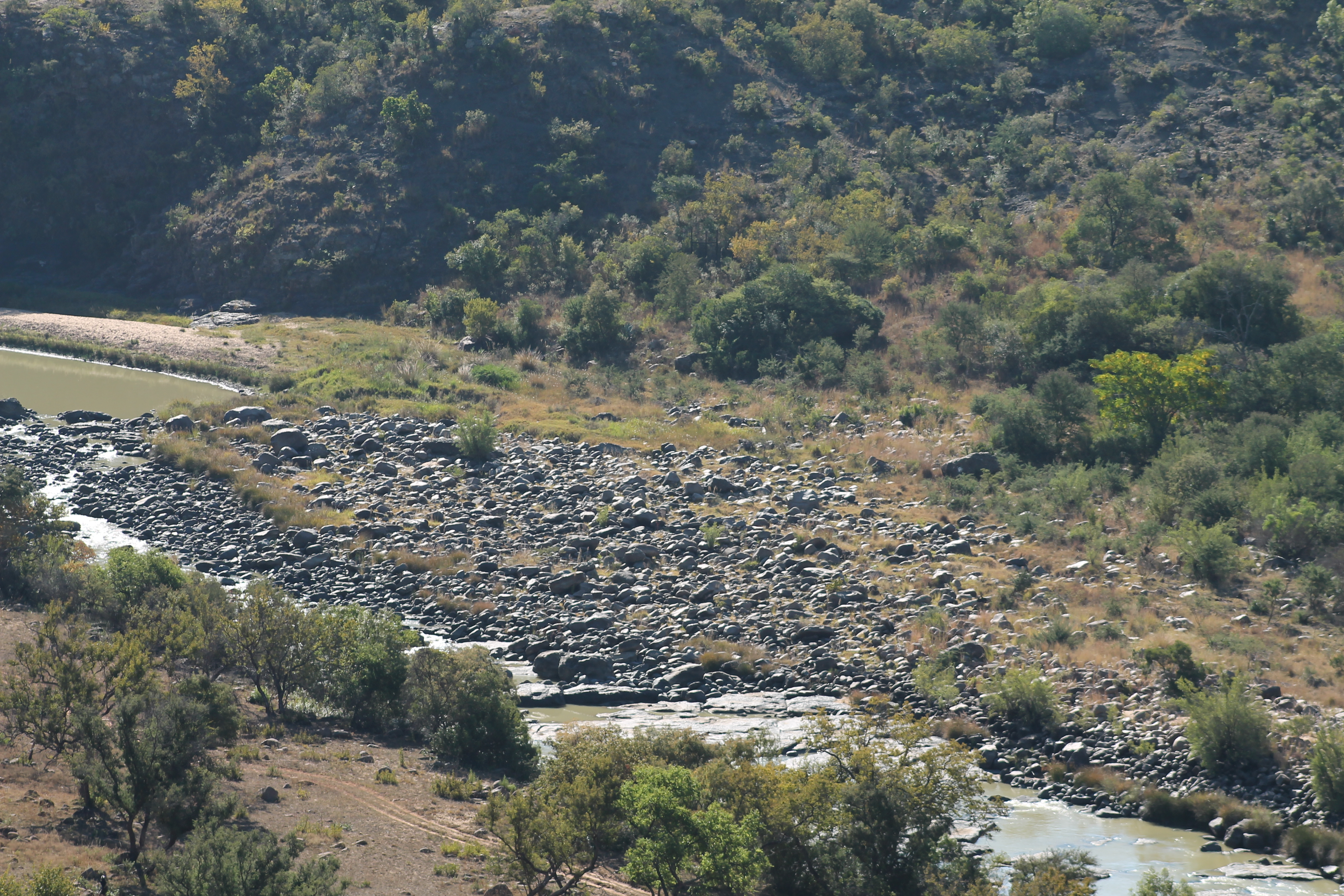
A modern view of Fugitive's Drift

Sihayo and his senior son, Mehlokazulu, missed the action, having left the day before with the bulk of his fighting men to answer Cetshwayo's call to arms at Ulundi. He had left just 200 to 300 men to defend his kraal. News of the attack reached the Zulu king while he was considering which of the three British columns to engage with his main force. The action seems to have convinced him to order an attack on the Centre Column. Cetshwayo may have been persuaded that the Centre Column was the most important of the British forces by the presence of Chelmsford directing the attack. Cetshwayo sent the bulk of his army against it and part of Chelmsford's force was subsequently annihilated at the Battle of Isandlwana on 22 January. The prisoners released by Chelmsford on 13 January may have helped the inhabitants of Sotondose's Drift attack British survivors of the battle. The survivors of Sihayo's kraal were certainly present, harassing the fleeing men and killing stragglers. The dead included Lieutenants Teignmouth Melvill and Nevill Coghill who were killed while trying to save the Queen's colour of the 1/24th and the drift afterwards became known as Fugitive's Drift.

== Interpretation ==
The action at Sihayo's kraal was the first of the war. Anglo-Zulu War historian Adrian Greaves, writing in 2012, regards the action at Sihayo's kraal as a token victory against a small Zulu force consisting of old men and boys. He considers there was no military value to the engagement as Sihayo's warriors had already left the kraal to assemble with the main army and could not threaten Chelmsford's supply lines. Greaves thinks the action may have given Chelmsford false confidence that the Zulu would run from future engagements. Ian Knight considers that Chelmsford took the wrong lesson from the action, rather than noting the determination of the Zulu to hold their ground and the courage of their leaders (Mkumbikazulu having been killed leading his men), he focussed on the ease with which the Zulu had been defeated in a one-sided engagement. Knight thinks this led to a sense of complacency in the column, which may have been a factor in their subsequent defeat at Isandlwana.

The location of the action and Sihayo's kraal is not certain as records kept by the British were vague and no battlefield relics have been recovered. The historian Keith Smith places Sihayo's kraal at Sokhexe, a settlement still occupied by Sihayo's descendants and the earlier action at a location somewhat to the south near Ngedla hill.
