= James Rorke =

Irish settler and trader in southern Africa

James Alfred Rorke (c. 1827 – 24 October 1875) was an Irish settler and trader in southern Africa. He served as a civilian in the British Army commissariat in 1846 during the Seventh Xhosa War. In 1849, Rorke purchased a farmstead in the Colony of Natal, on the border with Zululand near a river crossing that became known as Rorke's Drift and established a trading post. After his death the site of his home played a key role in the 1879 Anglo-Zulu War and was the location of the Battle of Rorke's Drift.

== Early life ==
There are two accounts of Rorke's background. Donald R. Morris, writing in 1965, records that Rorke's father—also named James—was an Irish soldier. Morris states that he arrived at Mossel Bay with an Irish regiment of the British Army in 1821 (there was an influx of British settlers to Southern Africa in this period) and fought against African tribesmen before settling in the Cape Colony, either after his period of enlistment ended or he deserted. Ian Knight, writing in 2008, states that Rorke's father emigrated from Ireland to Southern Africa in 1827 with two of his brothers.

James Alfred Rorke was born in the Eastern Cape in 1827. In 1846 Rorke served as a civilian with the British Army commissariat (supply department) in the Seventh Xhosa War. By the end of that year, he had settled in Durban in the recently established Colony of Natal. In 1847, he started to relocate towards the border with Zululand.

== Rorke's Drift ==
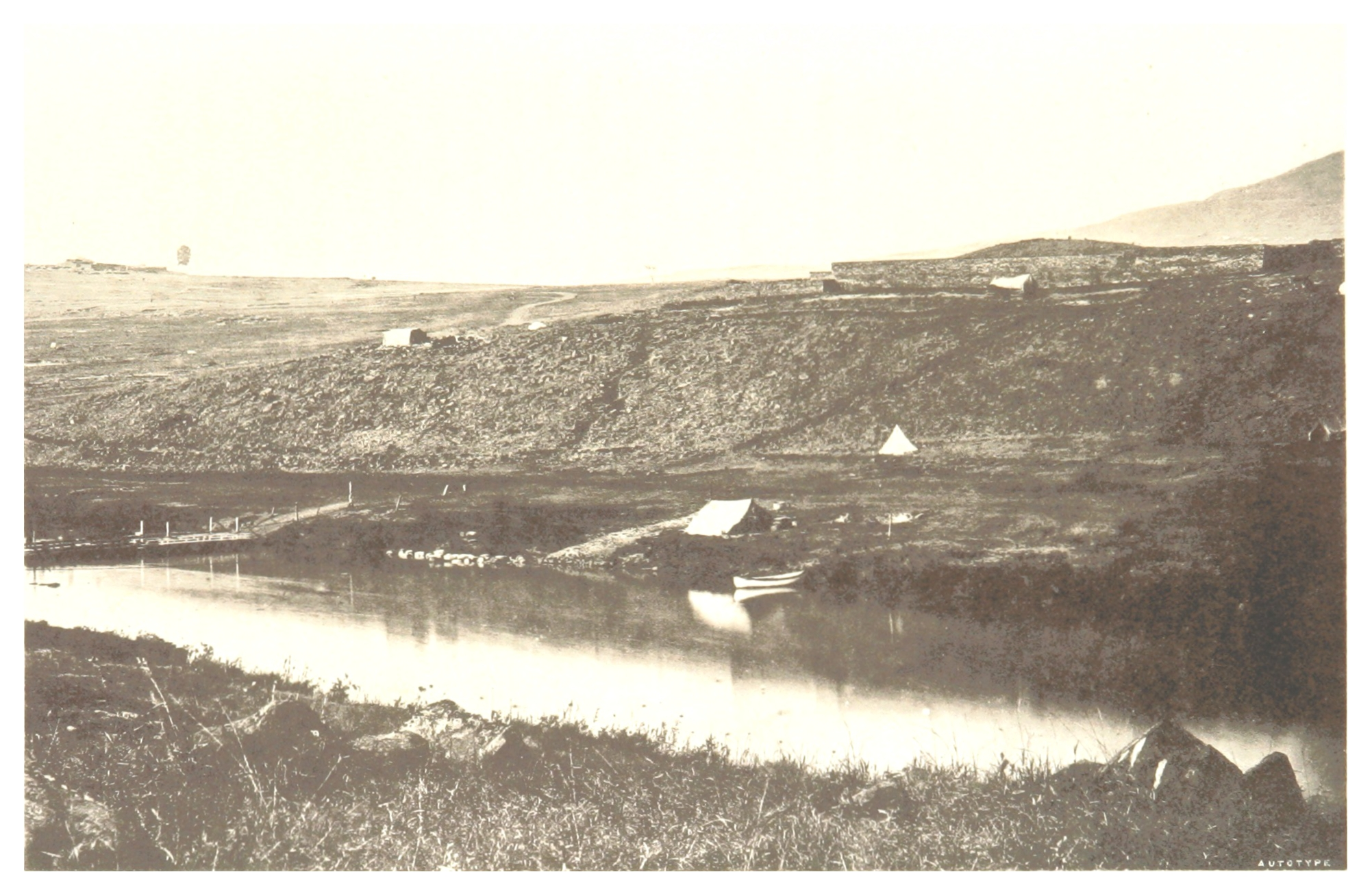
Rorke's Drift photographed in 1882

Rorke purchased a 3,000-acre (1,200-hectare) property on the Zululand border in 1849. His land lay on the southern Natal bank of the Buffalo River; its north bank was Zulu territory. Rorke's land included the only drift for several miles up-or downstream; this came to be known as Rorke's Drift. It also lay on a hunting trail, running from the southwest border to the settlement of Helpmekaar.

Rorke built his home around 0.25 miles (0.40 km) from the drift, on a flat terrace at the foot of the Oscarberg hill. The long, single-storey structure was constructed of locally made brick and stone with thatched roofs. His house was of an unusual layout, Rorke having an aversion to interior doors and to windows. Five of the rooms were accessible only via external doors, the remaining six rooms forming two self-contained suites. Five of the rooms had no windows at all. The front featured a covered veranda that looked out upon Rorke's vegetable garden. He named his house Tyeana, which is a corruption of the Zulu name for Oscarberg, Shiyane. As well as farming his own land, Rorke was also a hunter.

By the end of 1849, Rorke had become a trader. To facilitate his business, he opened a separate store—built in a similar fashion to his house—and a rough stone cattle pen. Rorke also pioneered a road across the drift into Zululand, which became popular with hunters and traders. Through his trading Rorke cultivated good relationships with the Zulu across the border who, struggling with the name Rorke, named his post KwaJimu (meaning "place of Jimu"). He was a good friend of Sihayo kaXongo, the Zulu chief of the territory on the far side of the Buffalo River.

Rorke served as a cornet in the Buffalo Border Guard, a colonial militia unit, and was a border agent for the Natal government, responsible for monitoring the border and reporting any incidents. He was married to Sara Johanna Strydom, the daughter of a local Voortrekker, and had two children, James Michael and Louisa.

== Death and aftermath ==
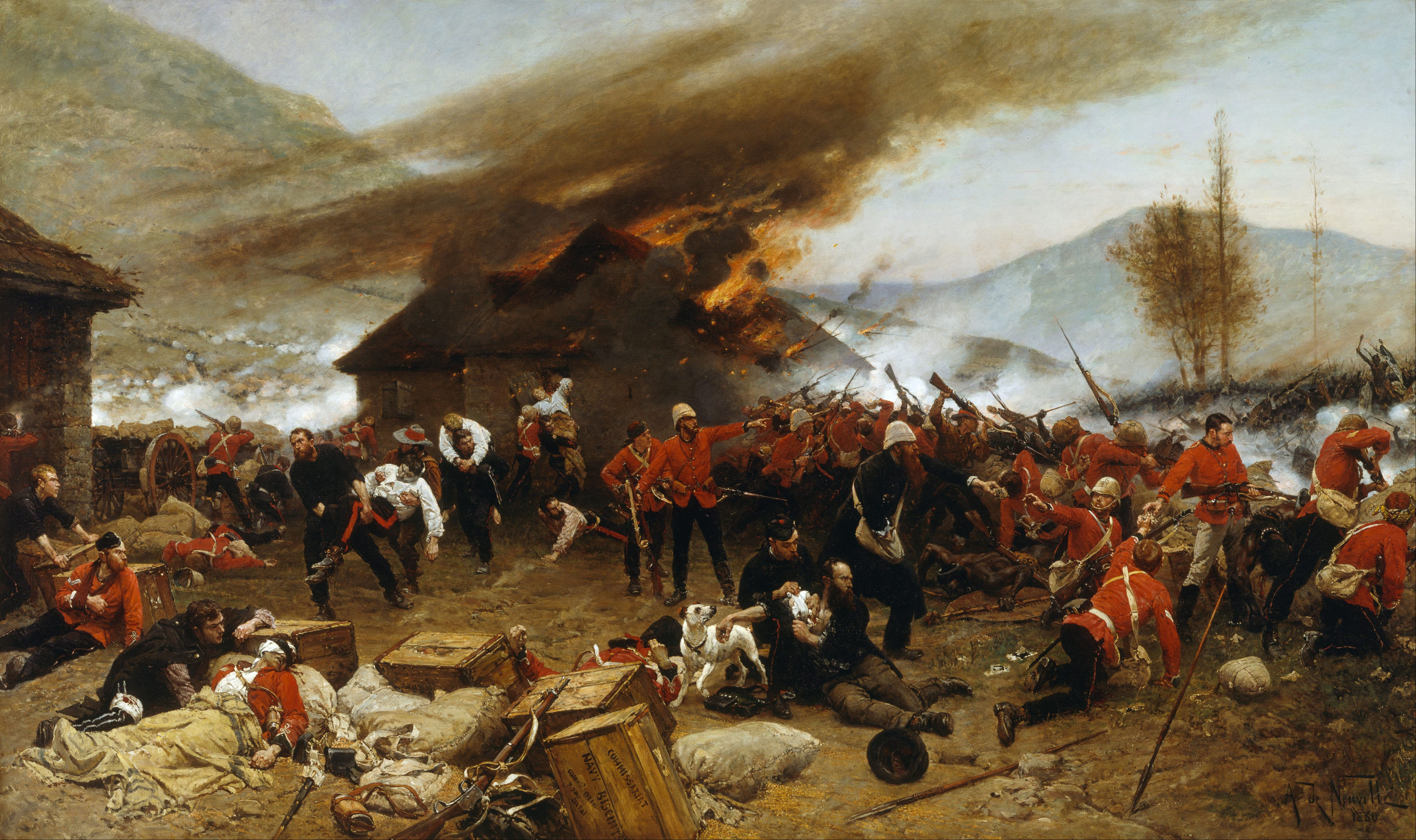
A depiction of the defence of Rorke's Drift. Rorke's former house is on fire.

Rorke committed suicide by gunshot on 24 October 1875, apparently after a consignment of gin from Greytown was lost on the road to his farm. It is not known if the gin was for his personal consumption or part of his trading stock.

Rorke's final wishes were to be buried near his farm under 3 feet (0.9 m) of concrete; this was due to the Zulus having previously dug up European graves in the region, in search of valuable items or body parts for use in their medicine. Because the area was sparsely settled, Rorke's funeral was conducted by a Scottish missionary from Dundee, some 25 miles (40 km) distant and attendees came from up to 40 miles (64 km) away. Rorke's last will and testament was published in 1876 and among his possessions was listed "a Rifle, a Dble [possibly double-barelled] gun and a revolver with cartridges"; however, his wife was left destitute.

Sara Rorke was forced to sell Rorke's homestead to the settler John Surtees, who sold it to a Swedish missionary society in 1878; the society installed Reverend Otto Witt at the post. Witt took over Rorke's house and converted his former store into a church. During the Anglo-Zulu War, the British Army used the house as a hospital and the church as a store; it was the site of the successful improvised defence against a superior Zulu force at the Battle of Rorke's Drift on 22 and 23 January 1879, during which Rorke's house burnt down. The Rorke's Drift site is now a museum and church, and Rorke's grave can be visited.

Rorke's son, James Michael Rorke, became an adviser to the pro-British Zulu chieftain Hamu kaNzibe, half-brother and rival of King Cetshwayo. He settled with Hamu in Zululand after Cetshwayo was deposed following the 1879 war; he married a number of Zulu women and had at least three children before his death in 1934.

== Bibliography ==
- Greaves, Adrian (2005). Crossing the Buffalo: The Zulu War of 1879. London: Cassell. ISBN 978-0-3043-6725-2.
- Greaves, Adrian (2012). Rorke's Drift. Orion. ISBN 978-1-78022-497-8.
- Knight, Ian (2004). The National Army Museum Book of the Zulu War. Pan Books. ISBN 033-0-48629-2.
- Knight, Ian (16 October 2008). Companion to the Anglo-Zulu War. Pen and Sword. ISBN 978-1-4738-1331-1.
- Morris, Donald R. (1965). The Washing of the Spears. Pen and Sword. ISBN 067-1-63108-X.
- David, Saul (2004). Zulu: The Heroism and Tragedy of the Zulu War. London: Penguin. ISBN 978-0-670-91474-6.
