= Richard Glyn =

Richard Glyn may refer to:

- Sir Richard Glyn, 1st Baronet, of Ewell (1711–1773), British banker and MP
- Sir Richard Glyn, 1st Baronet, of Gaunt's House (1755–1838), British banker and MP, son of the above
- Sir Richard Glyn, 9th Baronet (1907–1980), British Conservative politician, descendant of the above
- Richard Thomas Glyn (1831–1900), British Army general

== See also ==
- Glyn baronets
