= Sosobala Mbatha =

South African traditional healer (c.1930–2000)

- Born: Sosobala Esau Mbatha c. 1930; Nquthu, KwaZulu Natal, South Africa
- Died: September 2000 (aged 69–70); KwaZulu Natal, South Africa
- Occupation: Traditional healer
- Children: Makhosi Mbatha (daughter); Ntombi Mbatha (d.2011; daughter)
- Father: Mazinyane Mbatha
- Awards: Honorary Doctorate (University of Zululand)

Sosobala Mbatha (also known as "The Flying Doctor"; c.1930- September 2000), was a South African traditional healer and businessman from Nquthu, KwaZulu Natal.

== Early life and career ==
Sosobala Mbatha was born in Nquthu in KwaZulu Natal. From a young age he became involved in traditional healing, known locally as an 'inyanga'. He learnt the healing powers from his father, Mazinyane Mbatha and grandfather, Ngoqo Mbatha. By his teenage years, he was already practicing indigenous medicine and gained a reputation that attracted patients from various backgrounds across South Africa and beyond in the 1980s. He offered treatments rooted in Zulu indigenous knowledge.

Accounts from media sources also highlight his reputed abilities, including stories of him influencing court outcomes.

In 1991 he bought an aeroplane, unusual for black South Africans or traditional healers at the time and soon bought another plane, a 33-seater DC-3 Dakota and earned the nickname "Flying Doctor".

In the late 1990s, Mbatha was a leading traditional healer in South Africa and amassed wealth for reportedly having herbal cures for HIV/AIDS.

He was best known for his unique personal power, supernatural abilities and public presence, including owning a stately 10-bedroom mansion in rural Nquthu and building a community school.

Accounts from groups in southern Africa indicate that his patients included people from diverse races and professions - ranging from celebrities and politicians to ordinary citizens, and was one of the most sought-after traditional healers in his time.

== Family and legacy ==
Sosobala Mbatha's family has been in the public eye due to his prominence. He reportedly fathered around 40 children with multiple partners.

One of his daughters, Makhosi Mbatha, has helped preserve his legacy through cultural events, including launching a Maskandi music album in 2017 dedicated to him.

His plane's landing strip was near a school he built in the late 1980s called Sihayo Boarding School and built in honour of the 19th-century Zulu chief, Sihayo kaXongo Ngobese.

On 9 October 2011, his daughter, Ntombi Mbatha-Mabizela, shot and killed her husband, Sphiwe Mabizela, at the Dundee Oval Sports Ground before taking her own life. The motive for the incident was not publicly known, and a murder case and inquest were opened pending investigation. At the time, KwaZulu Natal MEC for Transport, Community Safety and Liaison, Willies Mchunu, expressed his condolences to the families and urged people to seek professional or family assistance when dealing with overwhelming problems.
