= Battle of Centane =

Battle of the Ninth Xhosa War

- Part of the Ninth Xhosa War
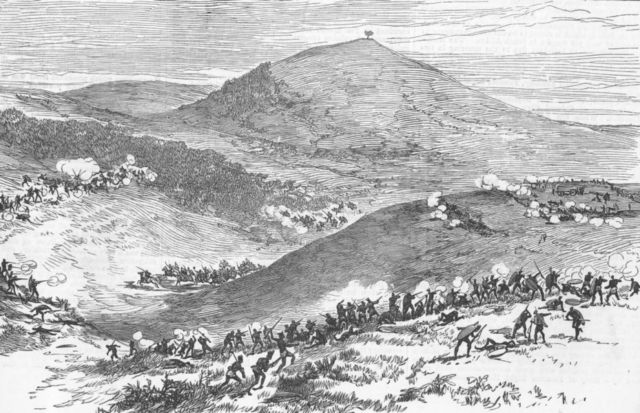
- Battle of Centane (The Illustrated London News, 1878)
Date	7 February 1878
Location	Centane 28.317000°S 32.506870°E
Result	British victory

Belligerents
British Empire	Xhosa Kingdom

Commanders and leaders
Captain Russell Upcher	?

Casualties and losses
10 killed	c. 300 killed
- Location in present-day South Africa

The battle of Centane, also the battle of Kentani or the battle of Quintana, was fought on 7 February 1878 near Kentani ("Centane") in South Africa's Cape Province during the Ninth Xhosa War between 1877 and 1879. A Xhosa forces, composed of Gcalaka and Rharhabe warriors, attacked a British camp in the Centane Mountains and suffered a severe defeat.

== Battle ==
Clash occurred a few weeks after the forces of British General Henry Bartle Frere led a successful campaign against the Gcaleka forces, who joined the Xhosha resistance against the British rule. Bartle's forces, under their commander Veldman Bikitsha, managed to engage and finally defeat the Gcaleka on 13 January (near Nyumaxa).The imperial troops assisted, but were tired, short of rations and unable to follow up on the victory.

At morning of 7 February 1878 a combined force of 1,500 Gcalaka and Rharhabe attacked the British camp near Centane (Kentani) in an attempt to secure food and ammunition. Imperial forces consisting of about 400 British soldiers, mainly consisting of 2 companies of the 1st Battalion 24th Regiment of foot, commanded by Captain Russell Upcher were supported by approximately 560 Fengu warriors and the local Frontier Light Horse militia, who fought mostly unhorsed, led by F. Carrington. A subsequent attack was barely repelled, but outnumbered British were able to defend their posts with very low losses.

About 300 Gcalaka and Rharhabe warriors were killed for the loss of only two British soldiers and 8 Mfengu warriors.

== See also ==
- Xhosa Wars

== Bibliography ==
- Featherstone, Donald (1993). Victorian Colonial Warfare: Africa. United Kingdom: Blandford. ISBN 978-0-7137-2256-7.
- "The Kaffir War". The Illustrated London News. 72: 355. 20 April 1878.
- Philip Gon, The Last Frontier War. The South African Military History Society, Military History Journal, Vol. 5, No 6, December 1982. Online
