= 2020 Centane bus crash =

Road Tragedy

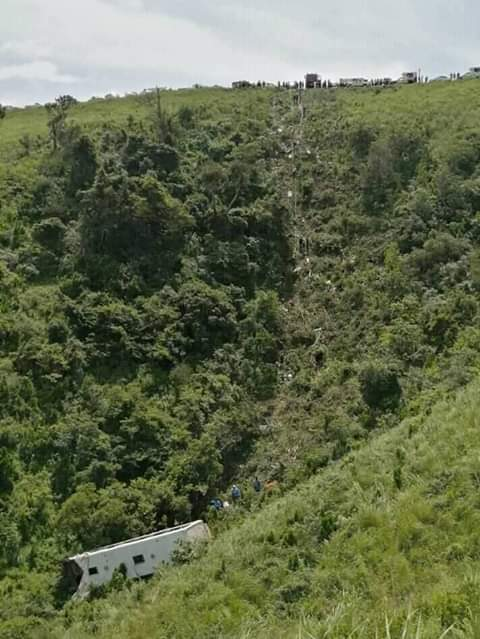
- Accident scene

Details
- Date: 2 March 2020
- Location: Centane, Eastern Cape
- Coordinates: 32°30′25″S 28°19′01″E
- Country: South Africa
- Cause: Excessive speed leading to loss of control

Statistics
- Deaths: 25
- Injured: 62

The 2020 Centane bus crash was a road accident in Centane, Eastern Cape, South Africa that occurred on March 2, 2020. Twenty-five people were killed, and approximately 62 were injured when a 65-seater bus plunged into a deep gorge. The bus had been travelling from the village of Cebe to Butterworth.

According to witness accounts from the survivors, the bus, which was mainly transporting pensioners and young children and was allegedly overloaded, veered off the gravel road and plunged into a deep gorge, killing 25 people, including the driver. The Eastern Cape Transport spokesperson Unathi Binqose said that passengers had complained to the driver about the speed at which he was going. Several injured passengers were airlifted to nearby hospitals.

The accident sent shockwaves across South Africa. The president of the country Cyril Ramaphosa offered his condolences to the families of the victims involved in the accident.

This is a sad day for the people of the Eastern Cape and our nation at large. This tragedy leaves our country deeply saddened and forces us to focus on yet again on the need for transport providers and other road users to exercise care and consideration on our roads.

— Cyril Ramaphosa

The Minister of Transport also offered his condolences.

The loss of so many lives in a single accident is devastating.

— Fikile Mbalula

== Aftermath ==
Ramaphosa promised to improve the infrastructure in Centane.

On 13 March 2020, a mass burial was held for the victims.
