= Frederick Robb =

British Army general

Major-General Sir Frederick Robb KCB KCMG KCVO
- Born: 8 October 1858; London, England
- Died: 8 February 1948 (aged 89); Oxford, Oxfordshire, England
- Military career
- Allegiance: United Kingdom
- Branch: British Army
- Service years: 1880–1919
- Rank: Major-General
- Commands: 11th Infantry Brigade
- Conflicts: Mahdist War; World War I
- Awards: Knight Commander of the Order of the Bath; Knight Commander of the Order of St Michael and St George; Knight Commander of the Royal Victorian Order

Major-General Sir Frederick Spencer Wilson Robb, KCB, KCMG, KCVO (8 October 1858 – 8 February 1948) was a senior British Army officer who went on to be Military Secretary.

== Early life and education ==
Robb was born in St George Hanover Square, London, the son of Capt. John Robb, Naval aide-de-camp to Queen Victoria, and Mary Ann Boulton, daughter of manufacturer Matthew Robinson Boulton. He was educated at Harrow School, Trinity Hall, Cambridge, and the Royal Military College Sandhurst.

== Military career ==
Robb was commissioned into the 68th (Durham) Regiment of Foot (Light Infantry) in August 1880.

He became adjutant of his regiment in 1890 before going on to be a brigade major at Aldershot in 1892. Appointed a staff captain in the intelligence division at army headquarters in 1895, he became Deputy Assistant Adjutant General at Army Headquarters in 1896.

Robb took part in the Nile expedition in 1898, and was then placed on half-pay and promoted to lieutenant colonel on 16 November 1898. In early 1902 he became Assistant Adjutant General at Army Headquarters, with the substantive rank of colonel dated 1 January 1902. For his service in organizing troops during the Coronation of King Edward VII and Queen Alexandra, he was invested as a Member (fourth class) of the Royal Victorian Order (MVO) two days after the ceremony, on 11 August 1902. He was promoted to the temporary rank of brigadier general and appointed commander of the 11th Infantry Brigade, as well as the Colchester Garrison, and was placed in charge of Administration at Aldershot Command in February 1910, taking ovrr from Major General Henry Merrick Lawson. He became Assistant Chief of the Imperial General Staff in 1914.

Robb served in World War I, was promoted to temporary lieutenant general on 5 August 1914, and, after being made military secretary to the secretary of state for war as well as secretary of the selection board in October, was appointed a Knight Commander of the Order of the Bath in February 1915. He served as Military Secretary and was then placed in charge of Administration at Eastern Command in 1916, in succession to Major-General Richard M. Ruck. He was appointed a Knight Commander of the Order of St Michael and St George in June 1919 retired that year.

Robb was also colonel of the Durham Light Infantry from January 1923 to 1928.

Military offices
Preceded by Sir Alfred Codrington	Military Secretary; 1914–1916	Succeeded by Sir Francis Davies
Honorary titles
Preceded by Russell Upcher	Colonel of the Durham Light Infantry; 1923–1928	Succeeded by Sir Beauvoir De Lisle
