= The Washing of the Spears =

1965 book by Donald R. Morris

- Author: Donald R. Morris
- Language: English
- Genre: Non-fiction
- Publication date: 1965

The Washing of the Spears is a 1965 book by Donald R. Morris about the "Zulu Nation under Shaka" and the Anglo-Zulu War of 1879. It chronicles the rise of the Zulu nation under Shaka Zulu in the early 19th century and Chief Cetshwayo’s inevitable war with the British in 1879 as the colony of Natal pushed at the Zulu nation's borders.

Morris worked on the book during a five-year posting in Berlin. The first edition, published in 1965, was over 600 pages with detailed bibliography. The book has been reprinted many times; an edition of the book was published in 1998, with a foreword by Chief Mangosuthu Buthelezi.
