= George Hamilton-Browne =

British irregular soldier (1844–1916)

George Hamilton-Browne (22 December 1844 – 21 January 1916) was a British irregular soldier, adventurer, writer and impostor. He was on a reconnaissance on 22 January 1879, and was not present at the Battle of Isandlwana in the Zulu War of 1879. He wrote three books about his experiences, some details of which have been claimed to be of dubious authenticity.

== Biography ==
He was born into a military family of Irish descent in Cheltenham, Gloucestershire on 22 December 1844. He was the son of George Browne (Capt 44th Regiment) and Susanna Mary Hilton, who were married in Manchester 7 March 1844. He was twice married and died in Jamaica in January 1916.

== Anglo-Zulu War ==
When Natal Native Contingent was formed in November 1879, Hamilton-Browne volunteered to become one of its officers. He first served as a captain, commanding one of the companies of the 1st Battalion/3rd Regiment of the NNC, but on 10 January 1879 was promoted to the commander the entire battalion, after the former commander fell of his horse and injured his head. Each battalion of the NNC had 10 infantry companies of 110 soldiers (9 Europeans and 101 Africans) each, but only 20 men per company had rifles (3 European officers and 6 NCOs with modern Martini-Henrys, and 1 African officer and 10 NCOs with old muzzleloading Enfields), while other 90 had only spears and shields. As commander of the 1st battalion, Hamilton-Browne took part in the battle of Sihayo's Kraal on 12 January 1879, and was sent with most of his battalion on a reconnaissance in force east of the main British camp at Isandlwana on 21 January. His unit was the first to return to the camp in the afternoon of 22 January, and it came four miles from Isandlwana during the final stage of the battle. That way, Hamilton-Browne was able to inspect the final moments of the battle of Isandlwana through his binoculars.

== In popular culture ==
He was portrayed sympathetically in Zulu Dawn (1979), played by British actor Nigel Davenport.

== Literature ==
- Morris, Donald R. (1998). The Washing of the Spears: A History of the Rise of the Zulu Nation Under Shaka and Its Fall in the Zulu War of 1879. Da Capo Press. ISBN 9780747401940.
- Knight, Ian (2003). The Zulu War 1879. Essential Histories 56. Oxford: Osprey Publishing Ltd. ISBN 9781841766126.
- Lock, Ron (2017). The Anglo-Zulu War-Isandlwana: the revelation of a disaster. Barnsley, South Yorkshire: Pen & Sword Military. ISBN 978-1-5267-0742-0. OCLC 991077017.
- Knight, Ian (2013). British infantryman versus Zulu warrior: Anglo-Zulu War, 1879. Combat 3. Oxford: Osprey Pub. ISBN 978-1-78200-365-6.
- Castle, Ian; Ruggeri, Raffaele (2003). Zulu War - Volunteers, Irregulars & Auxiliaries. Men-at-Arms 388. Osperey Publishing Ltd. ISBN 9781841764849.
- Thompson, Paul Singer; Thompson, Paul (2006). Black soldiers of the queen: the Natal native contingent in the Anglo-Zulu War (Rev. ed.). Tuscaloosa, Ala: Univ. of Alabama Press. ISBN 978-0-8173-5368-1.
- Hamilton-Browne, G. (1912). A lost legionary in South Africa. University of California Libraries. London, Laurie.
- Hamilton-Browne, George (2021). Camp Fire Yarns of the Lost Legion. Goodreads.
