= All Hands on Deck (1961 film) =

1961 film

- Original British quad poster
- Directed by: Norman Taurog
- Written by: Jay Sommers
- Based on: Warm Bodies; 1957 novel by Donald R. Morris
- Produced by: Oscar Brodney
- Starring: Pat Boone
- Cinematography: Leo Tover
- Edited by: Fredrick Y. Smith
- Music by: Cyril J. Mockridge
- Production company: Twentieth Century Fox Film Corporation
- Distributed by: 20th Century Fox
- Release date: March 30, 1961
- Running time: 100 minutes
- Country: United States
- Language: English
- Budget: $1,115,000
- Box office: $1,500,000 (US)

All Hands on Deck is a 1961 American DeLuxe musical film in CinemaScope directed by Norman Taurog and starring Pat Boone as a naval officer. It is based on the novel Warm Bodies by Donald R. Morris.

== Plot ==
Lieutenant Donald (Pat Boone) of the US Navy is assigned to look after a troublesome sailor, Garfield (Buddy Hackett), who is from an oil-rich Indian tribe. He also romances journalist Sally Hobson (Barbara Eden).

== Cast ==
- Pat Boone as Lieutenant Victor 'Vic' Donald
- Buddy Hackett as Garfield
- Dennis O'Keefe as Lieutenant Commander O'Gara
- Barbara Eden as Sally Hobson
- Warren Berlinger as Ensign Rush
- Gale Gordon as Admiral Bintle
- David Brandon as Lieutenant Kutley
- Ann B. Davis as Nobby

== Original novel ==
The film was based on a 1957 novel, Warm Bodies, by Donald R. Morris, based on his experiences in the Navy. The New York Times described it as "a delightful book, fresh, warmhearted and full of fun." The Los Angeles Times called it "the best funny novel about the navy since... Mr Roberts".

== Production ==
In 1958, screenwriter Jay Sommers optioned the rights to the novel and wrote a script, which he succeeded in selling to 20th Century Fox as a vehicle for Pat Boone. Part of the deal was that Sommers was kept on as writer; Oscar Brodney was assigned to produce.

It was Pat Boone's first film in a number of months. He had been studying with Sanford Meisner for two years and felt in this film he was finally a "good actor".

Diana Dors was mentioned as a possible co-star, but did not appear in the final film. Jody McCrea made an early appearance.

Filming started 14 November 1960.

It was photographed in CinemaScope and DeLuxe Color.

== Release ==
The studio did not create a pressbook to market the film in the rush to release it. Instead, the studio's marketing of the film centered on interviews with the cast.

Diabolique magazine says, "The racism against native Americans here is both casual and formal, but it's a rare Hollywood film at the time where they are shown to have some status in the modern world... It is all done with high spirits. Boone is quite animated, and it is a relaxed performance, his best to date. The Meisner training did pay off. Director Norman Taurog worked several times with Elvis Presley, and this feels like it could have been a Presley vehicle."

== Songs ==
The film features four songs by Ray Evans and Jay Livingston:

- "All Hands on Deck"
- "Somewhere There's Home"
- "There's No One Like You"
- "I've Got It Made"
