= Sihayo kaXongo =

Zulu chief (c. 1824 – 1883)

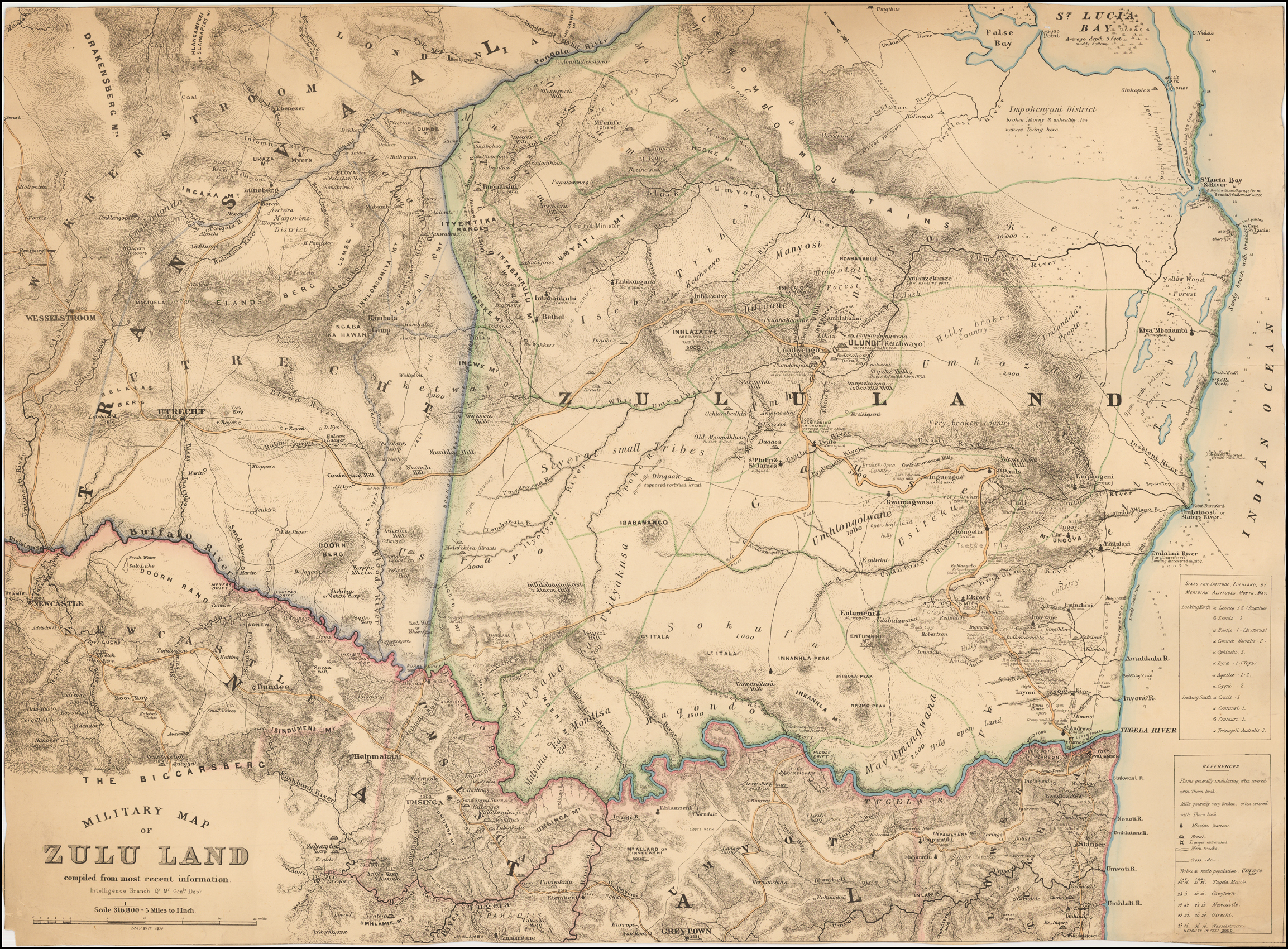
An 1879 map of Zululand. Sihayo's territory (labelled uSirayo) is shown at the southern end of the western border with the South African Republic (the straight blue line), set out by Sihayo and Pretorius. The British estimate of the male population of Sihayo's territory in 1879 is shown as 3,000.

Sihayo kaXongo Ngobese (Note: kaXongo is a patronymic surname and marks Sihayo as the son of Xongo. Ngobese is an Izibongo, a Zulu clan or praise name, and refers to a type of marsh plant.) (c. 1824 – 2 July 1883) was a Zulu inKosi (chief). In some contemporary British documents he is referred to as Sirhayo or Sirayo. He was an inDuna (commander) of the iNdabakawombe iButho (social age group and regiment) and supported Cetshwayo in the 1856 Zulu Civil War. Under Cetshwayo, Sihayo was a chief of a key territory on the border with the British Colony of Natal and had a seat on the iBandla (royal council). Sihayo was an Anglophile who wore European clothes and maintained friendly relations with trader James Rorke who lived nearby at Rorke's Drift. By 1864, Sihayo was head of the Qungebeni tribe and that year agreed a new western border of the kingdom with Boer leader Marthinus Wessel Pretorius.

In 1878 two of Sihayo's wives were found to be cheating, were attacked by Sihayo's family, and fled to Natal. Sihayo's sons and brother launched a cross-border raid which captured and executed them. The British authorities objected and demanded Sihayo's family be handed over to face British justice. Cetshwayo refused and the incident became a casus belli of the 1879 Anglo-Zulu War. Sihayo's kraal was attacked on 12 January and one of his sons killed. Sihayo had taken most of his men to Ulundi to join the royal army. The Zulu defeated the British at the Battle of Isandlwana, which some of Sihayo's men participated in, but lost the war in July. The Zulu kingdom was broken up after the war and Sihayo lost his land. Sihayo was killed in July 1883 when Ulundi was overrun by the forces of Zibhebhu kaMaphitha during the Third Zulu Civil War.

== Early life ==
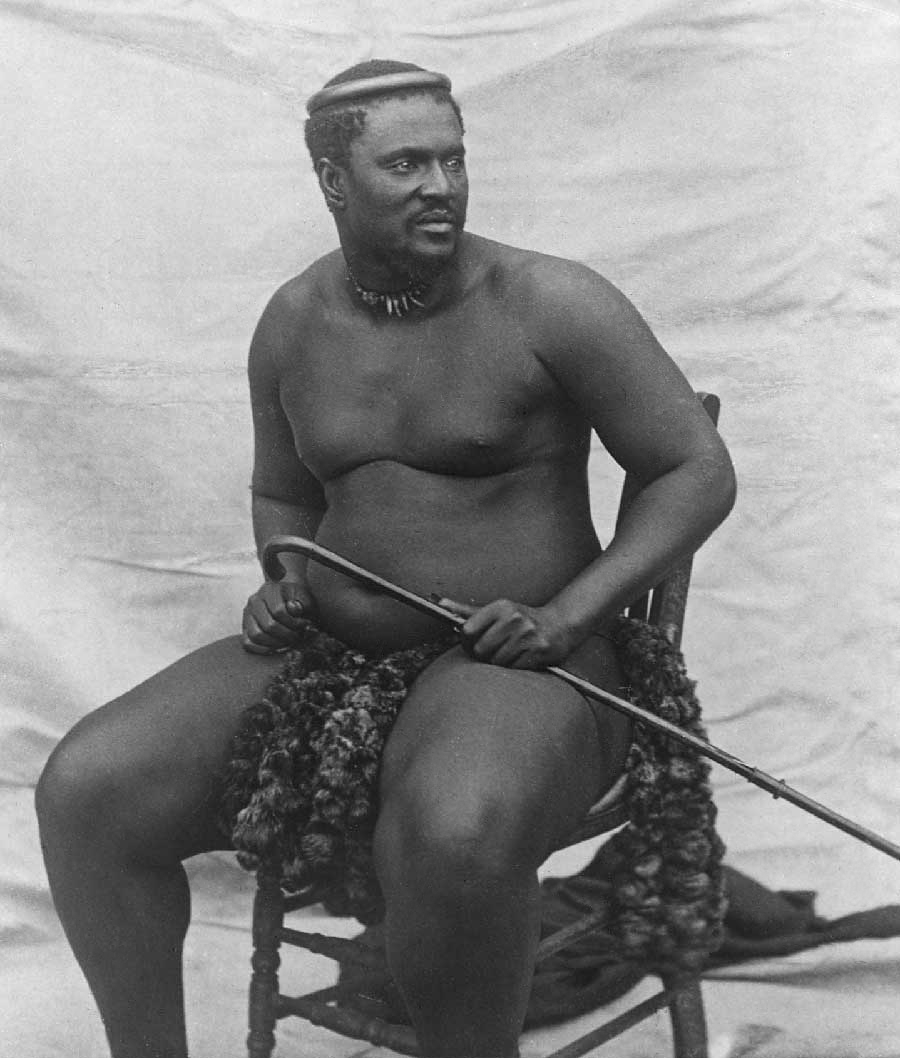
Cetshwayo, photographed in 1875

Sihayo was the son of Xongo, a descendent of the junior branch of the rulers of the Qungebeni people. The Qungebeni lived to the west of the homeland of the Zulu people but at the start of the reign of Zulu King Shaka (1816–1828) were absorbed into the kingdom. The principal branch of the Qungebeni rulers was ended by Shaka or his successor Dingane but the junior branch were elevated to become Zulu officials. Years of birth for Zulu of this period are often unknown but can be estimated from their iButho, a grouping of similarly aged men that also functioned as a regiment in times of war; South African historian John Laband estimates Sihayo's year of birth as 1824.

By 1850 Xongo was an InDuna (chief) for Dingane's successor Mpande with responsibility for a part of the western border with the British Colony of Natal. This area was also subject to encroachment by the Boers who established the South African Republic in 1852. A number of the Qungebeni joined Xongo to settle in his new territory. Xongo's death triggered a dispute between Sihayo and his elder brother Mfokazana as to who should succeed to the chiefdom. Sihayo supported Mpande's eldest son, Cetshwayo, in his 1856 succession dispute with his brother, Mpande's favourite son, Mbuyazi. Cetshwayo established himself as the heir apparent after defeating and killing Mbuyazi at the Battle of Ndondakusuka. Cetshwayo afterwards seized de facto control of the kingdom, though his father remained nominal king until his death in October 1872.

Afterwards Sihayo enjoyed a close relationship with Cetshwayo; he sat on his iBandla (royal council) and was an inDuna of the iNdabakawombe iButho. After Mfokazana's death Cetshwayo confirmed Sihayo as successor to Xongo's chiefdom. He made his homestead kwaSoxhege (Zulu:"the maze", but known to contemporary English speakers as "Sihayo's kraal") in the northern part of the Ngedla mountain overlooking the Mbhashe River valley and commanding the road from Natal into Zululand across Rorke's Drift. The drift was named after the Irish trader Jim Rorke who had made his home there and was a friend of Sihayo. Sihayo was an Anglophile who wore European clothes rather than traditional Zulu dress and owned several horses and wagons. He also possessed two high-quality, English-made shotguns and was reported to be a good shot at hunting. The Mbhashe valley was very fertile and Sihayo operated several farms, utilising European-made ploughs.

In 1864 Sihayo was confirmed as head of the Qungebeni and granted additional territories adjoining those he already possessed; this also brought his fighting force up to around 300 men. Also in 1864 Sihayo met with Boer leader Marthinus Wessel Pretorius to delineate the kingdom's western border with the South African Republic, which had previously been undefined and disputed. The two men jointly erected stone cairns to mark the line.

== 1878 border incident ==
In July 1878 Sihayo was attending the court of Cetshwayo at the Zulu capital, Ulundi, when his son, Mehlokazulu, discovered that Sihayo's Great Wife (and Mehlokazulu's mother) Kaqwelebana and one of Sihayo's junior wives were having affairs with younger lovers. Mehlokazulu conferred with his uncle, Sihayo's brother Zuluhlenga, and three brothers (Bhekuzulu, Nkumbikazulu and Tshekwane) who decided that Kaqwelebana should be executed as was customary in Zulu law for this offence. Led by Mehlokazulu they attacked Kaqwelebana's hut and she was wounded, but escaped with the junior wife to Natal.

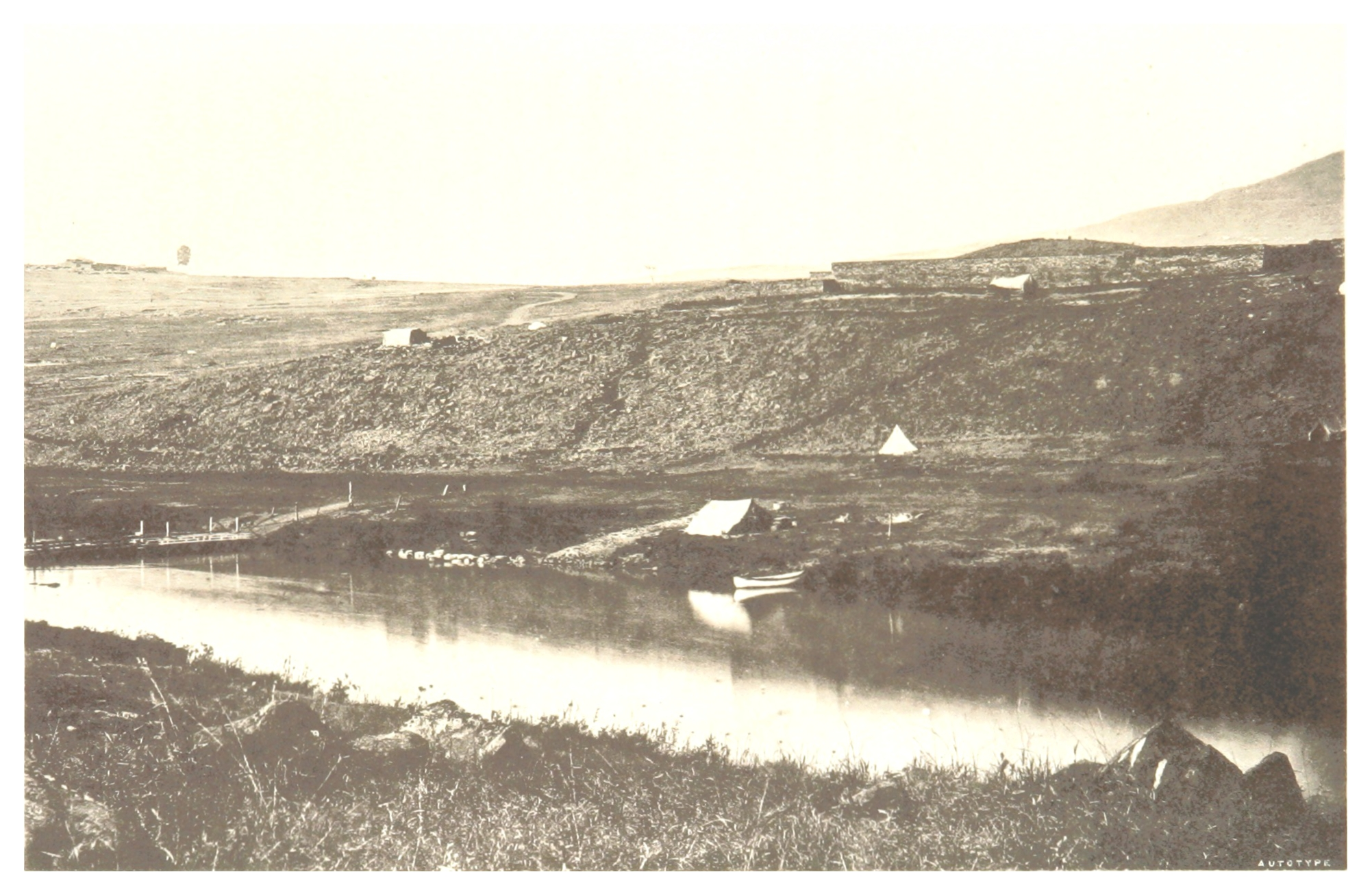
The crossing of the Buffalo River at Rorke's Drift

Sihayo's wives and their lovers sought refuge in the kraals of two Natal border guards. The colonial authorities had long permitted Zulu refugees to settle in Natal but, until 1875, fleeing wives were regarded as chattels and returned to their husbands. The Zulu had crossed into Natal in 1877 to capture a female refugee and the lieutenant-governor of Natal, Henry Ernest Gascoyne Bulwer, had complained to Cetshwayo. The British frequently crossed the border in the other direction in pursuit of fugitives and on at least one occasion Cetshwayo had delivered up such men to the British. Mehlokazulu therefore considered that there would be no serious repercussions if he crossed the border to capture the women. Mehlokazulu, and others in Sihayo's household, crossed the border and seized the junior wife, dragged her back to Zululand and killed her. A week later some eighty of Sihayo's men, led by the five male family members, did the same to Kaqwelebana, killing her on the Zulu bank of the Buffalo, within sight of Rorke's Drift which had become a Swedish missionary post. In neither case were the women's male lovers or the border guards harmed.

When Bulwer learnt of the cross-border incident he complained to Cetshwayo but did not hold him responsible and demanded that Sihayo's sons be handed over to face justice in Natal.

I have sent a message to the Zulu King to inform him of this act of violence and outrage by his subjects in Natal territory, and to request him to deliver Up to this Government to be tried for their offence, under the laws of the Colony, the persons of Mehlokazulu and Bekuzulu the two sons of Sirayo who were the leaders of the party.

Cetshwayo also treated the complaint rather lightly, responding

Cetywayo is sorry to have to acknowledge that the message brought by Umlungi is true, but he begs his Excellency will not take it in the light he sees the Natal Government seem to do, as what Sirayo's sons did he can only attribute to a rash act of boys who in the zeal for their father's house did not think of what they were doing. Cetywayo acknowledges that they deserve punishing, and he sends some of his izinduna, who will follow Umlungi with his words. Cetywayo states that no acts of his subjects will make him quarrel with his fathers of the house of Shaka.

Cetshwayo was of the opinion that the women were guilty under Zulu law and had not been killed on Natal soil so there was no case to answer. Cetshwayo offered payment of £50, likely all the British money he possessed, as a fine which was rejected by Bulwer. Bulwer was considering levying a fine of 5,000 cattle but British High Commissioner for Southern Africa Sir Henry Bartle Frere determined that the incident was a major transgression and could serve as a casus belli for his long-planned invasion and annexation of Zululand. The surrender of Sihayo's brother and sons was one part of Frere's November 1878 ultimatum to the Zulu.

The ultimatum was harsh, demanding radical change in the Zulu way of life and social system as well as demanding Sihayo's family face British justice; it was intended by Frere that Cetshwayo would reject it. Cetshwayo was of the opinion that to hand over Sihayo's relations would have affected his standing as king since Sihayo was his personal representative on the Natal border. He was also reluctant to hand over Mehlokazulu, who was a royal favourite. Mehlokazulu was also an iNduna in the iNgobamakhosi, the king's favourite iButho, and to hand him over would have insulted the regiment. Some of the king's iBandla thought he should consent to the British demand for members of Sihayo's family, believing it would placate the British. Sihayo was criticised by some iBandla members who blamed him for bringing the kingdom into conflict with the British.

== Anglo-Zulu War ==
A depiction of Chelmsford observing the action at Sihayo's Kraal

No response was received to the ultimatum and on 11 January 1879 British forces, under Lord Chelmsford invaded Zululand in three columns, starting the Anglo-Zulu War. Sihayo had been gathering cattle to pay the anticipated fine and a large herd were captured by the British centre column, led by Chelmsford which crossed into Zululand at Rorke's Drift. On 12 January Chelmsford sent a force to attack Sihayo's kraal to secure the left flank of his advance and in retribution for the border transgression. Sihayo had left his kraal to assemble with Cetshwayo's army at Ulundi, leaving around 200–300 warriors under Mkumbikazulu. The British defeated Sihayo's men and burnt his kraal, also killing Mkumbikazulu. The survivors from this battle fled to Sotondose's Drift where, on 22 January, they helped kill British troops fleeing from their defeat at the Battle of Isandlwana.

Sihayo seems to have remained out of battle during the war but, together with Mehlokazulu, accompanied the army on its march to Isandlwana. Sihayo's scouts were the only mounted troops in the army. His brother Gamdana decided to submit to the British and met with Chelmsford at Isandlwana on 21 January, the day prior to British defeat. Sihayo's son Tshekwane was killed by a party of mounted men from the 80th Regiment of Foot (Staffordshire Volunteers), operating from the western column in the days following the battles of Hlobane and Khambula in late March 1879. The war ended with the defeat of the Zulu by Chelmsford at the 4 July Battle of Ulundi, which Sihayo watched from a nearby hill.

== Post-war ==
In August, immediately after the end of the war, Cetshwayo's senior chief Mnyamana kaNgqengelele confiscated all of Sihayo's cattle, as he blamed him for starting the war. As cattle was the basis of wealth in the kingdom Sihayo was left impoverished. As part of the peace terms the British imposed the division of Zululand into 13 chiefdoms, the abolition of the iButho system and the exile of Cetshwayo. The two chiefdoms on the Natal border were granted to Hlubi, a Basuto chief who had fought on the British side, in the west and John Robert Dunn, a British settler who had held territory in pre-war Zululand, in the east. Sihayo's lands fell in Hlubi's chiefdom and in the particular domain of a sub-chief Faku, also a Basuto. Faku ordered Sihayo and Mehlokazulu to leave his territory and Sihayo was left landless.

Sihayo continued to support the royalist uSuthu faction, which campaigned for the return of Cetshwayo. There was sporadic violence between the uSuthu and the new chiefs and the British recognised that the partition had not worked. Cetshwayo was permitted to return but was granted authority over only nine of the chiefdoms in the centre of Zululand. He was left surrounded by the territories of pro-British chiefs to the north and a Zulu Reserve Territory (formed from Hlubi and Dunn's chiefdoms) to the south. This only served to intensify the conflict into the Third Zulu Civil War in 1883. Following the second partition Sihayo had sought refuge in the eastern portion of the Zulu Reserve Territory with the remaining Qungebeni. They were attacked there by Hlubi's Tlokwa.

The uSuthu invaded the chiefdom of the pro-British Zibhebhu kaMaphitha but were routed by an assault by the Mandlakazi, who then counter-attacked Ulundi. Sihayo had rallied to Cetshwayo at the capital and was there when it was taken by the Mandlakazi in July 1883. He was killed in a hut on 2 July, as were 50 other royalist chiefs and izinDuna. Cetshwayo died in exile and the former kingdom was formally annexed by the British in 1887.

== Sources ==
- Colenso, Frances E. (1880). History of the Zulu War and Its Origin. Assisted by Edward Durnford. London: Chapman & Hall.
- David, Saul (2004). Zulu: The Heroism and Tragedy of the Zulu War. London: Penguin. ISBN 978-0-670-91474-6.
- Gleason, Judith Illsley (1980). Leaf and Bone: African-praise Poems. New York: Viking Press. ISBN 0-670-42178-2.
- Greaves, Adrian (2005). Crossing the Buffalo: The Zulu War of 1879. London: Cassell. ISBN 978-0-3043-6725-2.
- Greaves, Adrian (2012a). Rorke's Drift. Orion. ISBN 978-1-78022-497-8.
- Greaves, Adrian (2012b). Forgotten Battles of the Zulu War. Barnsley, South Yorkshire: Pen & Sword. ISBN 978-1-84884-746-0.
- Greaves, Adrian; Knight, Ian (2007). Who's Who in the Zulu War 1879 : Volume II Colonials & Zulus. Barnsley, South Yorkshire: Pen & Sword. ISBN 1-84415-526-9.
- Knight, Ian (1992). Zulu: Isandlwana and Rorke's Drift 22nd – 23rd January 1879. Windrow & Greene. ISBN 978-1-872004-23-5.
- Knight, Ian (2004). The National Army Museum Book of the Zulu War. Pan Books. ISBN 033-0-48629-2.
- Koopman, Adrian (2002). Zulu Names. Pietermaritzburg: University of Natal Press. ISBN 1-86914-003-6.
- Laband, John (2009). Historical Dictionary of the Zulu Wars. Scarecrow Press. ISBN 978-0-8108-6300-2.
- Morris, Donald R. (1965). The Washing of the Spears. Pen and Sword. ISBN 067-1-63108-X.
- Paulin, Christopher M. (2001). White Men's Dreams, Black Men's Blood: African Labor and British Expansionism in Southern Africa, 1877–1895. Africa World Press. ISBN 978-0-86543-929-0.
- Smith, Keith (2014). Dead Was Everything: Studies in the Anglo-Zulu War. Frontline Books. ISBN 978-1-4738-3723-2.
