= Russell Upcher =

British Army general

Major-General Russell Upcher CB DSO
- Born: 3 February 1844
- Died: 1937 (aged 92–93)
- Military career
- Allegiance: United Kingdom
- Branch: British Army
- Service years: 1862–1902
- Rank: Major-General
- Commands: 1st Bn 24th Regiment of Foot; 5th and 68th Regimental Districts
- Conflicts: 9th Xhosa War; Anglo-Zulu War
- Awards: Companion of the Order of the Bath; Distinguished Service Order

Major-General Russell Upcher CB DSO (3 February 1844 – 1937) was a British Army officer who served as colonel of the Durham Light Infantry.

== Military career ==
Educated at Harrow School, Upcher was commissioned as an ensign in the 67th Regiment of Foot on 21 November 1862. He commanded the British troops at the Battle of Quintana in February 1878 during the 9th Xhosa War and commanded the 1st Battalion of the 24th Regiment of Foot in the aftermath of the Battle of Isandlwana in January 1879 during the Anglo-Zulu War. He also served in the Third Anglo-Burmese War in 1885 before becoming General Officer Commanding the 5th and 68th Regimental Districts and then retiring on 3 September 1902. He was also colonel of the Durham Light Infantry.

Honorary titles
Preceded by Sir Reginald Gipps	Colonel of the Durham Light Infantry; 1908–1923	Succeeded by Sir Frederick Robb
