= Centane =

Place in Eastern Cape

Centane Kentani (Anglicised)
- Location within Eastern Cape Location within South Africa Location within Africa
- Coordinates: 32°30′25″S 28°19′01″E
- Country: South Africa
- Province: Eastern Cape
- District: Amathole
- Municipality: Mnquma

Area
  - Total: 4.39 km^{2} (1.69 sq mi)

Population (2011)
  - Total: 1,456
  - Density: 332/km^{2} (859/sq mi)

Racial makeup (2011)
  - Black African: 96.2%
  - Coloured: 0.8%
  - Indian/Asian: 0.2%
  - White: 1.1%
  - Other: 1.7%

First languages (2011)
  - Xhosa: 93.2%
  - English: 1.7%
  - Other: 5.1%
- Time zone: UTC+2 (SAST)
- Area code: 4980

Centane, or alternatively anglicised Kentane or Kentani because Europeans often cannot easily pronounce the Xhosa click 'C'; is a settlement in Amathole District Municipality in the Eastern Cape province of South Africa. It is situated at approximately 31 kilometres (19 mi) from Butterworth.

== History ==
Centane was the site of the battle of Centane on 7 February 1878 during the ninth Frontier War or 'Imfazwe ka Ngcayechibi', where more than 300 Xhosa warriors were killed for the loss of only two British soldiers and 8 Mfengu warriors.

The grave of the Xhosa king, Khawuta kaGcaleka (the father of Bhurhu kaKhawuta and Hintsa kaKhawuta) is in this town in the village of Njingini. The Reverend Tiyo Soga's grave, a Xhosa man from the amaJwarha clan of the Xhosa nation; who was the first black South African to be ordained overseas in Britain and worked to translate the Bible and John Bunyan's classic work Pilgrim's Progress into his native Xhosa language is here in Centane. Soga was allowed by the amaXhosa King Sarhili to build a church in Thuthurha, and at the time of death in 1871; Soga had made a tremendous contribution in converting the local Gcaleka people by preaching and teaching the word of God.

Nongqawuse the little girl who gave a false prophecy in 1855 about the resurrection of all the Xhosa heroes who had died in the Xhosa-British wars, was also born in Centane, in the village of Gxarha near the Qolorha By Sea coast. Nongqawuse's false prophecy led to the entire Xhosa nation slaughtering their own cattle and destroying their crops and food believing that there would be resurrection in 7 days as Nongqawuse had prophecised. When her prophecy did not come true, the British authorities (Sir George Grey) snatched her away and sent her to "safety" in Alexandria (Mnyameni) where she remained until she died. This led to the popular belief that, Nongqawuse had been working with the British to help bring the Xhosa nation to its knees by starving them as the British had utterly failed to defeat AmaXhosa in war for 77 years as of 1856.

== Tourism ==
There are a number of beaches in Centane, including Qolorha By Sea, Mazzepa Bay and Wavecrest.

== See also ==
- 2020 Centane bus crash
