= Natal–Zululand border incident =

1878 incident

Coordinates: 28°54′00″S 31°01′39″E

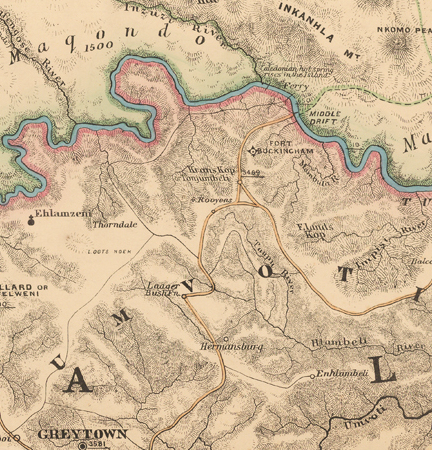
Greytown (lower left) and Fort Buckingham (upper centre), the connecting road, and the Tugela River on an 1879 British map

On 17 September 1878, a British surveyor for the Colony of Natal and a trader were detained by the Zulu while on an island in the Tugela River, which marked the boundary between Natal and Zululand. The men were robbed but released unharmed. The border incident was seized upon by Sir Henry Bartle Frere, the British high commissioner for Southern Africa, as a pretext for war with the Zulu, and reparations for the incident formed part of his December 1878 ultimatum to the Zulu king Cetshwayo. British forces invaded Zululand on 11 January 1879, following the expiry of the ultimatum.

== Incident ==
A fortification, Fort Buckingham, had been established by the British Colony of Natal near to the Middle Drift (crossing) on the Tugela River, which marked the boundary with Zululand. The governor of Natal in 1875, Sir Garnet Wolseley, had ordered the construction of a road to connect the fort and Middle Drift to the settlement of Greytown to the south-west. By 1878, Sir Henry Bartle Frere, the British high commissioner for Southern Africa, had determined to annex the Zulu Kingdom, which he viewed as a threat to peace and to his plan to form a confederation of British territories in the region. British lieutenant general Frederic Thesiger was appointed military commander to the region in 1878 and, anticipating a war, ordered an inspection of the border region.

As part of the inspection it was decided to survey the condition of the road between Greytown and Fort Buckingham. This provided access to the Middle Drift which was a potential route for British forces to cross into Zululand. David Smith of the Natal Colonial Engineers Department was ordered to survey the road, but was ordered to do so without a military escort because troops on the border had previously raised tensions with the Zulu. Smith proceeded in his task, accompanied only by a trader named W. H. Deighton.

On 17 September 1878, the pair were inspecting that part of the road closest to the Middle Drift. A party of Zulu warriors were present on the far bank of the Tugela, posted to provide warning of any British crossings. The Zulu called across to Smith and Deighton but the men ignored them. Smith and Deighton crossed the Middle Drift from the Natal bank to an island close to the Zulu shore to survey the crossing. The water level was low, and the island was separated from the Zulu bank only by a stretch of very shallow water.

The Zulu warriors possibly feared that the men were preparing the route for a British invasion and crossed to the island, which they had long considered to be part of Zulu territory. Smith and Deighton were detained by the Zulu for around an hour. The men were made to turn out their pockets, after which their smoking pipes and handkerchiefs were stolen. Their horses were also confiscated, but these were returned when a passing Zulu inDuna (commander) ordered the warriors to release Smith and Deighton. The men were not injured during the incident.

Sir Bartle Frere described this matter in a despatch to Sir Michael Hicks Beach, who had replaced Carnarvon as Secretary of State for the Colonies:

Mr. Smith, a surveyor in the Colonial Engineer Department, was on duty inspecting the road down to the Tugela, near Fort Buckingham, which had been made a few years ago by order of Sir Garnet Wolseley, and accompanied by Mr. Deighton, a trader, resident at Fort Buckingham, went down to the ford across the Tugela. The stream was very low, and ran under the Zulu bank, but they were on this side of it, and had not crossed when they were surrounded by a body of 15 or 20 armed Zulus, made prisoners, and taken off with their horses, which were on the Natal side of the river, and roughly treated and threatened for some time; though, ultimately, at the instance of a headman who came up, they were released and allowed to depart.

== Aftermath ==
Smith apparently deemed the incident minor in nature and did not report it to his superiors. However, Deighton did report the incident. The governor of Natal, Sir Henry Ernest Gascoyne Bulwer, regarded it as a minor affair, one expected to occur on a border between a European power and a tribal people. Frere initially agreed with this assessment, writing: "I concur with you in attributing no special importance to the seizure and temporary arrest of the surveyors, which was partly due to their own indiscretion, and was evidently in no way sanctioned by the Zulu authorities."

However, Frere later seized on the incident as evidence for the threat posed by the Zulu to Natal. When it became public knowledge the incident caused outrage among the settlers in Natal. Frere demanded reparations for the incident in his 11 December ultimatum to Cetshwayo. Among the first items listed in the ultimatum was a demand for 100 cattle, to be provided within 20 days, as compensation for the offence against Smith and Deighton. The remainder of the ultimatum included more onerous demands that amounted to the effective dismantling of the Zulu social and military system. Frere drew up the ultimatum in the expectation that Cetshwayo would reject it and allow Frere to begin hostilities with the view to annexing Zululand. The ultimatum expired on 11 January 1879 and British forces invaded Zululand, beginning the Anglo-Zulu War that eventually saw the defeat of the Zulu.

== Bibliography ==
- Greaves, Adrian (2005). Crossing the Buffalo: The Zulu War of 1879. London: Cassell. ISBN 978-0-3043-6725-2.
- Knight, Ian (2000). The Anglo-Zulu War, 1879. Archival Publications International. ISBN 978-1-903008-00-3.
- Knight, Ian (2008). Companion to the Anglo-Zulu War. Pen and Sword. ISBN 978-1-84415-801-0.
- Laband, John (2009). Historical Dictionary of the Zulu Wars. Scarecrow Press. ISBN 978-0-8108-6300-2.
- Morris, Donald R. (1965). The Washing of the Spears. Pen and Sword. ISBN 067-1-63108-X.
- Nicolaides, Angelo (2002). An Assessment of the Roles of Frere and Cetshwayo in British Hegemonistic Ambitions in Southern Africa Which Led to the Destruction and Fragmentation of the Zulu State by the Anglo-Zulu War of 1879 (D.Phil. thesis). University of Zululand. p. 121.
- Paulin, Christopher M. (2001). White Men's Dreams, Black Men's Blood: African Labor and British Expansionism in Southern Africa, 1877–1895. Africa World Press. ISBN 978-0-86543-929-0.
