= Francis Clery =

British Army general (1838–1926)

Major-General Sir Francis Clery KCB KCMG
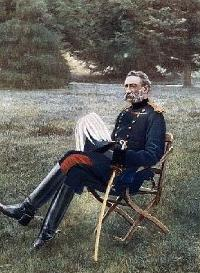
- Born: 13 February 1838; Cork, Ireland
- Died: 25 June 1926 (aged 88)
- Military career
- Allegiance: United Kingdom
- Branch: British Army
- Service years: 1858–1901
- Rank: Major-General
- Unit: 32nd Regiment
- Commands: 2nd Division; Staff College, Camberley
- Conflicts: Anglo-Zulu War; Anglo-Egyptian War; Mahdist War; Second Boer War
- Awards: Knight Commander of the Order of the Bath; Knight Commander of the Order of St Michael and St George

Major-General Sir Cornelius Francis Clery, KCB, KCMG (13 February 1838 – 25 June 1926) was a British Army officer who took part in the Anglo-Zulu War and later commanded the 2nd Division during the Second Boer War.

== Early life ==
Cornelius Frances Clery was born in 2 Sidney Place, Cork, Ireland on 13 February 1838. He was educated at Clongowes Wood College in County Kildare.

== Military career ==
Clery was commissioned as an ensign into the 32nd Regiment of Foot in 1858. He was promoted to lieutenant in 1859 and captain in 1866. He became an instructor at the Royal Military College, Sandhurst, in 1872, and later became Professor of Tactics. He became Deputy Assistant Adjutant & Quartermaster-General in Ireland in 1875, the same year his book, Minor Tactics was published. The book would be highly influential for at least thirty years. In 1877, he was Deputy Assistant Adjutant & Quartermaster-General at Aldershot.

=== South Africa ===
In 1878 Clery, now a major, was sent to South Africa as a special staff officer where he served in two brief expeditions in Griqualand West and Sekhukhuneland. He later took part in the Anglo-Zulu War as the principal staff officer to Colonel Richard Glyn, the man responsible for the centre column of the invasion force. Clery was given the job of marking out a camp near the Isandlwana hill on 20 January 1879. Then, in the early hours of 22 January, he accompanied Glyn, Lord Chelmsford and half of the column as they were drawn away by a decoy element whilst the camp was massacred during the Battle of Isandlwana. He was later transferred to Sir Evelyn Wood's column where he took part in the Battle of Ulundi on 4 July 1879.

=== North Africa ===
In 1882 Clery served as assistant adjutant and quartermaster general in the Egyptian Campaign. He was appointed chief of the staff to the Suakin Expedition of 1884, deputy adjutant-general to the Nile Expedition to relieve Major-General Gordon in 1884 and chief of the staff to the Egyptian Army of Occupation in 1886.

=== Second Boer War ===
After a stint back in Britain, first as commandant of the Staff College, Camberley in 1888, and then, following a promotion to major-general, as commander of the 3rd Brigade at Aldershot in 1894, Clery was, in March 1898, made deputy adjutant general to the Forces. He was then appointed as general officer commanding of the 2nd Division in 1899. He was appointed a Knight Commander of the Order of the Bath in the 1899 Birthday Honours.

Clery led the 2nd Division during the Second Boer War, and was given the temporary rank of lieutenant-general from 9 October 1899. He was briefly hospitalised in February 1900, but returned to duty the following month. For his services during the campaign, he was mentioned in despatches and appointed a Knight Commander of the Order of St Michael and St George.

== Later life ==
Clery retired from the British Army due to ill health in 1901.

He was very eccentric and had a habit of dyeing his prominent side-whiskers blue. In his retirement, he wrote a manual on military tactics. He died on 25 June 1926 at 4 Whitehall Court, Westminster, London.

== Publications ==
- Clery, Cornelius Frances (1875). Minor Tactics. C.K. Paul & co.

== Notes ==
Military offices
Preceded by Edward Clive	Commandant of the Staff College, Camberley; 1888–1893	Succeeded by Henry Hildyard
