= Helpmekaar =

- Location within KwaZulu-Natal Location within South Africa
- Coordinates: 28.435°S 30.417°E
- Country: South Africa
- Province: KwaZulu-Natal
- District: uMzinyathi
- Municipality: Msinga
- Time zone: UTC+2 (SAST)
- Postal code (street): 3000

Helpmekaar is a village 26 km south-east of Dundee on the R33 road. Afrikaans for 'help each other', the name is derived from transport riders having had to assist each other in making a road over a nearby hill.
