= Donald R. Morris =

American novelist

- Born: November 11, 1924; New York City, United States
- Died: December 4/5, 2002 (age 78); Houston, Texas, United States
- Military career
- Allegiance: United States
- Branch: U.S. Navy and U.S. Navy Reserve
- Service years: 1942-1976
- Rank: Lieutenant commander
- Conflicts: World War Two, Korean War, Cold War
- Awards: Navy Commendation Medal
- Other work: CIA officer, novelist, military historian, foreign affairs writer

Donald Robert Morris (November 11, 1924 – December 4/5, 2002) was an American naval officer, Central Intelligence Agency (CIA) officer, novelist, military historian, and foreign affairs writer. He joined the navy in 1942 and after World War Two studied electrical engineering at the United States Naval Academy. Morris served in the Korean War before joining the CIA in 1956, for whom he carried out anti-espionage duties in Berlin, Paris, Kinshasa and Vietnam. Morris had published a novel, China Station, in 1951 and in 1957 published Warm Bodies, based on his naval service; this was made into the film All Hands on Deck in 1961. In 1965 he published The Washing of the Spears, a history of the 1879 Anglo-Zulu War, a book he had worked on mainly during a five-year posting in Berlin. Morris retired from the CIA in 1972 and became a foreign affairs column writer for the Houston Post. He later published his own foreign affairs newsletter.

== Early life and career ==
Donald Morris was born in New York City on November 11, 1924, to S. Fred and Vera D. Morris. He attended Horace Mann School until 1942, when he joined the United States Navy. After the war, Morris entered the United States Naval Academy in Annapolis, Maryland. He graduated with a degree in electrical engineering in 1948. Morris stated that he was ranked first in his class for naval history, second for English, and 409th (out of 410) for electrical engineering. Morris served aboard several destroyers before attending the navy's Intelligence School and learning Russian. He earned two Korean War battle stars and a Navy Commendation Medal. In 1951, he published a novel China Station.

Morris joined the Central Intelligence Agency (CIA) in 1956, though he remained in the United States Navy Reserve, retiring as a lieutenant commander in 1972. Morris spent 17 years in the CIA serving mostly in a Soviet-facing antiespionage role. His service included a five-year stint in Berlin, including the period in which the Berlin Wall was constructed, and postings to Paris, Kinshasa, and Vietnam. In 1957, he published another novel, Warm Bodies, based on his wartime naval service. The work was adapted into the 1961 film All Hands on Deck.

== The Washing of the Spears ==
In 1955, Morris met author Ernest Hemingway in Cuba; the chance encounter gave him the idea of writing a history of the 1879 Anglo-Zulu War; it was published as The Washing of the Spears in 1965. Morris spent eight years writing the book, with the majority of the work being completed during his posting in Berlin. He carried out the research mainly by correspondence with British and South African museums and libraries. It became a standard reference work for later historians and has never been out of print, selling 200,000 copies in 17 languages. It was the first work to attempt to show the Zulu perspective of the war, and although Morris' understanding of that aspect was incomplete, led to his earning the respect of modern Zulu leaders. Historian Ian Knight regards the publication of The Washing of the Spears as marking the modern era of the study of the Anglo-Zulu War.

== Retirement and death ==
Morris lived in Houston, Texas, from 1972. He was a news analyst and writer on foreign affairs for the Houston Post from 1972 to 1989. In 1989, he founded the Trident Syndicate, which published its own foreign affairs periodical, the Donald R. Morris Newsletter, until 2002. Morris was also a commercial pilot and a certified flight instructor for instrument flight.

He was twice married and had four daughters and one son.

Morris died in Houston of complications from heart disease in December 2002; his New York Times death notice states December 4, but Knight's obituary states December 5. His papers, including manuscripts and correspondence, are held by the California Digital Library's Online Archive of California.
