= Thesiger =

Thesiger is a surname, and may refer to:

- Alfred Henry Thesiger (1838–1880), British jurist
- Ernest Thesiger (1879–1961), English stage and film actor
- Eric Thesiger (1874–1961), British soldier and Page of Honour to Queen Victoria
- Frederic Thesiger, 1st Baron Chelmsford (1794–1878), English jurist and politician
- Frederic Thesiger, 2nd Baron Chelmsford (1827–1905), 2nd Baron Chelmsford; British general
- Frederic Thesiger, 1st Viscount Chelmsford (1868–1933), British statesman; Viceroy of India
- George Thesiger (1868–1915), senior officer in the British Army
- Gerald Thesiger (1902–1981), judge of the Queen's Bench Division of the High Court of England and Wales
- Wilfred Gilbert Thesiger (1871–1920), British officer and diplomat
- Wilfred Thesiger (1910–2003), British explorer and travel writer

== See also ==
- Thesiger Bay, Northwest Territories, Canada
