= Arabian Sands =

1959 book by Wilfred Thesiger

- Cover of the first British edition, published by Longmans 1959
- Author: Wilfred Thesiger
- Language: English
- Genre: Travel writing
- Publisher: Longmans, London
- Publication date: 1959
- Media type: Hardback & Paperback
- Pages: 330 pages
- ISBN: 0-14-144207-7

Arabian Sands is a 1959 book by explorer and travel writer Wilfred Thesiger. The book focuses on the author's travels in the Arabian Peninsula between 1945 and 1950, and details his two crossings of the Empty Quarter undertaken between 1946 and 1948. Thesiger’s first crossing, from Mughshin in Oman to Liwa across the eastern sands, was followed by a crossing of the western sands from Manwakh in Yemen, via Laila, to Abu Dhabi.

The book attempted to capture the lives of the Bedu people and other inhabitants of the Arabian peninsula. It is considered a classic of travel literature.

The book largely reflects on the changes and large scale development that took place after the Second World War and the subsequent gradual erosion of traditional Bedouin ways of life that had previously existed unaltered for thousands of years.

== Context ==
Wilfred Thesiger was born into a privileged English background, the son of a diplomat, educated at Eton and Oxford. As soon as he could, on his first summer holiday at university, he travelled to Istanbul, going out by tramp steamer, back by train: the first of many adventurous journeys. At age 23 he went on his first exploration, of the Awash River in Abyssinia (now Ethiopia). He became a colonial officer in Sudan, working in the desert region of Darfur and then the swampy Sudd, where he was responsible for shooting lions. While in Darfur he journeyed with local people by camel and visited the Tibesti Mountains in the Sahara. In the Second World War he fought to liberate Abyssinia under the eccentric but charismatic Orde Wingate, and in the Special Air Service behind enemy lines in the Western Desert of north Africa. After the war he joined the anti-locust unit of the Food and Agriculture Organization, taking the chance between 1945 and 1949 to travel in the Empty Quarter of Arabia. Arabian Sands describes his two crossings of that region.

Thesiger begins his Introduction by saying that if he had thought of writing a book about his journeys, he "should have kept fuller notes which now would have both helped and hindered me". He did however keep some kind of diary of his travels, later polishing his notes in letters to his mother, and then (years later) writing up his books from those. His two Arabian journeys described here took place between 1946 and 1948; the book appeared in 1959.

== Editions ==
Arabian Sands first appeared in 1959 in London (Longmans) and New York (Dutton). It was reprinted in 1960, 1963, 1964 (concise and Penguin editions), 1965, 1971, 1974, 1977, 1983, 1984, 1986, 1990 (Collins), 1991 (with second preface), 2000, 2005 (Folio Society), 2007, 2008, 2009, 2010.

It has been translated into languages including Swedish (Arabisk öken 1960) Spanish (Arenas de arabia 1963, 1998, 1999, 2003, 2008), Italian (Sabbie arabe 1984, 2002), German (Die Brunnen der Wüste 2002), French (Le Désert des Déserts 1978) and Arabic (1994).

== Book ==
Thesiger tells of his love for a hard life in the desert, and how he got the chance to travel into the Empty Quarter (Rub al Khali) from Middle East Locust Control.

While waiting for his Arab escorts, he travels in the Qarra mountains of Dhofar on the southern coast of the Arabian peninsula. He records that the English travellers Bertram Thomas and St. John Philby both crossed the Empty Quarter (in 1929 and 1930), and that he had read Thomas's Arabia Felix and T. E. Lawrence's Revolt in the Desert, which had provoked his interest in the Arabs.

Thesiger describes how he spent five months growing used to the life of the Bedu Arabs in the region to the south of the Empty Quarter, travelling in the Sands of Ghanim and to the Hadhramaut.

On his return to Salalah (in Dhofar, Oman) a year later, he arranges to travel from south to north across the Empty Quarter with Rashid Arab help. He puts together a group of Bait Kathir Arabs to travel to Mughshin. He meets up with the Rashid party at Shisur; they journey to Mughshin at the edge of the Empty Quarter. One of the Rashid falls from his camel, breaking his leg; the party is split, leaving Thesiger with only two Rashid. They take on water from a well in Ghanim and journey northwards across the sands to Ramlat al Ghafa. They know they are short of food. After four days they find a well in the desert at Khaur bin Atarit, with brackish water that was only slightly purgative. Thesiger calculates they can carry water for 20 days, that being the limit the camels can go without water, at a quart per person per day.

The party again divides. With three companions, short of both food and water, they travel across the sands of Uruq al Shaiba to the well at Khaba, near Liwa Oasis. On the way, they do not drink until sunset, when each person receives a ration of one pint of water mixed with camel's milk. On arrival, Thesiger reflects that the journey was not important, however excited he had been at the chance to do it. He feels it was a personal experience, rewarded with a drink of clean water without the usual bitter desert taste, and claims he is content with that. The party returns the long way around the gravel plains of western Oman, avoiding the desert sands. The journey is not easy as the tribes there do not trust them, and they still have little food. They keep secret the fact that Thesiger is not an Arab. After resting at Salala, Thesiger travels easily to Mukalla with the Rashid, though they post sentries as there is a strong raiding party of Dahm Arabs in the area; they hear shots but see no raiders. Once in the town, he shaves and puts on European clothes; his companions barely recognise him.

Thesiger goes back to Arabia hoping to cross the desert further to the west, passing near the Jebel Tuwaiq mountains (south of Riyadh) without the permission of the King, Ibn Saud, and then going northeast to Abu Dhabi. He arranges to meet his Rashid companions and they prepare for the journey at the well at Manwakh. They travel across the western sands of the Empty Quarter to the well at Hassi and the town of Sulaiyil. The people are hostile and the party is effectively arrested and imprisoned; Thesiger sends a telegram of apology to the King.

In Sulaiyil, a Yam Arab shows Thesiger an English rifle, which he had taken from a man called bin Duailan, 'The Cat', whom he had killed; bin Duailan had been one of Thesiger's companions the previous year. Thesiger and his party are released; they are unable to obtain a guide at Laila, and instead travel on their own to Abu Dhabi. He is disturbed to find he is hated as a 'Christian' alien. Without a guide, Thesiger navigates the party for eight days to the next oasis at Jabrin, 150 miles to the northeast, using St. John Philby's map. They learn that two months before, raiders from Dubai had killed 52 Manasir Arabs from Abu Dhabi.

They stay in Abu Dhabi for 20 days; Thesiger describes it as a small town with about 2000 inhabitants. They travel to Buraimi and stay there for a month with the Sheikh (Zayid bin Sultan) before journeying on to Sharja. Thesiger sails from Dubai to Bahrain in a dhow; a gale blows up, and the four-day journey takes eleven days. He comments again that travel is for him a personal venture, not to collect plants or make maps; he claims that writing or talking about it tarnishes the achievement. Thesiger goes back to Buraimi via Dubai and Abu Dhabi, and spends a quiet time visiting the oasis at Liwa and going hawking with Sheikh Zayid.

Thesiger decides to finish his travels in the Arabian peninsula by exploring the quicksands of Umm al Samim in Oman. He takes Rashid Arabs with him on the journey past the quicksands to the south coast. Thesiger travels to the Wahiba Sands and makes his way back, this time with permission from the Imam, to Buraimi.

A year later, in 1949, he goes back to Buraimi hoping to explore the Jabal al Akhadar mountains, but the Imam of Oman refuses permission, and he leaves Arabia for what he realizes is the last time. He expresses sorrow at leaving behind something he greatly loved and was sure he would not find elsewhere. He regretted, too, the fate of his Bedu companions who would soon lose the desert for a more secure but less free world.

== Reception ==
=== Contemporary ===
The Times gave the book a favourable review on its publication in 1959, describing Thesiger as 'the last of a great line of Arabian explorers', and his book as 'the most readable' of books written by British explorers about the Gulf.

=== Modern ===
One of Thesiger's biographers, Michael Asher, wrote in The Guardian that "his description of the traditional life of the Bedu, Arabian Sands (1959), [was] probably the finest book ever written about Arabia and a tribute to a world now lost forever."

The critic Michael Dirda commented that "for years I meant to read Arabian Sands ... Now that I have, I can sheepishly join the chorus of those who revere the book as one of the half dozen greatest works of modern English travel writing." He calls the book "the austere masterpiece", comparing it with Apsley Cherry-Garrard's The Worst Journey in the World, C. M. Doughty's Travels in Arabia Deserta and T. E. Lawrence's Seven Pillars of Wisdom. He notes that Thesiger's writing can be vivid, "but in general his prose is terse, declarative, coolly observational." Dirda contrasts this coolness with the passion in his photographs, which "make clear his love for this bleak, unforgiving terrain" or the handsome young men such as Salim bin Ghabaisha.

The Telegraph called the book a "precise yet emotionally charged account of his desert journeys", adding that it "gained him a new reputation in late middle age as a writer, albeit one influenced by the romanticised prose of Lawrence and Doughty."

National Geographic includes the book in its "100 Greatest Adventure Books of All Time", commenting that it is "written with great respect" for the Bedouin, "a door opening on a vanished feudal world."

== Legacy ==
In 2008, the Emirates film director Majid Abdulrazak produced a film version of Arabian Sands with actors from the UAE and Oman in major roles.

== Bibliography ==
- Arabian Sands (1959) Great Britain: Longmans, Green; USA: E. P. Dutton.

--- (1964) Penguin Books
--- (1984) Penguin Books, with new preface
--- (1991) Penguin Books, second preface
--- (2008) Penguin Books, with introduction by Rory Stewart
