= Oman–Saudi Arabia border =

International border

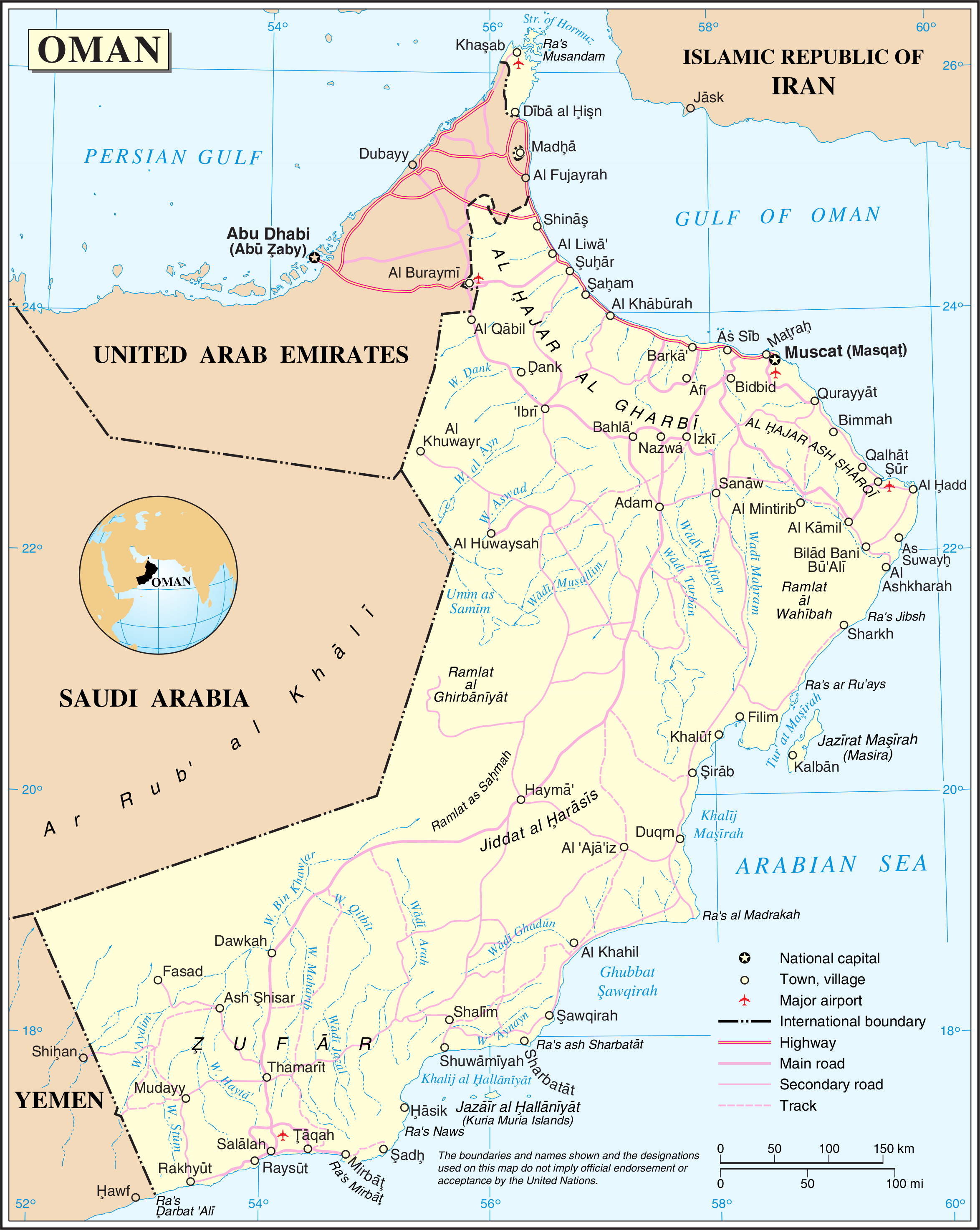
Map of Oman, with Saudi Arabia to the west

The Oman–Saudi Arabia border is 658 km (409 mi) in length and runs from the tripoint with the United Arab Emirates in the north to the tripoint with Yemen in the south-west.

== Description ==
The border starts in the north at the tripoint with the UAE; it consists of three straight lines: the first orientated NW-SE (91 km; 57 mi), the second NE-SW (233 km; 145 mi), and the third NE-SW (334 km; 207 mi), terminating at the Yemeni tripoint. The border lies entirely within the barren Rub' al Khali desert, or 'empty quarter' of Arabia. The Umm al Samim quicksand area also lies on the border, at the first ‘bend’ in the north.

== History ==
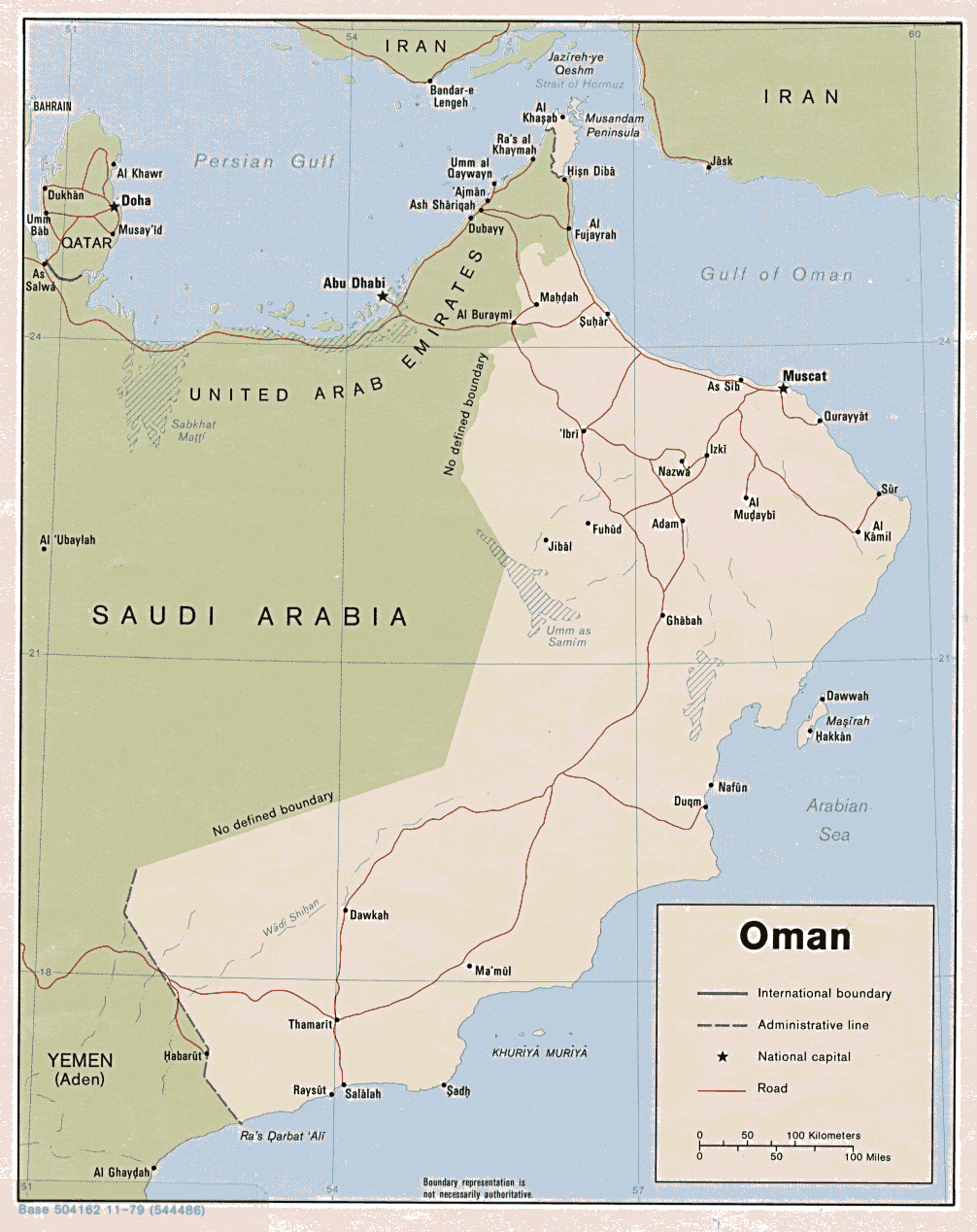
Map of Oman from 1979, showing the Saudi border as undefined

Historically there was no clearly defined boundary in this part of the Arabian peninsula; at the start of the 20th century the Ottoman Empire controlled the western coast and Britain the east and south (ruled indirectly via the Sultan of Oman and local sheikhs and emirs), with the interior consisting of loosely organised Arab groupings, occasionally forming emirates, most prominent of which was the Emirate of Nejd and Hasa ruled by the al-Saud family. Britain and the Ottoman Empire theoretically divided their realms of influence in Arabia via the so-called 'Blue' and 'Violet lines' in 1913–14, however these agreements were rendered null and void following the collapse of the Ottoman Empire after the First World War.

During the First World War an Arab Revolt, supported by Britain, succeeded in removing the Ottomans from much of the Middle East; in the period following this Ibn Saud managed to expand his kingdom considerably, eventually proclaiming the Kingdom of Saudi Arabia in 1932. Ibn Saud refused to recognise the Anglo-Ottoman lines and lay claim to large parts of the eastern Arabian hinterland (the so-called ‘Hamza line’).

On 25 November 1935 British officials met with Ibn Saud in an attempt to finalise a frontier between the new kingdom and its coastal protectorates, including Oman, which was ruled by an independent sultan under heavy British influence. The conference proved abortive however and the issue remained unresolved. In 1955, following an attempt by Saudi Arabia to assert its control over the Buraimi Oasis on the Oman-UAE border, Britain stated that it would unilaterally use a slightly modified version of the 1935 'Riyadh line' henceforth.

Following talks held in 1989, on 21 March 1990 a border treaty was signed between King Fahd of Saudi Arabia and Oman's Sultan Qaboos at Hafr al-Batin, and then ratified in May 1991. This agreement finalised the border at the 1955 modified Riyadh line. On-the-ground demarcation then followed with the assistance of the German aerial photography company Hansa Luftbild, being completed in 1995.

== Border crossings ==
The first official border crossing, at Ramlat Khaliya in the far northern section of the frontier, was opened in 2006.

== See also ==
- Oman-Saudi Arabia relations
- Saudi Arabia–Yemen border
  - Treaty of Jeddah (2000) formally defining the Saudi Arabia–Yemen border
