= Salim bin Ghabaisha =

- Born: Salim bin Ghabaisha Al Rashidi; 1930; Abu Dhabi, Trucial States
- Died: 2 January 2016 (aged 85–86); Abu Dhabi, United Arab Emirates
- Known for: Crossing Rub' al Khali desert, Wilfred Thesiger companion.

Salim bin Ghabaisha (Arabic: سالم بن غبيشة) (1930 – 2 January 2016) was a Bedouin of the Rashid tribe, notable for being a key member of the travelling party commissioned by Sir Wilfred Thesiger during his two crossings of the Rub' al Khali undertaken between 1946 and 1948. Bin Ghabaisha, along with Salim bin Kabina, is frequently mentioned in Thesiger's book Arabian Sands, which details Thesiger's travels and his observations of the culture of the Bedouin in the Arabian Peninsula around the time of the discovery of oil in the Arabian Peninsula.

Bin Ghabaisha was 17 years old when he first crossed the Rub' al Khali desert and became one of the closest companions to Thesiger. He features in several of Thesiger's photographs of both crossings, which have been displayed in Pitt Rivers Museum, Oxford since Thesiger donated his vast collection of 38,000 negatives to the museum.

Thesiger described Salim bin Ghabaisha in Arabian Sands as one of the most competent of his companions: 'the others tended to rely on his judgment, as I did myself. He was certainly the best rider and the best shot, and always graceful in everything he did. He had a quick smile and a gentle manner, but I already suspected that he could be both reckless and ruthless, and I was not surprised when within two years he had become one of the most daring outlaws on the Trucial Coast with half a dozen blood-feuds on his hands' (1960: 208–9).

Bin Ghabaisha became one of the icons of the pre-oil era in the United Arab Emirates and was subjected to various interviews and Emirati documentaries in his late years to depict his experience as a traveler. He died on 2 January 2016 in Abu Dhabi.

== See also ==
- Wilfred Thesiger
- Arabian Sands
