= Viscount Chelmsford =

Title in the Peerage of the United Kingdom

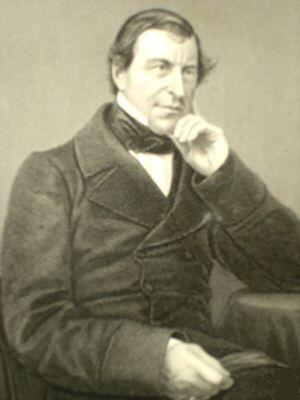
Frederic Thesiger, 1st Baron Chelmsford

Viscount Chelmsford, of Chelmsford in the County of Essex, is a title in the Peerage of the United Kingdom. It was created in 1921 for Frederic Thesiger, 3rd Baron Chelmsford, the former Viceroy of India. The title of Baron Chelmsford, of Chelmsford in the County of Essex, was created in the Peerage of the United Kingdom in 1858 for the first Viscount's grandfather, the lawyer and Conservative Sir Frederic Thesiger, who twice served as Lord Chancellor of Great Britain. Then following was the 2nd Baron, who gained the rank of general and was awarded GCB, GCVO. As of 2010 the titles are held by the first Viscount's great-grandson, the fourth Viscount, who succeeded his father in 1999.

Several other members of the Thesiger family have also gained distinction. Sir Frederic Thesiger (died 1805), uncle of the first baron, was a captain in the Royal Navy and served as Aide-de-Camp to Lord Nelson at the Battle of Copenhagen in 1801. The Hon. Charles Wemyss Thesiger (1831–1903), second son of the first Baron, was a Lieutenant-General in the Army. His eldest son George Thesiger was a temporary Major-General in the Army and was killed in the First World War. His son Sir Gerald Thesiger was a Judge of the High Court of Justice. The Hon. Alfred Thesiger, third son of the first Baron, was a Lord Justice of Appeal. The Hon. Sir Edward Pierson Thesiger (1842–1928), fourth son of the first Baron, was Clerk-Assistant to Parliament from 1890 to 1917. His second son Sir Bertram Sackville Thesiger (1875–1966) was a naval commander and served as Commander-in-Chief of the East Indies Station between 1927 and 1929 while his third son Ernest Thesiger was an actor. The Hon. Wilfred Gilbert Thesiger (1871–1920), third son of the second Baron, was Consul-General and Minister Plenipotentiary to Addis Ababa. His eldest son Sir Wilfred Thesiger was an explorer and travel writer. The Hon. Eric Thesiger, fourth son of the second Baron, was a soldier and courtier.

== Barons Chelmsford (1858) ==
- Frederic Thesiger, 1st Baron Chelmsford (1794–1878)
- Frederic Augustus Thesiger, 2nd Baron Chelmsford (1827–1905)
- Frederic John Napier Thesiger, 3rd Baron Chelmsford (1868–1933) (created Viscount Chelmsford in 1921)

== Viscounts Chelmsford (1921) ==
- Frederic John Napier Thesiger, 1st Viscount Chelmsford (1868–1933)
  - Hon. Frederic Ivor Thesiger (1896–1917)
- Andrew Charles Gerald Thesiger, 2nd Viscount Chelmsford (1903–1970)
- (Frederic) Jan Thesiger, 3rd Viscount Chelmsford (1931–1999)
- Frederic Corin Piers Thesiger, 4th Viscount Chelmsford (born 1962)

== Arms ==
Coat of arms of Viscount Chelmsford
Crest A cornucopia fesswise the horn Or the fruit Proper thereon a dove holding in the beak a sprig of laurel also Proper. Escutcheon Gules a griffin segreant Or within an orle of roses Argent barbed and seeded Proper. Supporters On either side a griffin Or winged Vair Motto Spes Et Fortuna (Hope and Fortune)

== Notes ==
=== Books ===
- Hesilrige, Arthur G. M. (1921). Debrett's Peerage and Titles of courtesy. London: Dean & Son. p. 195.
- Greaves, Adrian (2011). Isandlwana: How the Zulus humbled the British Empire. South Yorkshire: Pen & Sword Military. ISBN 978-1-84884-532-9.
- Kidd, Charles; Williamson, David, eds. (1990). Debrett's Peerage and Baronetage. New York: St Martin's Press.
- Mosley, Charles (2002). Burke's Peerage and Baronetage (107th ed.). London: Cassells.
