= Oman–Saudi Arabia relations =

- Oman: Saudi Arabia

Oman–Saudi Arabia relations refers to the current and historical relations between Sultanate of Oman and Kingdom of Saudi Arabia. Oman has an embassy in Riyadh and a consulate in Jeddah, whilst Saudi Arabia has an embassy in Muscat.

The two nations have a long historical relationship. Both are members of the Gulf Cooperation Council and mainly adhere to Islam. Oman follows Ibadi Islam while Saudi Arabia follows Sunni Islam. Both being gulf states, make them strong allies; however, Oman has a more lenient approach when it comes to Iran.

The two countries share a long border, second in length only to the Saudi Arabia–Yemen border.

== History ==
=== Khawarij movement ===
The Khawarij, a radical Islamic group formed after the death of Muhammad in what would be today Saudi Arabia, was responsible for the revolt against Caliph Ali. However, some of them, following the more moderate and disagreed with the Khawarij, refused the authority of Khawarij and moved into South Arabia, which would be today Oman. Thus, the moderate party formed the Ibadi movement, in which later became the core of Omani culture. The Ibadi is the only surviving force of the Khawarij movement.

== Modern relations ==
As both Oman and Saudi Arabia's modern political approach formed amidst the withdrawal of British Armed Forces, they established relationship at 1971. However, Oman has chosen a moderate approach in political agenda in comparison to Saudi Arabia. Oman has been acting as a mediator that keeping relationship with Iran when Iran has tensions with other Arab countries, and since then has become a bridge connecting relationship between two countries. Also, Oman is not a member of the Saudi-led coalition in the Yemeni Civil War. Instead, the Omani government has prioritized diplomatic resolution of tensions. In September 2023, cease-fire talks with the Houthi leadership began in Riyadh with Omani involvement.
