= Wilfred Gilbert Thesiger =

British army officer & diplomat (1871-1920)

Wilfred Gilbert Thesiger DSO
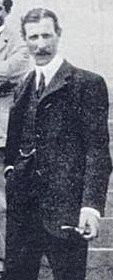
- Wilfred Gilbert Thesiger
- Born: 25 March 1871
- Died: 31 January 1920 (aged 48)
- Spouse: Kathleen Mary Vigors (m. 1909)
- Children: 4
- Parents: Frederic Augustus Thesiger (father); Adria Fanny Heath (mother)
- Relatives: Frederic Thesiger, 1st Baron Chelmsford (paternal grandfather); Frederic Thesiger (brother); Lt-Gen Sir Eric Thesiger (brother); Sir Wilfred Patrick Thesiger (son)
- Military career
- Allegiance: United Kingdom
- Branch: British Army
- Service years: 1899-1901
- Rank: Captain
- Unit: Imperial Yeomanry
- Conflicts: Second Boer War
- Awards: Mentioned in despatches Distinguished Service Order

Wilfred Gilbert Thesiger DSO (25 March 1871 – 31 January 1920) was a British officer and diplomat, who was British Minister in Ethiopia from 1909 to 1919.

== Background and early life ==
Thesiger was born into a well-connected family of politicians, officers and diplomats. He was a younger son of the 2nd Baron Chelmsford by Adria Fanny Heath, daughter of Major-General John Coussamker Heath. His father was a General, his grandfather the 1st Baron Chelmsford was twice Lord Chancellor of the United Kingdom, and his elder brother Frederic Thesiger had a distinguished career as colonial governor, became Viceroy of India and was created Viscount Chelmsford. Lieutenant-General Sir Eric Thesiger was a younger brother.

== Career ==
In 1896 Thesiger stayed in the Vice-Consulate in Van, Eastern Turkey, to learn Turkish. Between 1897 and 1900 he was Vice-Consul to Taranto.

Following the outbreak of the Second Boer War in late 1899, Thesiger volunteered for active service and was attached as a lieutenant to the 59th Company of the 15th Battalion, Imperial Yeomanry, on 24 March 1900. The company had left the United Kingdom for South Africa in the SS Mahratta in early March 1900. After arrival, he fought with the battalion between 1900 and 1901, and was mentioned in despatches. For his services he was appointed a Companion of the Distinguished Service Order (DSO) in 1900 and promoted to the rank of captain. He resigned his commission in December 1901, and was granted the honorary rank of captain in the army. Following his return to Europe, he re-entered the diplomatic service, and held the following offices:

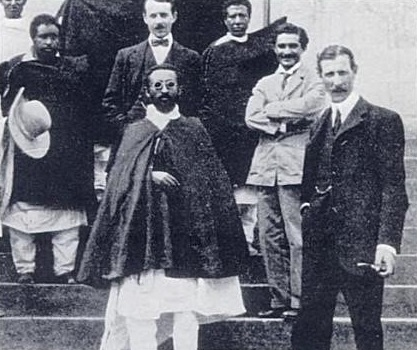
Wilfred Gilbert Thesiger (right) with the future Haile Selassie in 1917

- 1901-1906: Vice-Consul to Belgrade
- 1906-1908: Consul to St. Petersburg
- 1908-1909: Consul to Boma, Congo

While British Vice Consul to the Congo he spent three months in the Kasai basin and reported to the British Parliament on incidents of starvation and brutality in the region while people were put to work as slaves on rubber plantations in the Belgium-controlled Congo Free State.

From 1909 until 1919 he was Consul-General at Addis Ababa, with the local rank of Envoy Extraordinary and Minister Plenipotentiary to the Court of the Emperor.

He fought in the First World War, where he was mentioned in despatches. He was decorated with the award of the Order of the Star of Ethiopia (1st Class).

== Family ==
Thesiger married Kathleen Mary Vigors, aged 29, daughter of Thomas Mercer Cliffe Vigors, at St Peter's Church, Eaton Square, in London, on 21 August 1909. They had four children:

- Sir Wilfred Patrick Thesiger, b. 3 June 1910, d. 24 August 2003
- Colonel Brian Peirson Doughty-Wylie, b. 4 October 1911, d. 1982
- P/O. Dermot Vigors Thesiger, b. 24 March 1914, d. 28 April 1942
- Captain Roderic Miles Doughty Thesiger, b. 8 November 1915, d. 5 March 2005

Thesiger lived at Milebrook House, Bucknell, Powys, Wales.

== Styles ==
- Mr Wilfred Thesiger (1871–1878)
- The Hon Wilfred Thesiger (1878–1920)
