= Ramlat Khaliya =

- Border checkpoint
- Location within Oman
- Coordinates: 22°16′49″N 55°29′21″E
- Border: Oman – Saudi Arabia

Ramlat Khaliya (Arabic: رملات خالية) is the first border checkpoint to have been established on the Oman–Saudi Arabia border. It is formally known as Ramlat Khaliya entry point on the Omani side of the border and Rub Al-Khali entry point on the Saudi Arabian side of the border.

The establishment of the border checkpoint was announced by the two countries in 2006. The checkpoint connects the Eastern Province of Saudi Arabia with the Ad Dhahirah Region of Oman. It is located in the Rub' al Khali desert.
