= Hajar Ali =

Singaporean entrepreneur

Hajar Ali (born 1978 or 1979) is a Singaporean entrepreneur, founder of Urbane Nomads and the website Travel Like a Humanitarian. She was the first recorded woman to cross the Rub' al Khali, the "Empty Quarter" of the Arabian Peninsula.

== Education ==
Hajar has a master's degree in strategic studies from the Institute of Defense and Strategic Studies in Singapore, now the S. Rajaratnam School of International Studies; her thesis "[applied] James C Scott’s model of peasant resistance to the daily transgressions of Iranian youths against the ruling mullahs".

== Career ==
Hajar had previously worked as a real estate agent.

Hajar founded Urbane Nomads, a bespoke luxury travel agency, in 2008 after conceiving the idea while traveling in Patagonia. A lover of horses, she likes to include riding in the company's trips. She later launched Travel Like a Humanitarian, a website on which NGOs can advertise travel offerings.

In 2011, Hajar was included by Singapore Women's Weekly in its annual "Great Women of Our Time".

In March 2012, Hajar made the first known crossing of the Rub' al Khali by a woman. She intends to make a future expedition to the pole of inaccessibility in Antarctica.

Hajar serves as the editor of Mensa Singapore's newsletter and is a Fellow of the Royal Geographical Society.

== Personal life ==
Hajar considers Singapore her home, but as of November 2015 lives in Istanbul. She has a Bengal cat named Loki. Hajar is a practicing Muslim but does not wear the hijab.
