= Rashid (tribe) =

Bedouin tribe of the United Arab Emirates

The Rashid (singular Rashidi) is an Arab tribe of the United Arab Emirates.

== Origins ==
A small tribe, according to Thesiger numbering some 300 strong, the Rashid had a wide migration area, stretching from Buraimi to the Abu Dhabi coast, and as far south as Hadhramut, but centred on the Dhafrah area of present day Abu Dhabi, to the West of Liwa. They would often summer at Buraimi.

== Raiders ==
Thesiger described the Rashid as "among the most authentic of the Bedu, the least affected by the outside world." His own guide, Salim bin Ghabaishah was a Rashidi who had to be rescued from jail in Sharjah by Sheikh Hazza bin Sultan Al Nahyan after he was caught raiding in 1950. Bertram Thomas described the Rashid as "the only genuine tribe of the Southern sands."

Belonging to the Hinawi tradition, the Rashid were frequently raiders and maintained a number of lively tribal enmities, particularly with the Ghafiri Saar and Duru. They were renowned as breeders of hardy camels and unlike many other tribes of the Trucial States did not settle or maintain date plantations but depended entirely on animal husbandry for their living. Thomas notes at the time he travelled with the Rashid that a period of conflict with the Saar had resulted in a decay in Rashid fortunes, so that a tribesman with five camels to his name was "comparatively well off".
