= Mundafan =

Former lake in Saudi Arabia

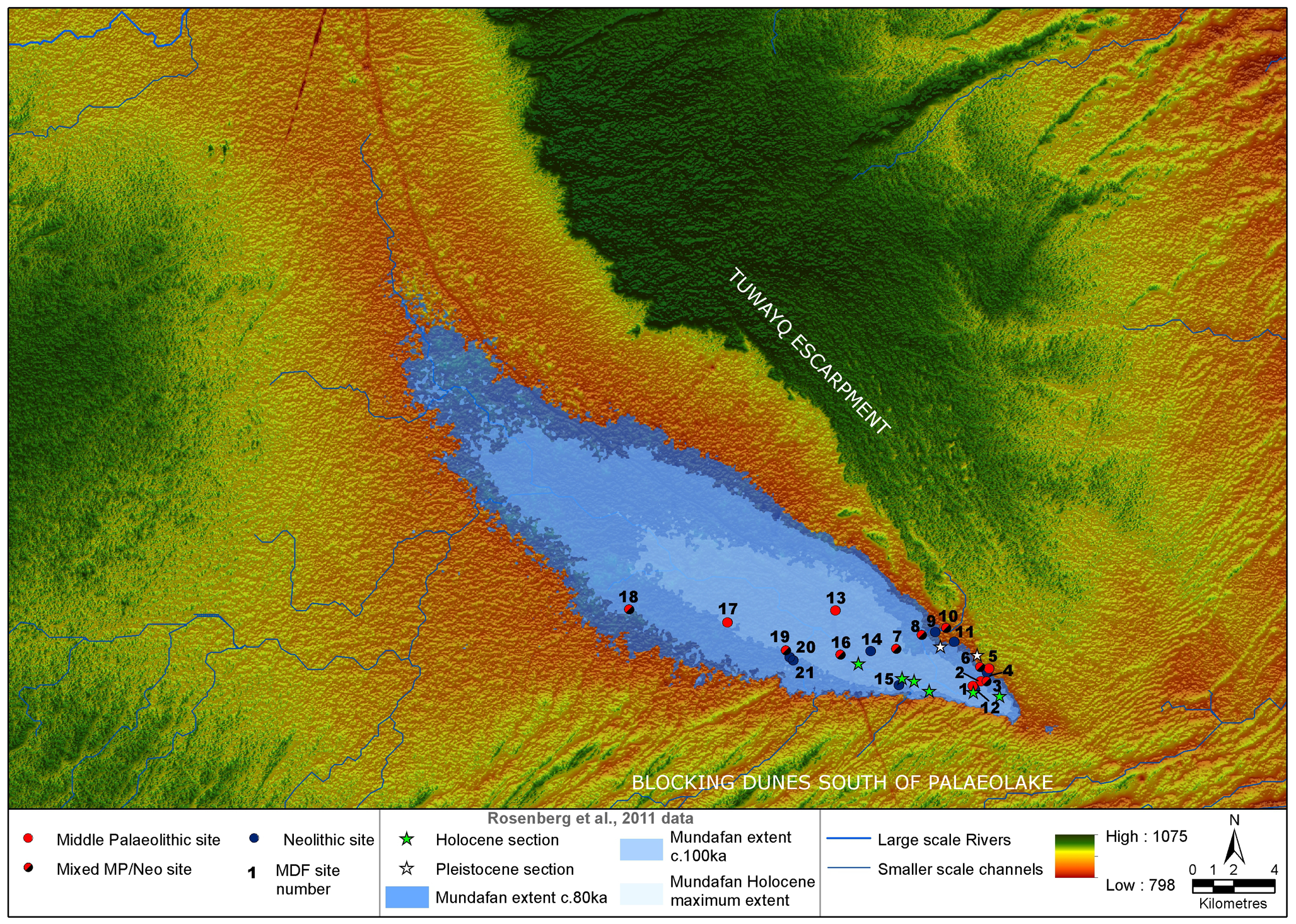

- Coordinates: 18.56°N 45.34°E

Mundafan was a former lake in Saudi Arabia, within presently desert-like areas. It formed during the Pleistocene and Holocene, when orbitally mediated changes in climate increased monsoon precipitation in the peninsula, allowing runoff to form a lake with a maximum area of 300 square kilometres (120 sq mi). It was populated by fishes and surrounded by reeds and savanna, which supported human populations.

== Geography and lake ==
Mundafan is a lies in the Najran Province of Saudi Arabia, southwest of the Rub' al Khali desert. The climate of the region is arid to hyperarid, with sand and stone deserts dominating the landscape. The name Arabic: Ramlat al-Mundafan means "the buried sands".

The perennial lake had an elongated shape in northwest–southeast direction and reached a maximum depth of 30 metres (98 ft) and extent of 300 square kilometres (120 sq mi) during stages of high water levels, making it one of the largest former lakes of Arabia. It is possible that it was not one contiguous water body, but rather several separate lakes or an extended wetland. The lake was fed by wadis coming from the Asir Mountains to the west and contained freshwater, although there is also evidence for brackish water. Carbonate sediments formed when parts of the lake bed fell dry.

Mussels (Unio), snails (Biomphalaria and Radix), sponges and submerged stoneworts (a type of algae) lived in the lake, which was fringed by reeds (Phragmites and Typha), sedges and marshes. Indirect evidence attests to the existence of fish in the lake. Riparian forests and savannah environments developed around the lake, with trees including possibly palms. Wildfires occasionally burned in the area. The environment was suitable for humans and Mundafan was an important hunting ground for early humans. Aurochs, camels, wild cattle, gazelles, wild goats, hartebeest, hippopotamuses, horses, ostriches, tahr, water buffalo, wild sheep and wild asses lived around the Mundafan lake.

The lake has left sediments made out of clays, marls and silts that form benches and mounds. The sediments reach thicknesses of 24 metres (79 ft). The sparseness of lake deposits has led to some researchers to doubt that the waterbodies were lakes rather than wetlands, but circumstantial fossil evidence strongly implies that the waterbodies were true lakes and that the rarity of lake landforms is primarily a consequence of wind erosion, which removed these landforms after the lakes had dried up.

The Mundafan lake formed in a c. 363 square kilometres (140 sq mi) topographical depression formed by wind deflation. To the east rises the Tuwaiq Escarpment, a limestone of Jurassic age. The lake lies within a former river bed that was blocked by dunes or perhaps faulting and might have overflowed northwards if its surface area exceeded 346 square kilometres (134 sq mi). The catchment of the Mundafan lake is comparatively large, leading to the formation of long-lasting (at least 800 years) lakes and the thickest lake deposits of Arabia.

== History and climatic implications ==
There were two high water stages, one dated to marine isotope stage 5 (MIS 5) c and a (100,000 and 80,000 years ago, respectively) and the other to the early Holocene between 9,000 and 6,000 years ago. The minimum surface area of the lake reached c. 100 square kilometres (39 sq mi) 100,000 years ago, c. 210 square kilometres (81 sq mi) 80,000 years ago and c. 58 square kilometres (22 sq mi) during the Holocene; the actual extent of the lake might have been larger, as lake sediments might have been removed by wind after the lake dried up. During the Holocene, the maximum depth may have reached 10 metres (33 ft).

Increased insolation periodically caused the African monsoon to become stronger and reach farther north on the Arabian Peninsula, activating wadis and filling lakes. These wet periods are recorded in stalagmites of Oman and Yemen and in lake sediments. The increased precipitation allowed the growth of vegetation in what today is hostile desert, in turn permitting animals and humans to get established there. Some researchers however advocate that wet periods took place during glacial times.

== Human history ==
The past climate and human movements through the interior Arabian Peninsula have come under scientific focus in the 2010s, with suggestions that human populations preferentially migrated during wet periods. Numerous archaeological sites are linked to former lakes. Research at Mundafan was initially hindered by the hostile climate conditions.

There are archaeological sites of Middle Paleolithic to Neolithic age at Mundafan, often near or on former shorelines but also towards the lake interior, implying that the area was occupied even during low water level. Humans at Mundafan were not sedentary and traded with obsidian from Yemen, farther south. The site MDF-61 at the southwestern end of the lake provided an easy access to its environments and was in use for a long time, leading to the accumulation of large amounts of lithic artifacts such as arrowheads similar to these found in the Levant and Africa. These sites demonstrate that Homo sapiens was present in Arabia, endorsing the theory of an out of Africa migration of mankind which constituted its pivotal expansion event.
