= Gerald Thesiger =

Sir Gerald Thesiger MBE

Justice of the High Court
- In office 1958–1978

Personal details
- Born: 25 December 1902 Holyport, Berkshire, England
- Education: Gresham's School; Magdalen College, Oxford

Sir Gerald Alfred Thesiger, MBE (25 December 1902 – 16 April 1981) was a judge of the High Court of England and Wales of the Queen's Bench Division between 1958 and 1978.

== Early life and education ==
Thesiger was born on Christmas Day 1902 in Holyport, Berkshire. He was the son of Major-General George Handcock Thesiger and his wife, Frances Fremantle, daughter of General Fitzroy William Fremantle. He was educated at Gresham's School, Holt, Magdalen College, Oxford (1922–1925), and the Inner Temple.

Thesiger's grandfather was Lt.-General the Hon. Charles Wemyss Thesiger, a younger son of a Lord Chancellor, Frederic Thesiger, 1st Baron Chelmsford. The British general Frederic Thesiger, 2nd Baron Chelmsford, and the judge Alfred Henry Thesiger (one of the youngest Lords Justices of Appeal in history) were his great-uncles.

== Career ==
In 1926, he was called to the Bar as a barrister. He was appointed Recorder of Rye in 1937.

During World War II, he was commissioned as a Major in the Office of the Judge Advocate General, and was appointed Recorder of Hastings in 1942. He entered local government in London, initially as a member of Fulham Borough Council from 1934 to 1937 and then of Chelsea Borough Council from 1937 to 1958. He was Mayor of Chelsea from 1944 to 1946. He took silk as a King's Counsel in 1948 and was appointed Recorder of Southend-on-Sea in 1952. He became a Bencher of the Inner Temple in 1956 and served as a High Court Judge of the Queen's Bench Division between 1958 and 1978.

== Personal life ==
On 28 July 1932, Thesiger married Marjorie Ellen Guille, daughter of Raymond Guille of Long Island, New York, and they had three daughters, Oonah Caroline Thesiger (born 1936), Virginia Mary (born 1941, died 1972), and Juliet Elizabeth (born 1943).

== Honours ==
- Member of the Order of the British Empire, 1946
- Knight, 1958
- President of the British Academy of Forensic Sciences

== Publications ==
- The Judge and the Expert Witness in Medicine, Science and the Law, 1975, volume 15
