= Zamakh wa Manwakh district =

Coordinates: 16°50′N 48°00′E

Zamakh wa Manwakh District مديرية زمخ ومنوخ
- District
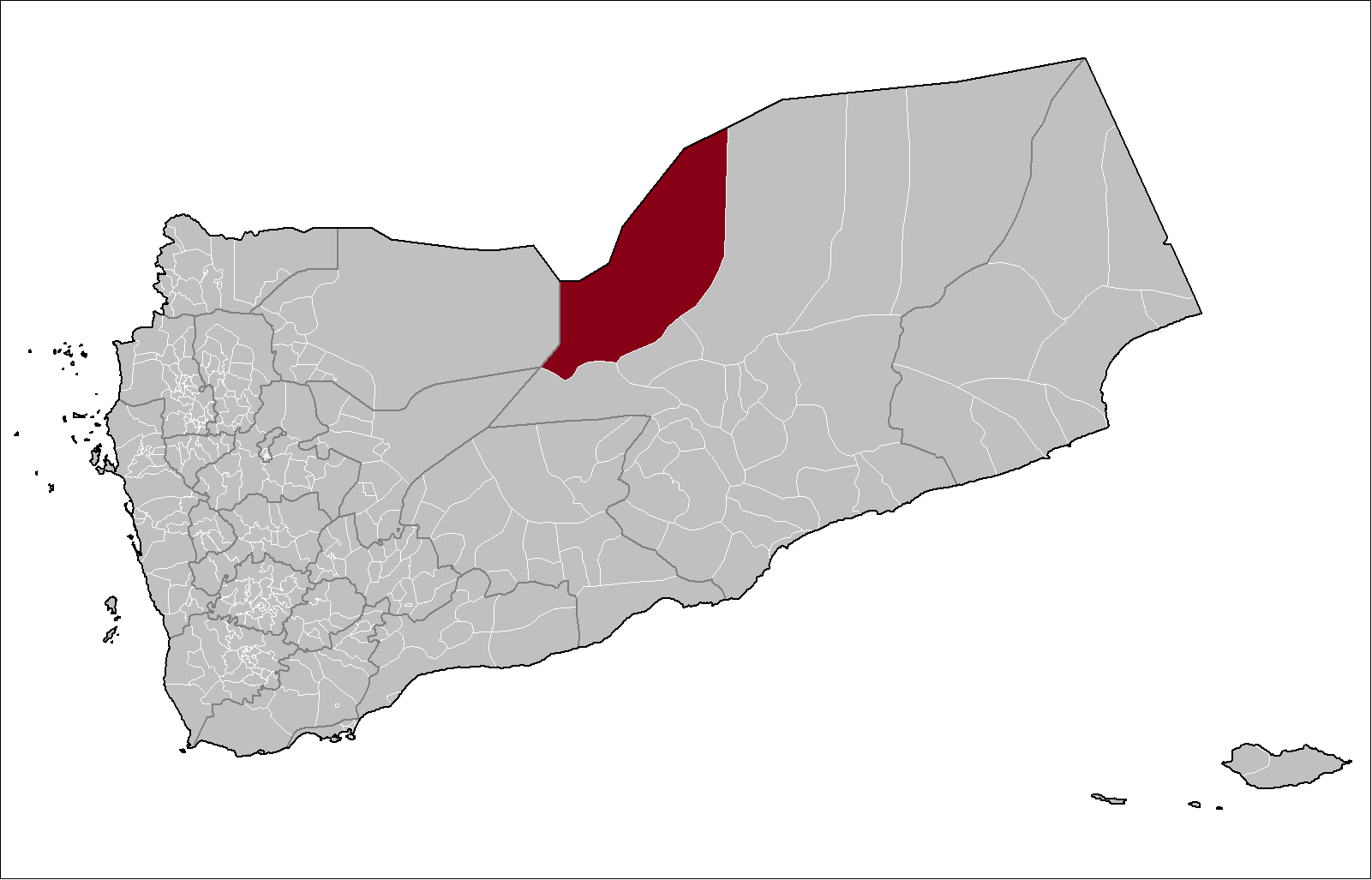
- The district highlighted in Yemen
- Country: Yemen
- Governorate: Hadhramaut

Population (2021)
  - Total: 2,333
- Time zone: UTC+3 (Yemen Standard Time)

Zamakh wa Manwakh District (Arabic: مديرية زمخ ومنوخ) is a large district of the Hadhramaut Governorate, Yemen. It is one of the largest districts in Yemen. As of 2021, the district had a population of 2,333 inhabitants.
