= Umm al Samim =

Area of quicksand in the Rub' al Khali desert

Coordinates: 21°38′N 55°54′E

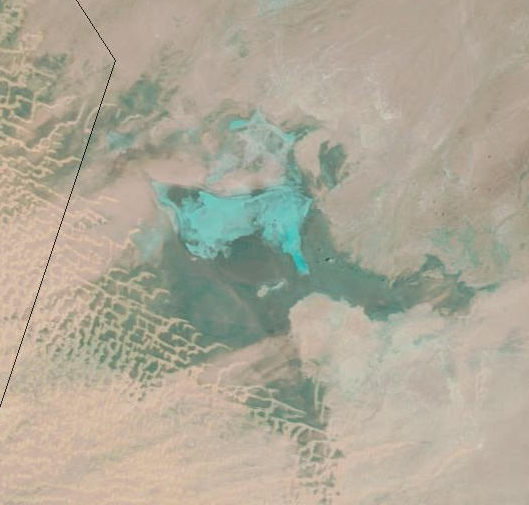
Umm al Samim aerial shot

The Umm al Samim (Arabic: أُمّ اَلسَّمِيم) (also known as the Umm as Samim) is a quicksand area on the eastern edge of the Rub al'khali desert largely within Oman's borders. The waters, such as they are, drain into this brackish low-lying closed basin area off the Omani mountains and the wadis of the Rub al'khali. The Al Samim (known locally as the 'Mother of Poisons' or the 'Mother of Worries') is a salt marsh with a solid-looking crust, but can be very treacherous when broken through. There is little vegetation.

Sir Wilfred Thesiger was the first European to see the area in the late 1940s after his travels from Salalah in Oman.
