= Eric Thesiger =

British army officer (1874-1961)

Lieutenant-Colonel Sir Eric Richard Thesiger DSO, TD
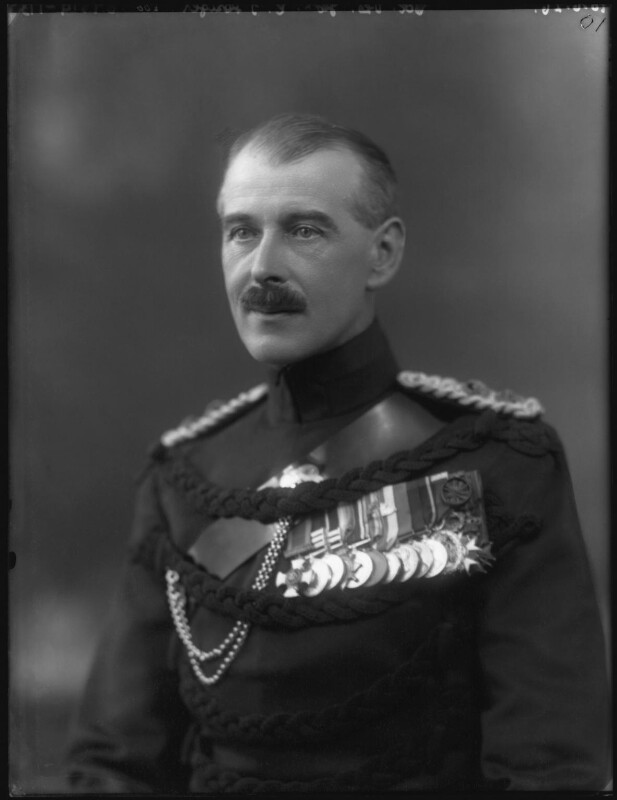
- Thesiger in 1926
- Born: 17 February 1874; London, England
- Died: 2 October 1961 (aged 87)
- Education: Winchester College
- Spouse(s): Pearl Marie Coupland (m. 1904; died 1922) Sydney Hilda Hutton-Croft (m. 1929; died 1930) Mary Pudsey (m. 1953; died 1954)
- Children: 3
- Parents: Frederic Thesiger, 2nd Baron Chelmsford (father); Adria Fanny Heath (mother)
- Relatives: Frederic Thesiger (brother); Wilfred Gilbert Thesiger (brother); Wilfred Thesiger (nephew)
- Military career
- Allegiance: United Kingdom
- Branch: British Army
- Service years: 1899-1929
- Rank: Lieutenant-Colonel
- Units: Imperial Yeomanry; Surrey Yeomanry; Territorial Force; King's Royal Rifle Corps
- Commands: Royal West Kent Regiment
- Conflicts: Second Boer War; World War I
- Awards: Mentioned in despatches Distinguished Service Order; Territorial Decoration

Lieutenant-Colonel Sir Eric Richard Thesiger DSO, TD (17 February 1874 – 2 October 1961), styled The Honourable from 1878, was a British soldier and page to Queen Victoria.

== Background ==
Born in London on 17 February 1874, Thesiger was the fourth son of General Frederic Thesiger, 2nd Baron Chelmsford and his wife Adria Fanny Heath, daughter of Major-General John Coussamker Heath. His older brothers were Frederic Thesiger, 1st Viscount Chelmsford, later Viceroy of India, and the diplomat Wilfred Gilbert Thesiger. Thesiger was educated at Winchester College and in 1884 he was nominated Page of Honour to the Queen, a post he fulfilled for the following six years. In 1893, he became a Staff Commissioner of Police.

== Career ==
Thesiger joined the Imperial Yeomanry as a private during the Second Boer War, and was commissioned as a lieutenant in the 15th Battalion on 29 November 1900. On 1 November 1901 he was promoted to captain in the battalion, with the temporary rank of captain in the Army. He stayed in South Africa until the war ended in June 1902, left Port Elizabeth for Southampton on the SS Colombian the following month, and relinquished his commission in the Imperial Yeomanry on 3 September 1902, when he was granted the honorary rank of captain in the Army. In late 1902 he became a second lieutenant in the Surrey Yeomanry. He was a major when the Yeomanry were transferred into the Territorial Force in 1908.

He served during World War I, in various roles, (Note: The C Squadron war diary cryptically refers to the 'unexpected return of Major Thesiger who rejoined his unit after 2 1/2 year's absence spent in acquiring military knowledge in other branches of the service'.) returning in July 1917 to command C Squadron, Surrey Yeomanry, which at the time was serving as part of III Corps Cavalry Regiment. The regiment was then broken up and the yeomen retrained as infantry. In September Thesiger and C Sqn joined 10th (Service) Battalion, Queen's (Royal West Surrey Regiment) (Battersea), where he became second-in-command. Shortly afterwards he was transferred to a battalion of the King's Royal Rifle Corps, but rejoined 10th Queen's as its temporary commander after the German spring offensive. He was then appointed to command 10th (Service) Battalion, Royal West Kent Regiment (Kent County) for the rest of the war. He relinquished his command and temporary rank of Lieutenant-Colonel on 13 May 1919.

During the war he had been wounded twice and mentioned in despatches twice. In June 1919 he was awarded the Distinguished Service Order (DSO) and in August, he received the Territorial Decoration (TD). He was made an Officer of the Order of the Crown of Belgium and also awarded the Belgian Croix de guerre in October. On 2 November 1919 he was promoted to lieutenant-colonel in the Territorial Force Reserve.

He retired from the Territorial Army Reserve in 1929, having reached the age limit.

== Family ==
On 29 October 1904, he married firstly Pearl Marie Coupland, only daughter of John Coupland, and had by her a daughter, Desiree, and two sons, Osric Wilfred, who served in the Indian Army, and Cedric Paul, an architect. His wife died in 1922, and on 3 October 1929 Thesiger remarried Sydney Hilda Hutton-Croft, daughter of George Arthur Hutton-Croft and widow of Maj George Du Plat Taylor, but she died on 16 July 1930. He married thirdly Mary Pudsey, daughter of Reverend F. W. Pudsey, on 27 March 1953. His third wife also died the next year, and Thesiger survived her until 1961.

== Footnote ==
Court offices
Preceded by Percy Cust	Page of Honour; 1884–1890	Succeeded by Hon. Maurice Drummond
