= Rub' al Khali =

Desert in the Arabian Peninsula

- الرُّبْع الْخَالِي
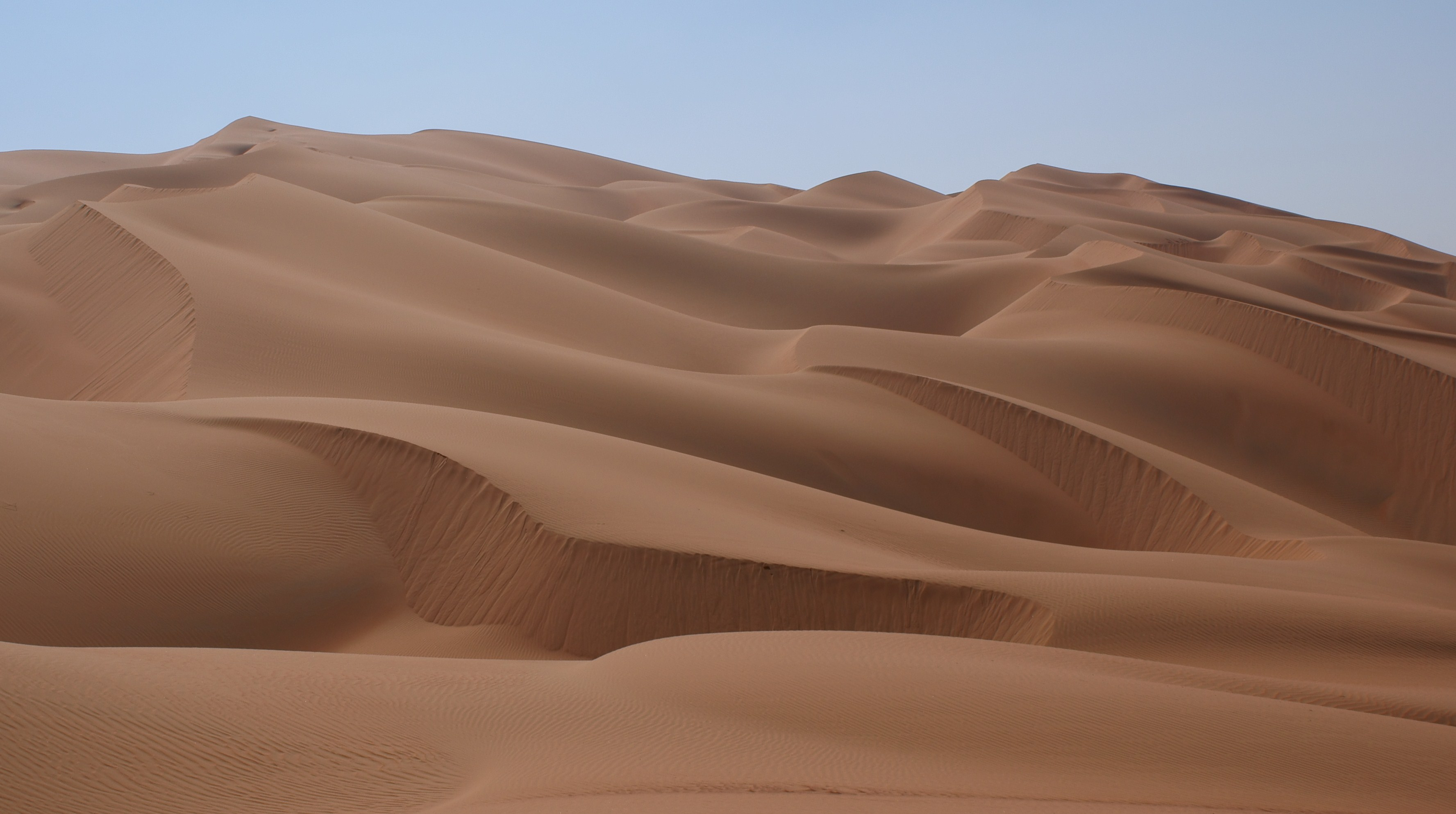
- Sand dunes to the east of Liwa Oasis in the Emirate of Abu Dhabi, near the UAE's border with Saudi Arabia

- Location of the Empty Quarter in the Arabian Peninsula
- Length: 1,000 km (620 mi)
- Width: 500 km (310 mi)
- Area: 650,010 km^{2} (250,970 mi^{2})

Geography
- Countries: Saudi Arabia; Oman; United Arab Emirates; Yemen
- Coordinates: 20°N 50°E

The Rub' al Khali (Note: Other standardized transliterations include: ar-Rubʻ al-Khālī/ar-rubʿ al-ḵālī. The ar- is the assimilated Arabic definite article, al-, which can also be transliterated as al-.) (/ˈrʊb æl ˈkɑːli/; Arabic: ٱلرُّبْع ٱلْخَالِي, lit. 'Empty Quarter', [ar.rʊbʕ‿al.χaːliː]) is a desert encompassing most of the southern third of the Arabian Peninsula. The desert covers some 650,000 km^{2} (250,000 sq mi), including parts of Saudi Arabia, Oman, the United Arab Emirates, and Yemen. It is part of the larger Arabian Desert.

== Description ==
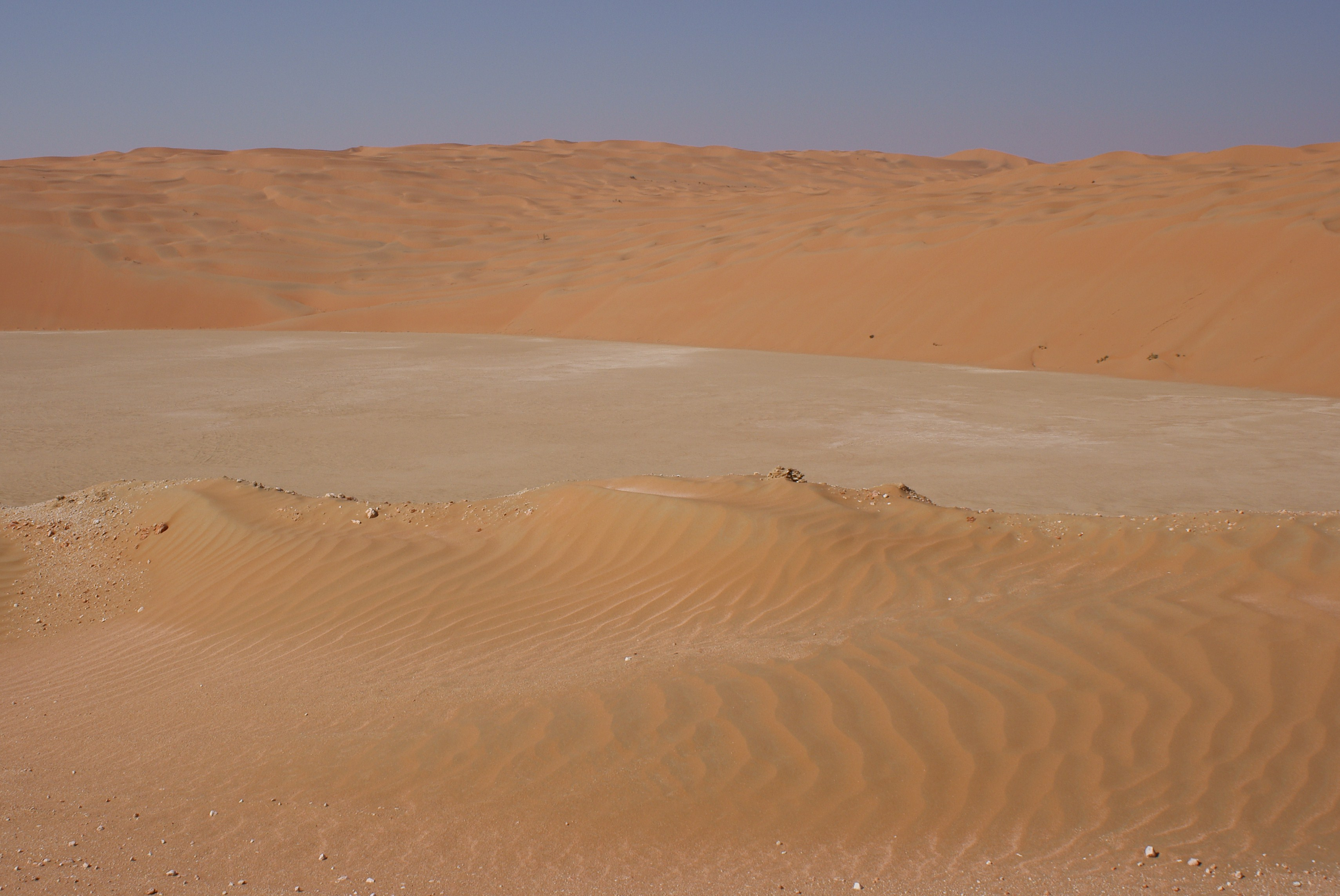
Typical pale gravel plains surrounded by huge sand dunes, as seen in the Emirate of Abu Dhabi

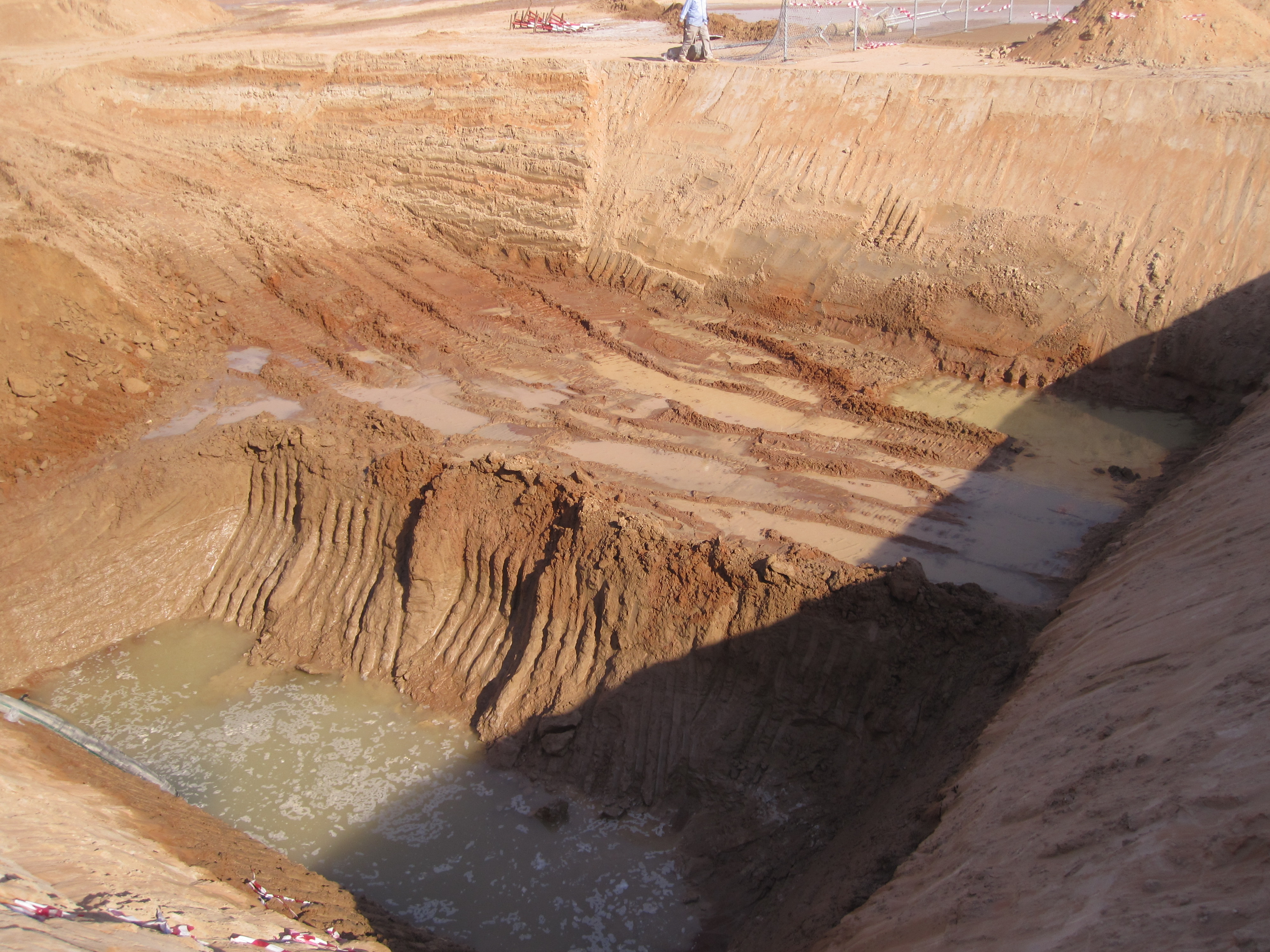
Water found below ground level in the Rub' al-Khali in Shaybah, Saudi Arabia

=== Terrain ===
The desert is 1,000 kilometres (620 miles) long, and 500 kilometres (310 miles) wide, covering the area of longitude 44.5°−56.5°E and latitude 16.5°−23.0°N. It is the largest continuous sand desert on Earth, covering approximately 660,000 square kilometers of the Arabian Peninsula. Its surface elevation varies from 800 metres (2,600 ft) in the southwest to around sea level in the northeast. Most of the terrain is ergs, with sand dunes up to 250 metres (820 ft) high, interspersed with gravel and gypsum plains. The sand is reddish-orange due to the presence of feldspar.

There are also brackish salt flats in some areas, such as the Umm al Samim area on the desert's eastern edge. Ali Al-Naimi reports that the sand dunes do not drift. He goes on to say,

Sand blows off the surface, of course, but the essential shape of the dunes remains intact, probably due to the moisture leaching up into the base of the dunes from the surrounding sabkhas.

==== Lake beds ====
Along the middle length of the desert, there are several raised, hardened areas of calcium carbonate, gypsum, marl, or clay that were once the site of shallow lakes. These lakes existed during periods from 6,000 to 5,000 years ago and 3,000 to 2,000 years ago. The lakes are thought to have formed as a result of "cataclysmic rainfall" similar to present-day monsoon rains and most probably lasted for only a few years. However, lakes in the Mundafen area in the southwest of the Rub' al Khali show evidence of such lakes lasting longer, up to 800 years, from increased runoff from the Tuwaiq Escarpment.

Evidence suggests that the lakes were home to a variety of flora and fauna. Fossil remains indicate the presence of several animal species, such as hippopotamus, water buffalo, and long-horned cattle. The lakes also contained small snails, ostracods, and when conditions were suitable, freshwater clams. Deposits of calcium carbonate and opal phytoliths indicate the presence of plants and algae. There is also evidence of human activity dating from 3,000 to 2,000 years ago, including chipped flint tools, but no actual human remains have been found.

=== Climate ===
The region is classified as "hyper-arid", with annual precipitation generally less than 35 millimetres (1.4 in) a year and temperature around 50 degree celsius.

=== Biodiversity ===
Fauna includes arachnids (e.g. scorpions) and rodents, while plants live throughout the Empty Quarter. The dromedary, or Arabian camel, is an important part of the fauna, with the black camels of Oman being a rare and prized breed. As an ecoregion, the Rub' al Khali falls within the Arabian Desert and East Saharo-Arabian xeric shrublands. The Asiatic cheetah, once widespread in Saudi Arabia, is extirpated.

'Uruq Bani Ma'arid, a protected area located at the western edge of the Empty Quarter, is the desert's most diverse region. It contains several species endemic to the Arabian Peninsula and was designated Saudi Arabia's first-ever Natural World Heritage site in 2023. The flora consists mostly of shrubs and small trees such as Acacias and white saxaul as well as sedges and other grasses. The wildlife includes arachnids, lizards (e.g. the Desert monitor), mammals such as the Desert hedgehog, the Arabian sand gazelle and Rüppell's fox and several species of bird, of which the Lappet-faced vulture and the Short-toed snake eagle also breed in the area. Further, the reserve is home to Saudi Arabia's only population of wild Arabian oryx, which were reintroduced between 1995 and 2013.

=== Oil ===
The Shaybah oil field was discovered in 1968. South Ghawar, discovered in 1948, is the largest oil field in the world and extends southward into the northernmost parts of the Empty Quarter.

=== Transport ===
A road between Oman and Saudi Arabia, through the Empty Quarter, was completed in September 2021. Measuring between 700 and 800 kilometres (430 and 500 miles), it extends from Ibri in Oman to Al-Ahsa in eastern Saudi Arabia. A 160-kilometre (99-mile) stretch of the road is on the Omani side and 580 km (360 miles) is on the Saudi side. The road also goes through the archaeological sites of Bat, Al-Khutm and Al-Ayn in Oman.

== People ==
The inhabitants of the Empty Quarter are members of various local tribes. The Al Murrah tribe claims the largest area, which is mainly based between Al-Ahsa and Najran. The Banu Yam and Banu Hamdan are located in Yemen and the Najran region of southern Saudi Arabia, the Bani Yas are based in the United Arab Emirates. A few road links connect these tribal settlements to the area's water resources and oil production centers.

== History ==
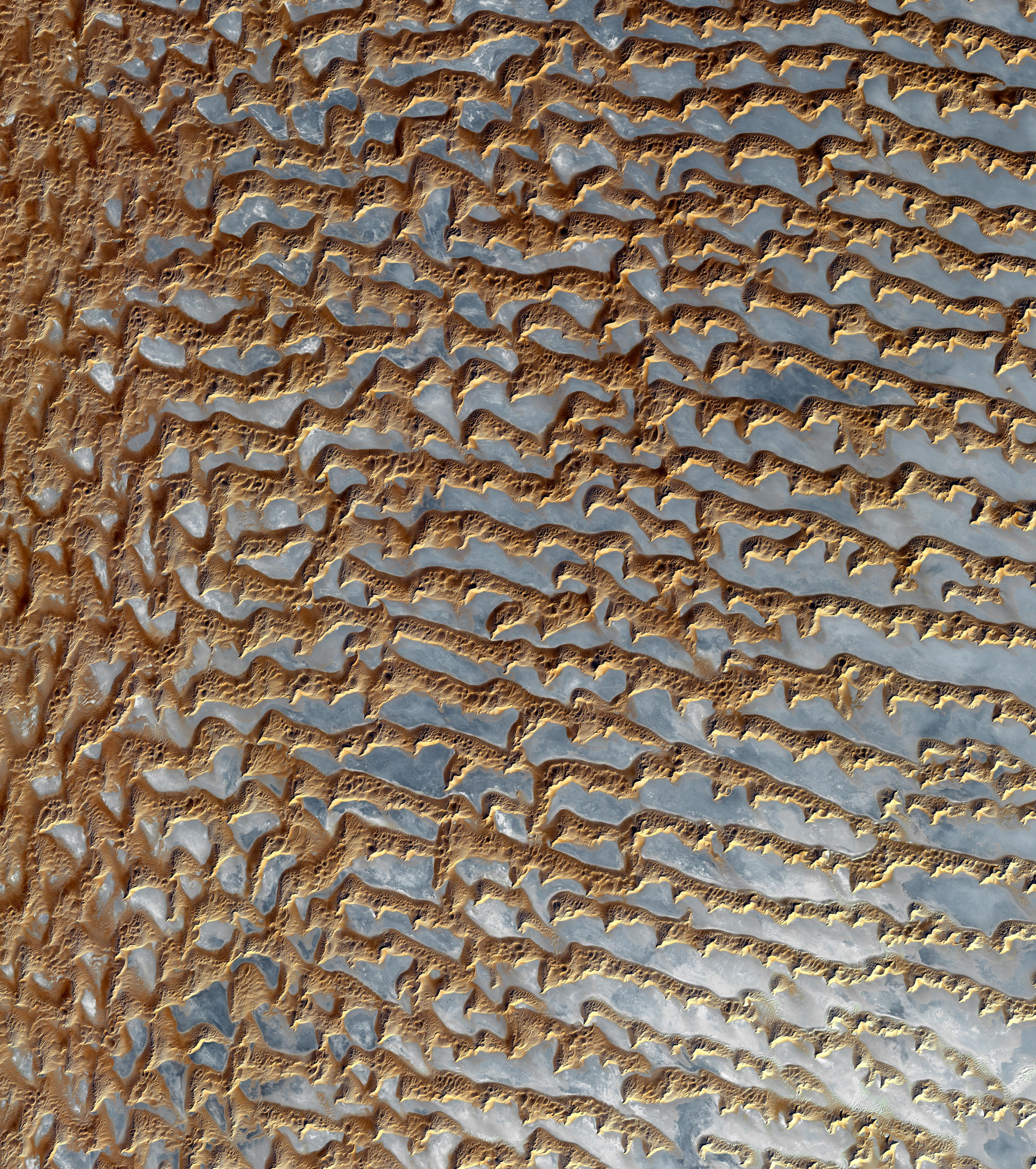
Satellite image of sand dunes in the Empty Quarter

Desertification has increased through recent millennia. Before desertification made the caravan trails leading across the Rub' al Khali difficult, the caravans of the frankincense trade crossed now virtually impassable stretches of land, until about 300 AD. It has been suggested that Ubar or Iram, a lost city, region, or people, depended on such trade. The archaeological remains of Iram include a fortification/administration building, walls, and bases of circular pillars. The traces of camel tracks, unidentifiable on the ground, appear in satellite images.

=== Expeditions ===
The first documented journeys by non-resident explorers were made by British explorers Bertram Thomas and St John Philby in the early 1930s. Between 1946 and 1950, Wilfred Thesiger crossed the area several times and mapped large parts of the Empty Quarter including the mountains of Oman, as described in his 1959 book Arabian Sands.

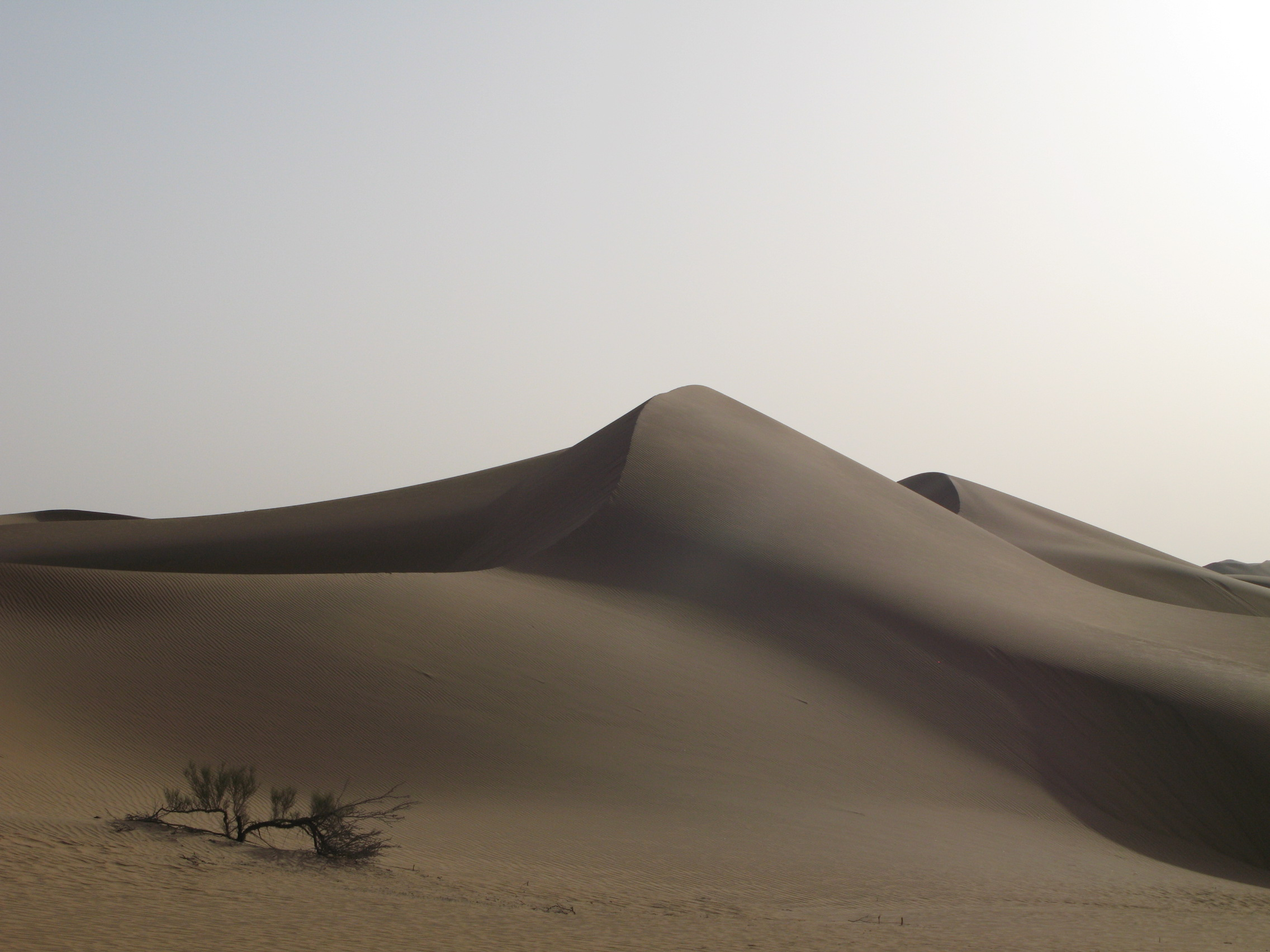
Sand dunes of the desert in Hadhramaut, Yemen

In June 1950 a US Air Force expedition crossed the Rub' al Khali from Dhahran, Saudi Arabia, to central Yemen and back in trucks to collect specimens for the Smithsonian Institution and to test desert survival procedures.

In 1999 Jamie Clarke became the first Westerner to cross the Empty Quarter of Arabia for 50 years. His team of six, guided by three Bedouins, spent 40 days crossing the desert with a caravan of 13 camels.

On 25 February 2006 a scientific excursion organized by the Saudi Geological Survey began to explore the Empty Quarter. The expedition consisted of 89 environmentalists, geologists and scientists from Saudi Arabia and abroad. Various types of fossilized creature as well as meteorites were discovered. The expedition discovered 31 new plant species and plant varieties, as well as 24 species of bird that inhabit the region, which fascinated scientists as to how they have survived under the harsh conditions of the Empty Quarter.

In March 2012 Hajar Ali made the first known crossing of the Rub' al Khali by a woman.

In February 2013 a South African team including Alex Harris, Marco Broccardo and David Joyce became the first people to cross the border close to Oman of the Empty Quarter unsupported and on foot, in a journey that started in Salalah and lasted 40 days, ending in Dubai. The team made use of only three water stops along the journey and pulled a specially designed cart that housed all the supplies necessary for the entire expedition.

In 2013 British adventurer Alistair Humphreys released his first documentary film, Into the Empty Quarter, documenting his walk through the Empty Quarter desert with Leon McCarron.

In 2013, from 18 February to 28 March, South Korean explorer Young-Ho Nam led a team (Agustin Arroyo Bezanilla, Si-Woo Lee) on a crossing through the Empty Quarter on foot from Salalah, Oman, to Liwa Oasis in the UAE Emirate of Abu Dhabi. The crossing was undertaken with permission from the governments of Oman and the UAE. Dewan Ruler's Representative for Western Region, Emirate of Abu Dhabi, recognized it as the world's first on-foot crossing of the Empty Quarter following the border of Oman and ending in UAE.

On 22 December 2018 the first all-female walking expedition, named Her Faces of Change, led by Briton Janey McGill, who was accompanied by the first Omani women in modern times to walk the Oman Empty Quarter, Baida Al Zadjali and Atheer Al Sabri, set off after receiving formal approval from the government of Oman. The team was supported by two cars for supplies driven by Tariq Al Zadjali (Omani) and Mark Vause-Jones (British) and filmmaker Matthew Milan from the United States. The expedition started from Al Hashman in the Dohafar Governate of Oman, crossing through Burkana, Maqshin and Al Sahma in Al Wusta Region, continued through Abu Al Tabool and Um Al Sameem and ended at Ibri fort in the Al Dhahira region of Oman. The total distance walked by the team was 758 km (471 mi) in 28 days, ending the expedition on 18 January 2019.

In 2018 Deidre O'Leary and Kyle Knight crossed the Rub' al Khali from the South (the Saudi-Omani border) to the North (the Saudi-UAE border) on foot. This was the first-known crossing within Saudi Arabia from south to north on foot through the highest sand dunes of the Rub Al' Khali. The pair crossed 300 km (190 mi) in 9 days, 12 hours, and 59 minutes.

In 2020 Italian extreme desert explorer Max Calderan completed a Rub' al Khali exploration on foot for the first time ever from west to east. He crossed 1,100 km (680 mi) in 18 days, crossing the widest area of Rub' al Khali.

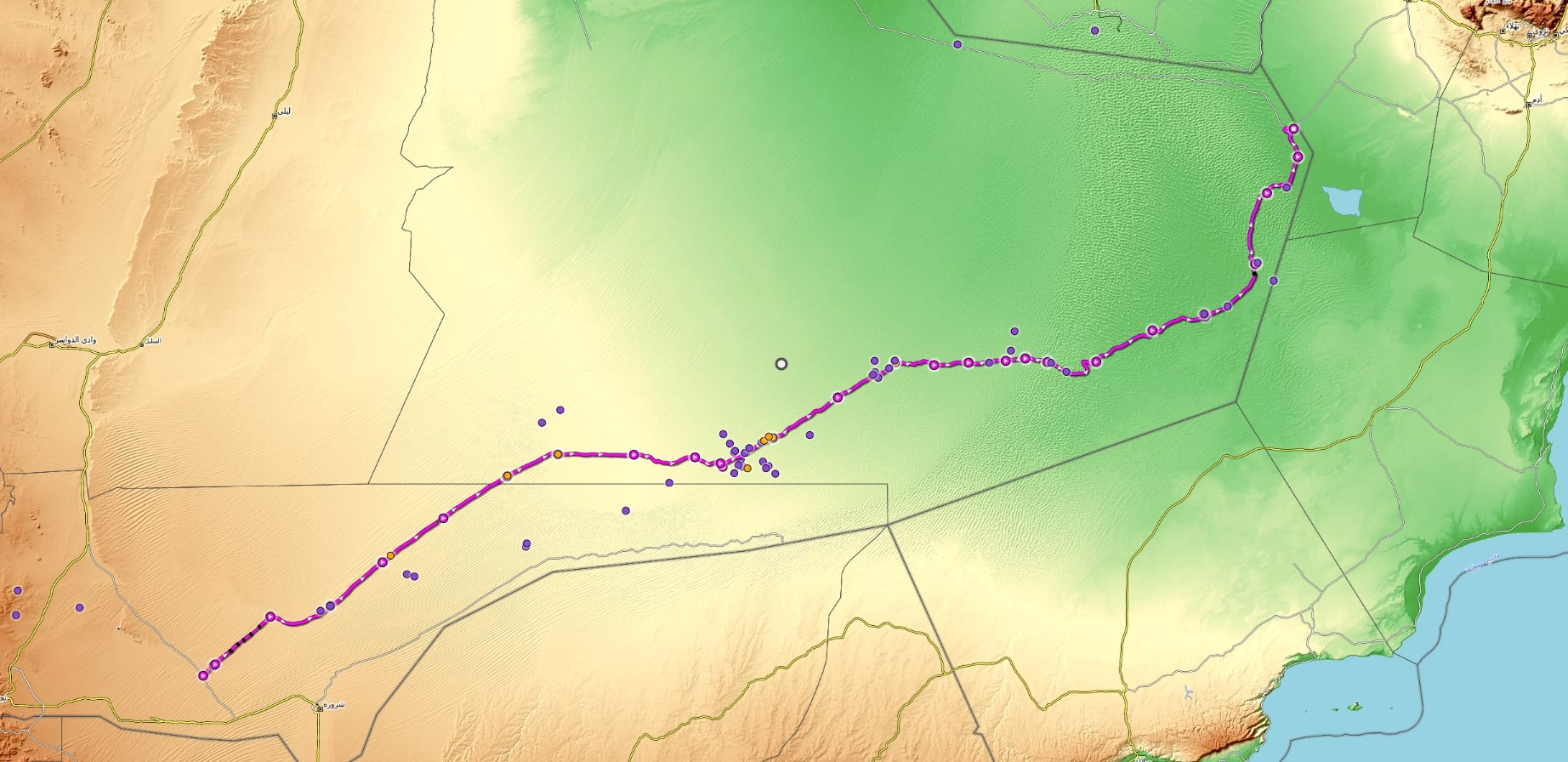
Route of Austrian-German expedition

In 2023, an Austrian-German expedition completed a southwest-to-northeast crossing of the Rub-al-Khali region on the Saudi Arabian side. The route was planned by Austrian Thomas Brandl-Ruttner, leading a team of eight experts in navigation, expedition logistics, and engineering. The team included geo-archaeologist Rudolf Dellmour, who was responsible for scientific documentation. Covering a 1,500-kilometre (930-mile) route through largely unexplored terrain, the team gathered and documented new geological and archaeological findings. Locations that had previously only been studied via satellite imagery were explored on-site for the first time.

In 2025, Gavin Booth MBE and Adam Wilton MBE completed the first self-sufficient foot crossing of the Rub' al Khali, travelling circa 780 kilometres (480 mi) from As Sulayyil to Haradh via Ash Shalfa in 22 days. They hauled all their food, supplies, and water necessary for the journey in self-built carts, without any support or resupply caches.

== Gallery ==
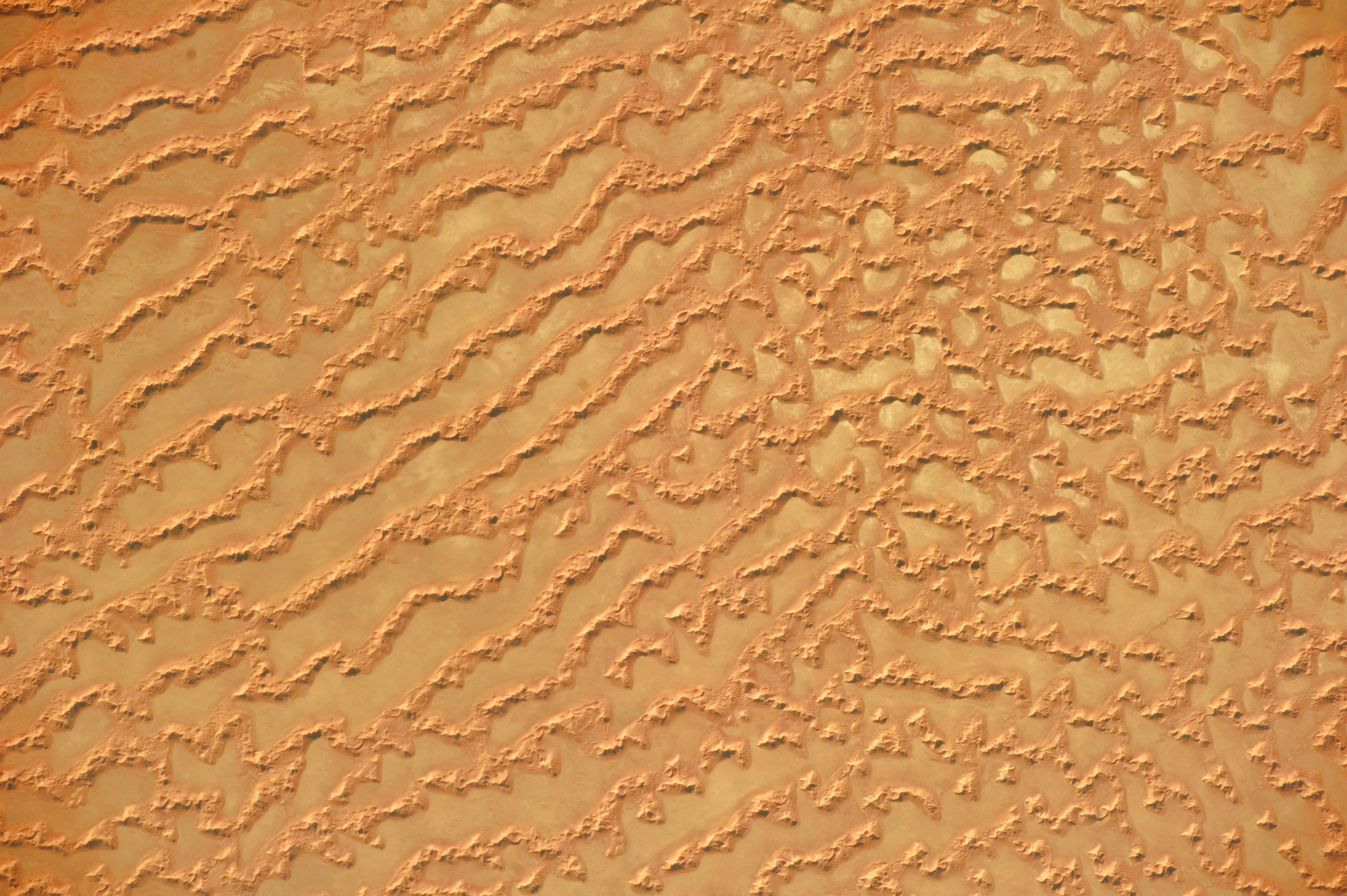
Astronaut photograph highlighting a part of Ar-Rub' al-Khali near its south-eastern margin, in the Wusta Governorate of Oman

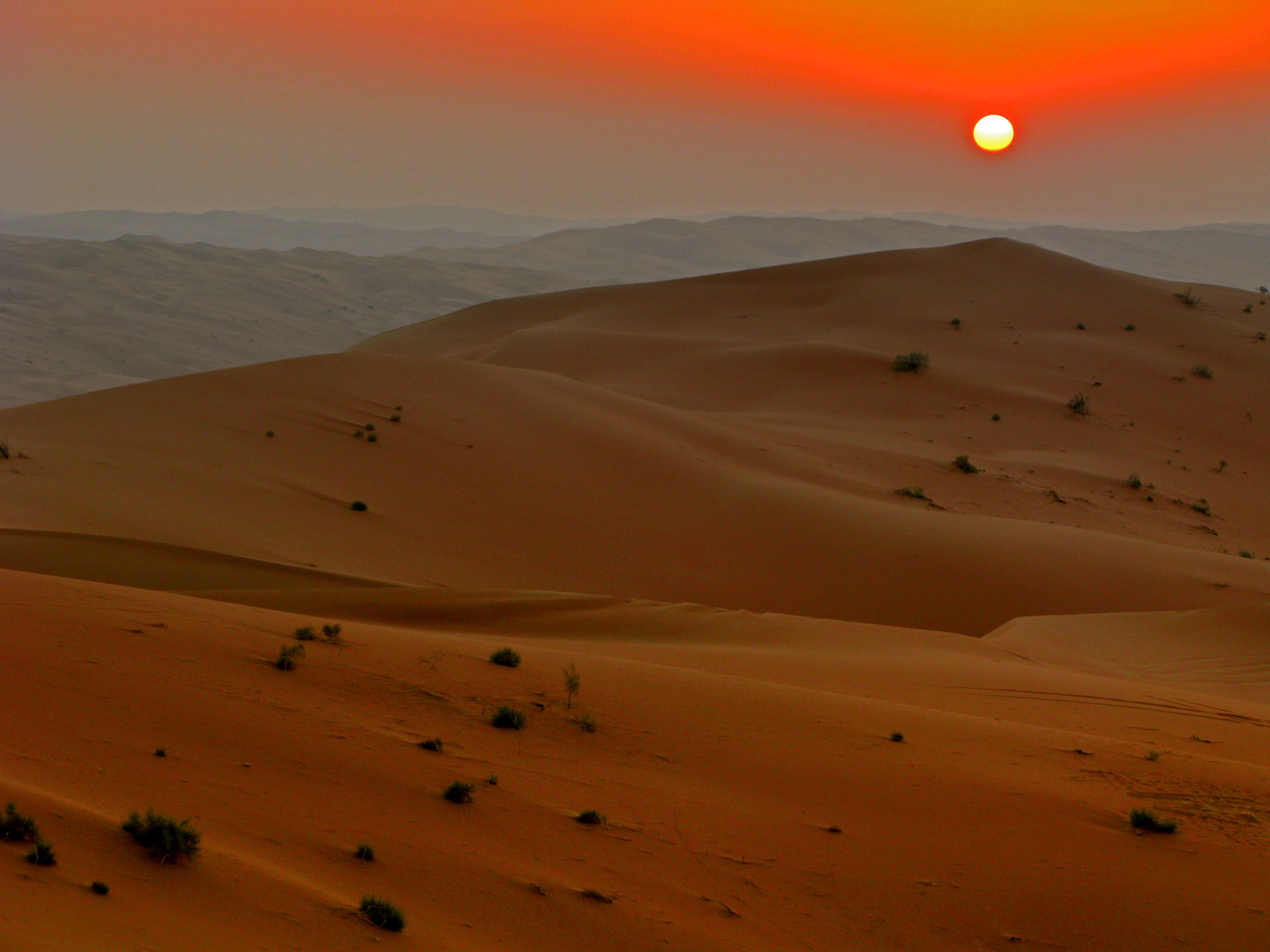
Sunset in Saudi Arabia

Excerpt from Turcici Imperii Descriptio, Abraham Ortelius, 1579

== See also ==
- Ad-Dahna Desert
- Ramlat Khaliya
- Rub' al Khali Basin
- Sharqiya Sands in Oman
