= Wilfred Thesiger =

British military officer, explorer, and writer

Sir Wilfred Thesiger KBE DSO FRAS FRSL FRGS HonFBA
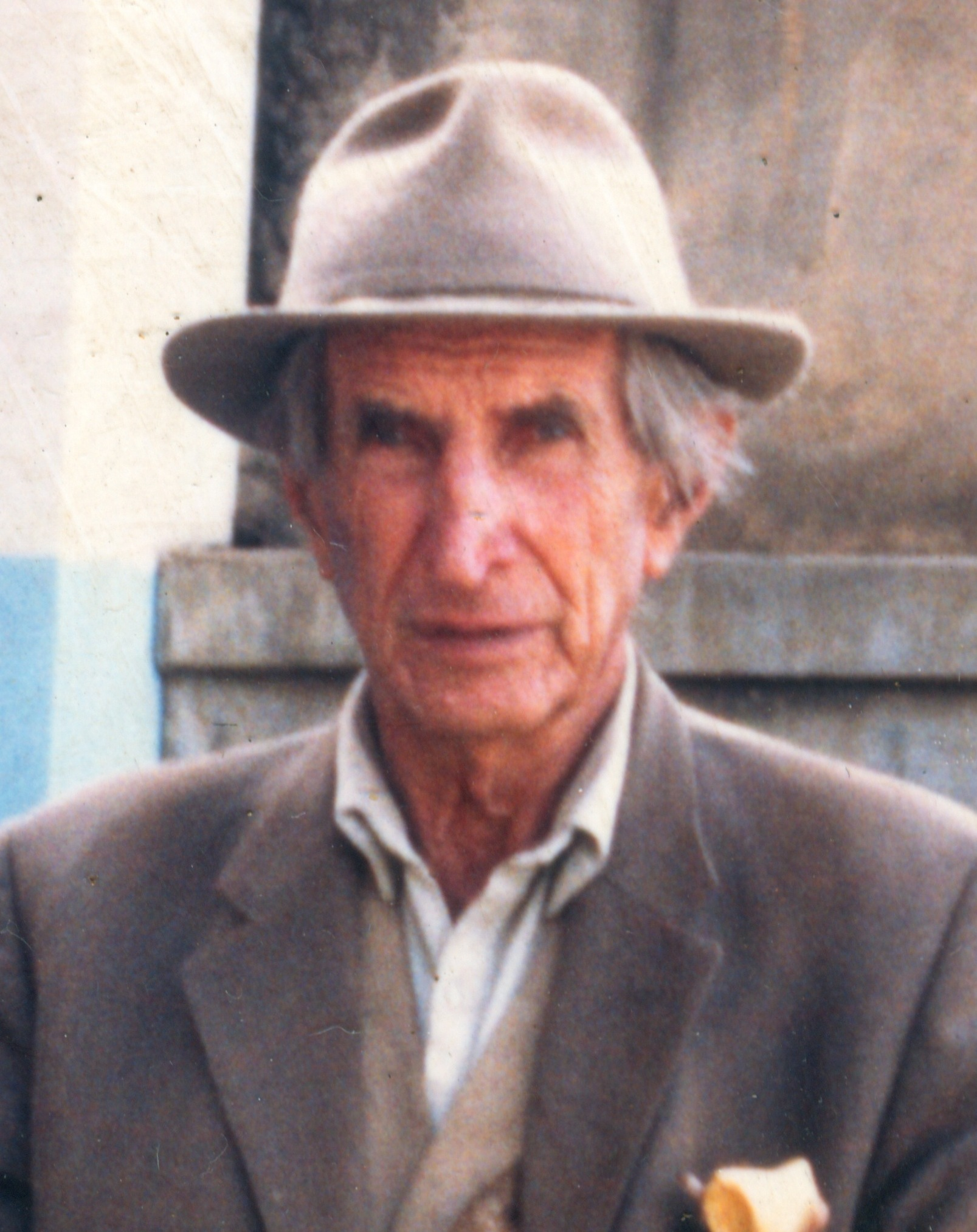
- Thesiger in 1992
- Born: Wilfred Patrick Thesiger; 3 June 1910; Addis Ababa, Ethiopian Empire
- Died: 24 August 2003 (aged 93); Croydon, London, England
- Education: St Aubyn's School; Eton College; Magdalen College, Oxford
- Known for: Exploration, Writing, Photography
- Notable work: Arabian Sands; The Marsh Arabs
- Parents: Wilfred Gilbert Thesiger (father); Kathleen Mary Vigors (mother)
- Relatives: Eric Thesiger (uncle); Frederic Thesiger (uncle)
- Military career
- Allegiance: United Kingdom
- Branch: British Army
- Service years: 1940–1943
- Rank: Major
- Units: Sudan Defence Force; Gideon Force; Special Air Service
- Conflicts: Second World War; North African Campaign

Sir Wilfred Patrick Thesiger (3 June 1910 – 24 August 2003), also known as Mubarak bin Landan (Arabic: مُبَارَك بِن لَنْدَن, the blessed one of London), was a British military officer, explorer, and writer. Thesiger's travel books include Arabian Sands (1959), on his foot and camel crossing of the Empty Quarter of the Arabian Peninsula, and The Marsh Arabs (1964), on his time living with the Marsh Arabs of Iraq.

== Early life ==
Thesiger was born in Addis Ababa, Ethiopia. He was the son of Wilfred Gilbert Thesiger, who was British consul-general in Ethiopia from 1909 to 1919, and his wife Kathleen Mary Vigors. Thesiger's grandfather was Frederic Augustus Thesiger, 2nd Baron Chelmsford. Another Frederic Thesiger, a future viceroy of India and the first Viscount Chelmsford, was an uncle, and the actor Ernest Thesiger was a cousin.

Wilfred Thesiger and his younger brother were the only European children for most of his early years in Addis Ababa. He later recalled how impressed he had been on the day in 1916, when following the overthrow of the Emperor Lij Iyasu, the army of Ras Tafari "armed with swords and spears, some of them carrying rifles, but all of them with shields", followed by bands of wild tribesmen on horses, hurried past the British Legation on their way to give battle to Negus Mikael, the father of Lij Iyasu:

That day made a profound impression on me, implanting a craving for barbaric splendour, for savagery and colour, from which derived a lasting respect for tradition and a readiness to accept a variety of long-established cultures and customs. I grew to feel an increasing resentment towards Western innovations in other lands and a distaste for the dull monotony of our modern world.

== Education ==
Thesiger was educated at St Aubyn's School in Rottingdean, Sussex, followed by Eton College and then Magdalen College, Oxford, where he took a Third in History. Between 1930 and 1933, Thesiger represented Oxford at boxing and later (in 1933) became captain of the Oxford boxing team. He was awarded a boxing Blue for each of the four years that he was at Oxford. Whilst at Oxford, Thesiger was also elected Treasurer of the Oxford University Exploration Club (1931–32).

== Career ==
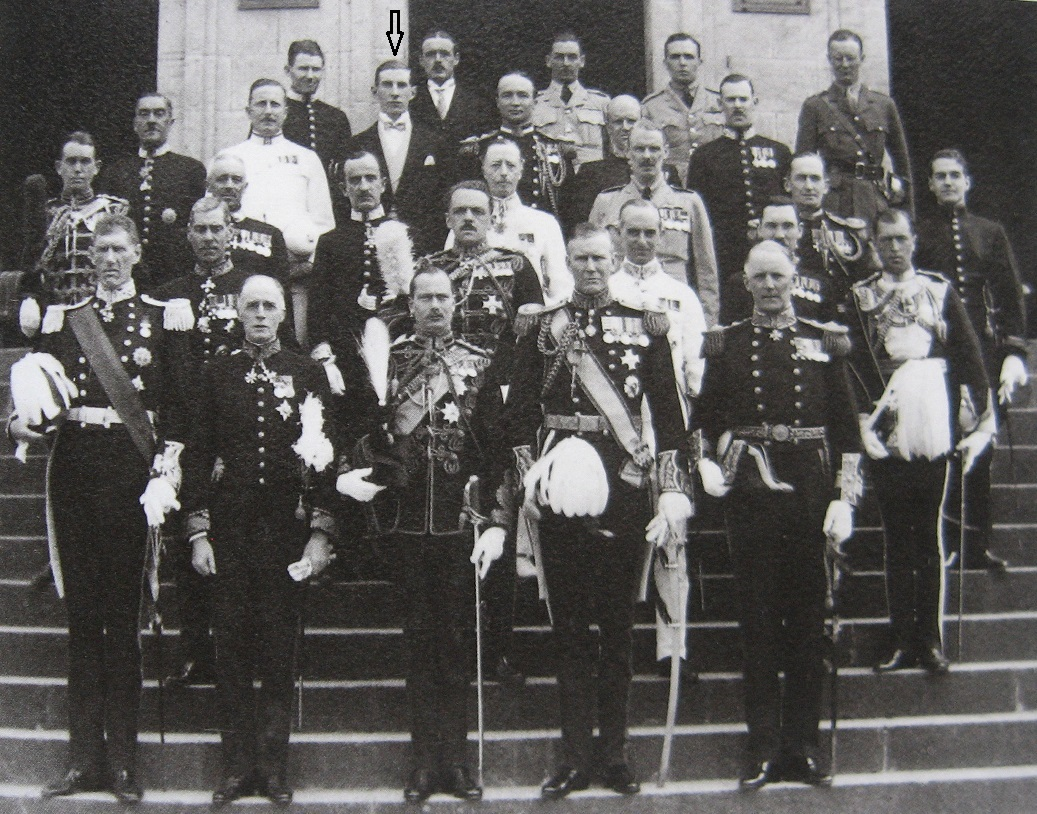
Wilfred Thesiger with the British Delegation in Addis Ababa in 1930

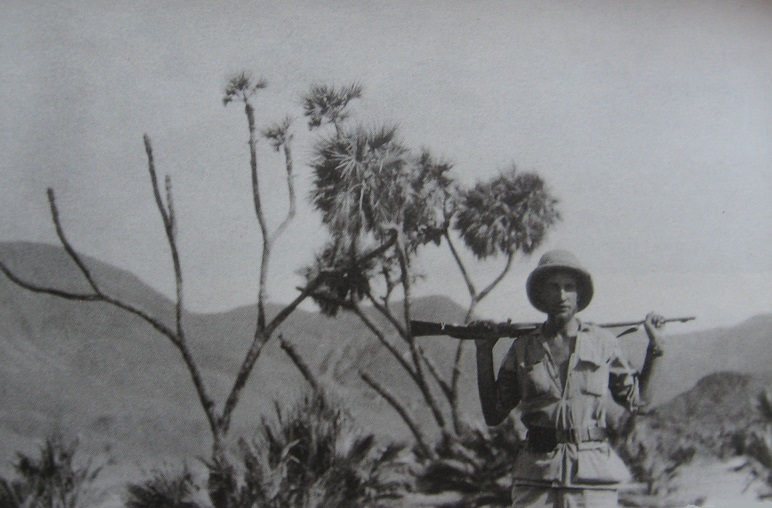
Thesiger in the Horn of Africa in 1934

In 1930 Thesiger returned to Africa, having received a personal invitation from Emperor Haile Selassie to attend his coronation, and joined the Order of the Star of Ethiopia. He returned again in 1933 as the leader of an expedition, funded in part by the Royal Geographical Society, to explore the course of the Awash River. During this expedition, he became one of the first Europeans to enter the Aussa Sultanate and visit Lake Abbe.

Between 1935 and 1940, Thesiger served with the Sudan Political Service, stationed in Darfur and the Upper Nile.

=== Second World War ===
At the outbreak of war, Thesiger joined the Sudan Defence Force, helping to organise the Abyssinian resistance to the occupying Italians. He was appointed a Companion of the Distinguished Service Order (DSO) for capturing Agibar and its garrison of 2,500 Italian soldiers.

He later served with the Special Operations Executive in Syria and the Special Air Service during the North African Campaign, attaining the rank of Major. From 1943 to 1945 he acted as political adviser to Crown Prince Asfa Wossen of Ethiopia.

=== Travels ===
After the Second World War, Thesiger travelled across Arabia, lived for some years in the marshes of Iraq, and then travelled in Iran, Kurdistan, French West Africa and Pakistan. He lived for many years in northern Kenya.

He is remembered for his Arabian expeditions. In 1945, an entomologist, O.B. Lean, acting on behalf of the Middle East Anti Locust Unit (MEALU), hired Thesiger to search for locust breeding grounds in southern Arabia. This led to two crossings of the great Arabian desert, the Rub' al Khali or Empty Quarter, and travels in inner Oman. He rode camels in the company of Bedu guides through remote areas that were potentially dangerous on account of tribal tensions and the opposition of local rulers to the presence of foreigners. His first camel expedition began in Salala (Oman) on 13.10.1945 and ended in Tarim (Yemen) on 22.02.1946.

Thesiger's first large desert crossing began in October 1946 when, with his Bedouin companions, he left Salalah in the Dhofar province of Oman and travelled to the Mughshin Oasis. From there, he entered the sands but there was dissent among his party, some of whom were unwilling to travel any farther. Thesiger continued with four members, two from the Rashid and two from the Bait Kathir tribes. He reached the Liwa Oasis in the Emirate of Abu Dhabi in mid-December, visited the town of Abu Dhabi, then crossed into Oman, heading back towards Salalah via Dhofar and ending his journey at Salalah on 23 February 1947.

His second crossing began in December 1947, at Manwakh well in Yemen. The king of Saudi Arabia did not agree to Thesiger entering his territory, and imprisoned Thesiger and his party when they arrived at Sulayil. Soon released, they travelled to the Liwa Oasis and then to Abu Dhabi town, arriving on 14 March 1948. In April, Thesiger visited the Buraimi Oasis, for which the Iraq Petroleum Company (IPC) held an oil concession, which it operated through an associate company, Petroleum Development Oman. Dick Bird, the company's representative, was concerned by Thesiger's attitude towards oil exploration. Thesiger disapproved of the company's activities, believing that the discovery of oil would destroy the Bedouin way of life. However, the need to finance his expeditions led the explorer to accept funding from the oil company in exchange for providing information garnered from his travels.

He is known for two travel books: Arabian Sands (1959), which recounts his travels in the Empty Quarter of Arabia between 1945 and 1950 and describes the vanishing way of life of the Bedu; and The Marsh Arabs (1964), which is an account of the Madan, the indigenous people of the marshlands of southern Iraq. In the latter he recorded information on Madan gender identities, particularly the mustarjil. The latter journey is also covered by his travelling companion, Gavin Maxwell, in A Reed Shaken by the Wind – a Journey through the Unexplored Marshlands of Iraq (Longman, 1957; new edition by Eland in 2003). Thesiger returned to England in the 1990s and was knighted in the 1995 Birthday Honours.

In 1998, he published his travel memoir, Among the Mountains detailing his travels across Afghanistan and Northern Pakistan.

Thesiger took many photographs during his travels and donated his vast collection of 38,000 negatives to the Pitt Rivers Museum, Oxford.

== Reputation ==
Thesiger's reputation in England was built on his travels, writings and military service. Those who met him found him traditional and old fashioned. Among the Arabian people, his reputation was based on their personal knowledge of him as an adventurer. Salim bin Ghabaisha described him, fifty years after their travels together, as "loyal, generous, and afraid of nothing".

== In popular culture ==
In 2008, Majid Abdulrazak, an Emirati film director, produced a film version of Arabian Sands which was self-funded and employed actors from the United Arab Emirates and Oman in most of the major roles.

A documentary about Sir Wilfred was made by producer Les Guthman in 1999, A Life of My Choice.

Thesiger was a guest on the BBC's Desert Island Discs, broadcast on 6 October 1979.

Wilfred Thesiger's role in Ethiopia is mentioned several times in The Desert Scorpions by Hugo Pratt. This comic book series is partially set amidst the Second World War's East African campaign.

Eric Newby mentions his encounter with Wilfred Thesiger at the end of his book A Short Walk in the Hindu Kush, with comments on his personality and expedition preparation.

== Awards ==
- Master of Arts, MA, Oxon
- Commander of the Order of the Star of Ethiopia, CSE 1930
- Companion of the Distinguished Service Order, DSO 1941
- Founder's Medal, Royal Geographical Society, RGS 1948
- Lawrence of Arabia Memorial Medal of the Royal Society for Asian Affairs, 1955
- Livingstone Medal, Royal Scottish Geographical Society, RSGS 1962
- W. H. Heinemann Award 1964
- Royal Society of Literature, RSL 1965
- Burton Memorial Medal, Royal Asiatic Society, RAS 1966
- Honorary DLitt, Leicester 1967
- Commander of the Order of the British Empire, CBE 1968
- Fellow Royal Society of Literature, FRSL 1982
- Honorary Fellow British Academy, FBA 1982
- Honorary DLitt, University of Bath, 1992
- Knight Commander of the Order of the British Empire, KBE 1995
- Abu Dhabi Awards, 2008

== Styles ==
- Mr Wilfred Thesiger (1910–1967)
- Dr Wilfred Thesiger (1967–1968)
- Dr Wilfred Thesiger CBE (1968–1995)
- Sir Wilfred Thesiger KBE (1995–2003)

== Books ==
- A Journey Through the Tihama, the 'Asir, and the Hijaz Mountains
- Arabian Sands (1959)
  - 1985 Penguin; ISBN 0-14-009514-4
- The Marsh Arabs (1964)
  - 2007 Penguin; ISBN 0-14-144208-5, ISBN 978-0-14-144208-2
- The Last Nomad (1979)
  - 1980 – William Collins; ISBN 0-525-93077-9
- The Life of My Choice (1987)
  - 1987 Harpercollins;. ISBN 0-00-637267-8
- Visions of a Nomad (1987)
  - 1987 Collins; ISBN 0-00-217729-3
- My Kenya Days HarperCollins, 1994; ISBN 0-00-255268-X
- Desert, Marsh & Mountain (1995)
- The Danakil Diary: Journeys through Abyssinia, 1930–34 Hammersmith, 1996, ISBN 0-00-638775-6. Contains the diaries he wrote in 1930 when he attended Haille Selassie's coronation, and in 1933–1935 when he explored the Awash valley and encountered the Afar people. Interspersed with letters he wrote to his mother during that period.
- Among the Mountains: Travels Through Asia HarperCollins, (1998); ISBN 0-00-255898-X. This account presents edited portions of journal entries written during trips to remote mountain areas of Afghanistan, Pakistan, and Kurdistan between 1952 and 1965, as well as numerous black-and-white photographs that he took at the time. There is little detail since the book is based on his diary entries. For a better account, read The Life of My Choice.
- Crossing the Sands Motivate Pub Ltd (2000) 176 pp; ISBN 1-86063-028-6. About his journeys in the Empty Quarter and the Arabian Peninsula during the late forties, with photographs.
- My Life and Travels (anthology)
  - 2002 HarperCollins 352 pp;ISBN 0-00-257151-X
  - 2003 Flamingo 320 pp; ISBN 0-00-655212-9
- A Vanished World
  - 2001 W.W. Norton 192 pp; ISBN 0-00-710837-0
  - 2002 W.W. Norton 189 pp, possibly the same as above, collection of photographs; ISBN 0-393-05086-6

== See also ==
- Salim bin Ghabaisha
- Jebel Hafeet

== Sources ==
- Asher, Michael (1994). Thesiger. New York: Viking Press. ISBN 978-0-670837694.
- Asher, Michael (23 August 2003). "Obituary: Sir Wilfred Thesiger". The Guardian.
- Glancy, Jonathan (29 June 2002). "The Profile: Wilfred Thesiger 'Wild at Heart'". The Guardian.
- Maitland, Alexander (2004). Thesiger: A Life in Pictures. London: HarperCollins. ISBN 978-0-002572248.
- Maitland, Alexander (2006). Wilfred Thesiger: The Life of the Great Explorer. London: HarperPress. ISBN 978-0-002556088.
- Thesiger, Wilfred (1987a). The Life of My Choice. London: Collins. ISBN 978-0-002161947.
- Thesiger, Wilfred (1987b). Visions of a Nomad. London: Collins. ISBN 978-0-002177290.
