= Modest (play) =

2023 biographical play by Ellen Brammar

Modest is a 2023 play by Ellen Brammar, with music by Rachel Barnes. A biographical play on the painter Elizabeth Thompson and her poet sister Alice, it includes strong elements of song, drag, music hall and gender nonconformity (the script has the Academicians portrayed by drag kings and the historically cisgender Alice presented as and played by a trans woman).

It premiered at Hull Truck Theatre on 23–27 May 2023 in a production co-directed by Luke Skilbeck and Paul Smith and mounted by the theatre companies Milk Presents and Middle Child. This was followed by a UK tour and from 29 June to 15 July 2023 a run at the Kiln Theatre in London.

== Plot ==
Thompson's The Roll Call finds great success at the Royal Academy Summer Exhibition of 1874, with many calling for her to be the first woman elected a full Royal Academician (and the first female Academician since founder members Angelica Kauffman and Mary Moser in 1768). Her sister Alice and her friends Mary, Frances and Cora hope to capitalise on Elizabeth's success to further their campaign for women's suffrage, but Elizabeth refuses. Though Queen Victoria disapproves of the proto-feminist precedent set by Elizabeth's success, she buys The Roll Call for the Royal Collection, whilst working-class non-binary Bessie from a factory town writes Elizabeth fan letters, hoping to become an artist themselves. Most of the Academicians refuse even to consider Elizabeth's election despite John Everett Millais's efforts to support her and the following year her 28th Regiment at Quatre Bras is placed in the Summer Exhibition's inaccessible Lecture Room, a fate known as 'being blackholed' due to the room's lack of light.

Elizabeth continues to fall out of favour and argues with Alice before reconciling and taking her advice to exhibit outside the academy, though Alice accepts that her own hopes of being appointed Poet Laureate are futile in light of Queen Victoria's misogynist views. Exhibiting outside the RA meets with little or no success but Keeps Elizabeth (married in the meantime) in the public eye. In 1879 Millais puts her up for election as an Associate of the Royal Academy, which he assures her will be a stepping-stone to becoming a full Academician. Fearful of a woman's election, however, Millais' fellow Academicians ensure she loses by two votes while congratulating themselves on being so progressive that they have almost elected a woman to their ranks. Elizabeth withdraws from public life, whilst Bessie ceases to correspond and Elizabeth's friends and Alice resolve to continue the struggle for women's equality in political, literary and artistic life.

== Premiere cast ==
- Emer Dineen - Elizabeth
- Fizz Sinclair - Alice / RA Two
- LJ Parkinson - RA One / Mary
- Isabel Adomakoh Young - RA Three / Frances
- Jacqui Bardelang - Millais / Cora
- Libra Teejay - Bessie / Queen Vic

== Reception ==
One critic referred to its "repetitive scenes ... sporadically interrupted by short and uninspiring songs" and another called some of the songs "strained" but called the work as a whole "distinctive in its acknowledgment of sexism across the centuries" and praised individual performances. Another called the songs "strong", though critiquing the Lean In or girlboss feminism of "Bossy Women Unite", and praised "stonking performances" for saving the show "When its script falters".
