= Listed for the Connaught Rangers =

1878 painting by Elizabeth Thompson

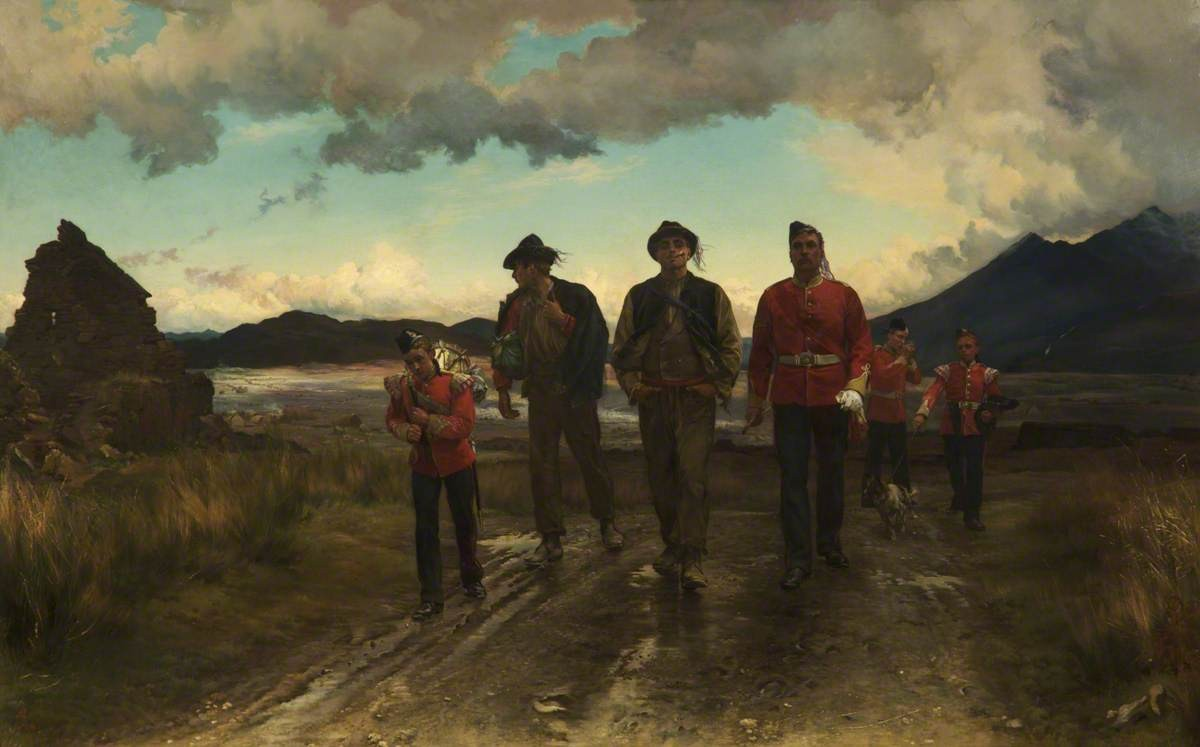
- Artist: Elizabeth Thompson
- Year: 1878
- Type: Oil on canvas, genre painting
- Dimensions: 107 cm × 169.5 cm (42 in × 66.7 in)
- Location: Bury Art Museum, Greater Manchester

Listed for the Connaught Rangers is an oil on canvas genre painting by the British artist Elizabeth Thompson, from 1878. It depicts two young country Irishmen enlisting in the Connaught Rangers. Thompson became known for her scenes of military life, particularly battles. In 1877 she married William Butler, an Irish officer serving in the British Army, and honeymooned with him in the West of Ireland. The painting was displayed at the Royal Academy's Summer Exhibition of 1879 at Burlington House in London. Today it is in the collection of the Bury Art Museum having been acquired in 1937.

== Bibliography ==
- Madeline, Laurence & Willis, Pauline. Women Artists in Paris, 1850-1900. Yale University Press, 2017.
- Morris, Edward. Elizabeth Thompson. Liverpool University Press, 2001.
