= The Defence of Rorke's Drift =

1880 painting by Elizabeth Thompson

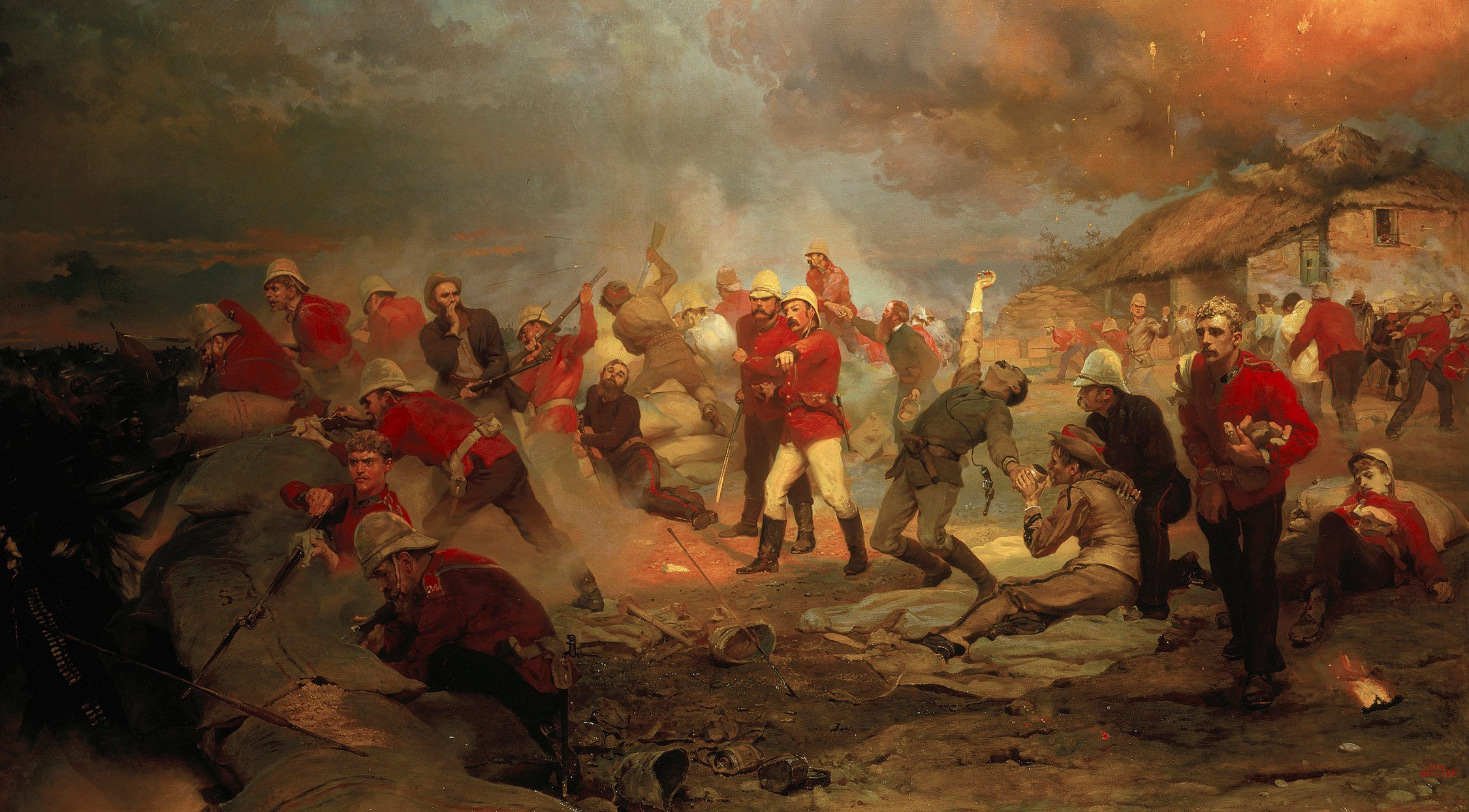
- Artist: Elizabeth Thompson
- Year: 1879
- Medium: oil on canvas
- Dimensions: 120.2 cm × 214 cm (47.3 in × 84 in)
- Location: The Royal Collection

The Defence of Rorke's Drift is an 1880 painting by Elizabeth Thompson, Lady Butler depicting the 1879 Battle of Rorke's Drift which took place during the Anglo-Zulu War of 1877 to 1879. The battle and the men who fought in it were made famous in the 1964 film Zulu.

The Battle of Rorke's Drift caused a wave of patriotic fever in the United Kingdom and the surviving participants, especially the officers, were feted on their return in October 1879, first going to Windsor Castle to meet Queen Victoria before posing for Elizabeth Thompson at Portsmouth where the regiment was quartered. Here they gave her their eye-witness accounts and put on a representation of the battle for her "dressed in the uniforms they wore on that dreadful night …the result was that I reproduced the event as nearly to the life as possible". Butler wrote that she had 'managed to show, in that scuffle, all the V.C.'s and other conspicuous actors in the drama." Completed in 1880 the painting is now in the Royal Collection.

Among those depicted are Lieutenants John Chard VC (in the light breeches) and Gonville Bromhead VC (centre) commanding the battle with behind them in the middle distance, distinguished by his red beard, Padre George Smith hands out ammunition from his hat. Private Frederick Hitch VC (right, standing) also is shown handing out ammunition while Surgeon James Henry Reynolds VC and Storekeeper Byrne tend to the wounded Corporal Scammell (Reynolds kneeling; Byrne falling, shot). Corporal Ferdinand Schiess VC is possibly shown at centre background at the barricade just to left of Chard and Bromhead in Natal Native Contingent uniform.

The Defence of Rorke's Drift was exhibited at the Royal Academy in 1880.

In 2013, Private David Jenkins (bottom left in the painting) was confirmed as having fought in the battle from Lady Butler's sketch of him taken at Portsmouth among the other survivors; his name has subsequently been added to the roll of those who fought at Rorke's Drift.
