= Ferdinand Schiess =

Recipient of the Victoria Cross (1856–1884)

Christian Ferdinand Schiess VC
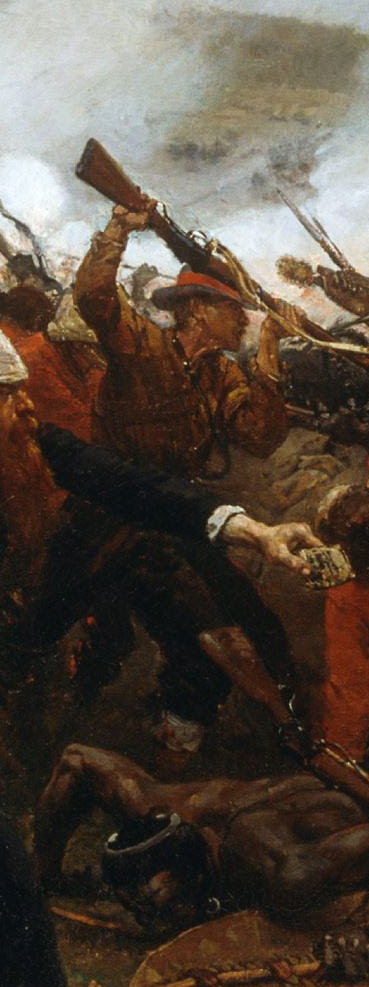
- Detail from Alphonse de Neuville's 1880 "The Defense of Roarke's Drift" reputedly depicting Ferdinand Schiess.
- Born: 7 April 1856; Burgdorf, Switzerland
- Died: 14 December 1884 (aged 28); South Atlantic
- Burial place: Buried at sea
- Military career
- Allegiance: France; United Kingdom: Colony of Natal
- Branch: French Army; British Army
- Service years: 1870–1875/1876 (France); 1877–1879 (United Kingdom)
- Rank: Corporal
- Units: Armée de l'Est; 2nd/3rd Natal Native Contingent
- Conflicts: Franco-Prussian War; 9th Xhosa War; Anglo-Zulu War: Battle of Rorke's Drift
- Awards: Victoria Cross

Christian Ferdinand Schiess VC (7 April 1856 – 14 December 1884) was a Swiss recipient of the Victoria Cross, the highest and most prestigious award for gallantry in the face of the enemy that can be awarded to British and Commonwealth forces. He died of exposure after a period of severe poverty at the age of 28.

== Biography ==
Schiess was born in Burgdorf, Switzerland on 7 April 1856, and spent time in an orphanage after his parents died. In 1870 he joined the French Army and fought in the Franco-Prussian War. Schiess later served in the Armée de l'Est and thus was interned in his home country when it surrendered there. He went to South Africa in 1877 and volunteered for the last Xhosa War. When the Anglo-Zulu War began the 22-year-old veteran was made a corporal in the Natal Native Contingent of the British Army in South Africa.

On 22 January 1879, at Rorke's Drift, Natal, Corporal Schiess, in spite of suffering from bad blisters on his foot caused by ill fitting boots, displayed great gallantry when the garrison had retired to the inner line of defence and the Zulus had occupied the wall of mealie bags which had been abandoned. He crept along the wall in order to dislodge a Zulu warrior and succeeded in killing him and two others before returning to the inner defences.

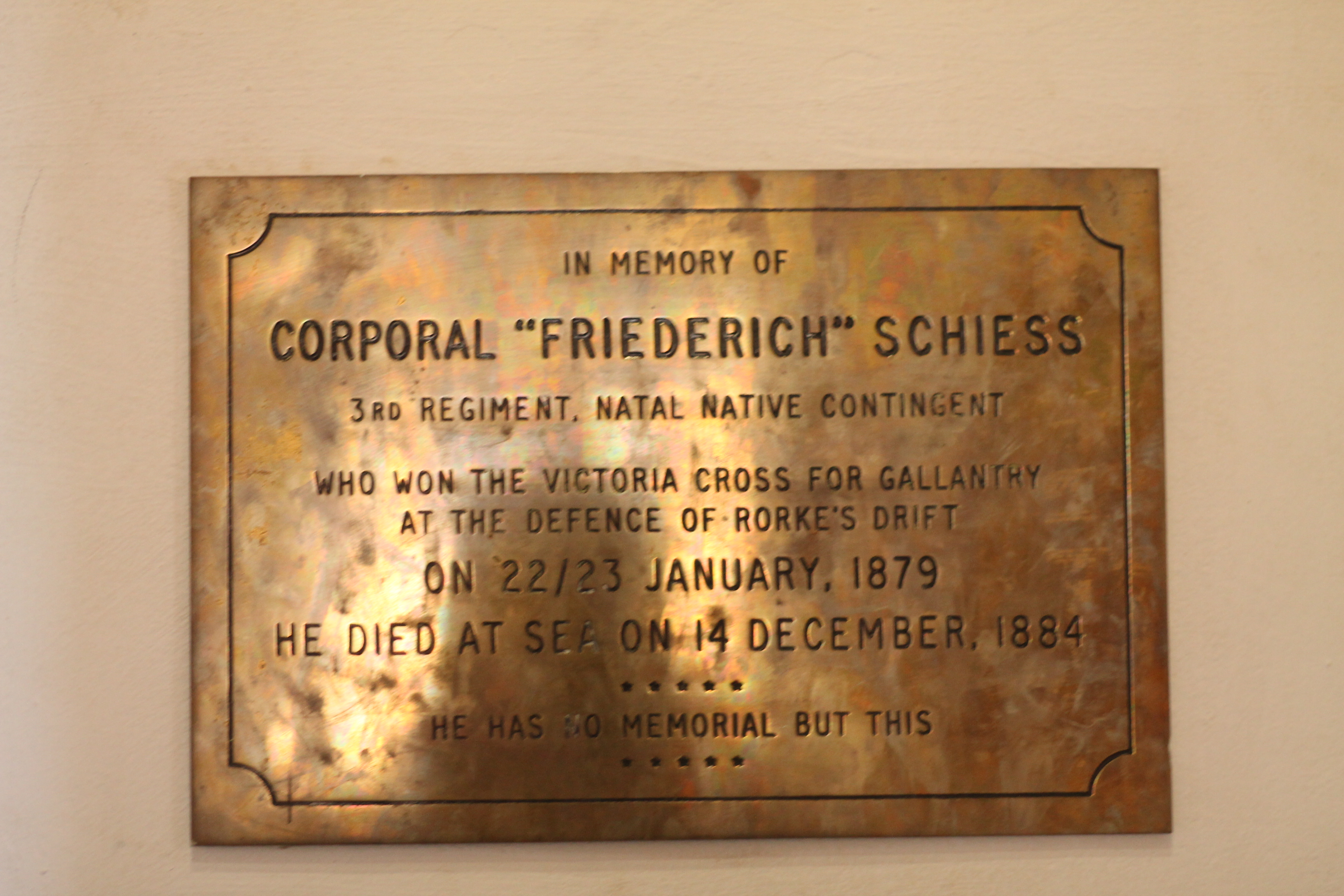
Memorial plaque to Friederich Schiess at the Rorke's Drift Museum, Natal.

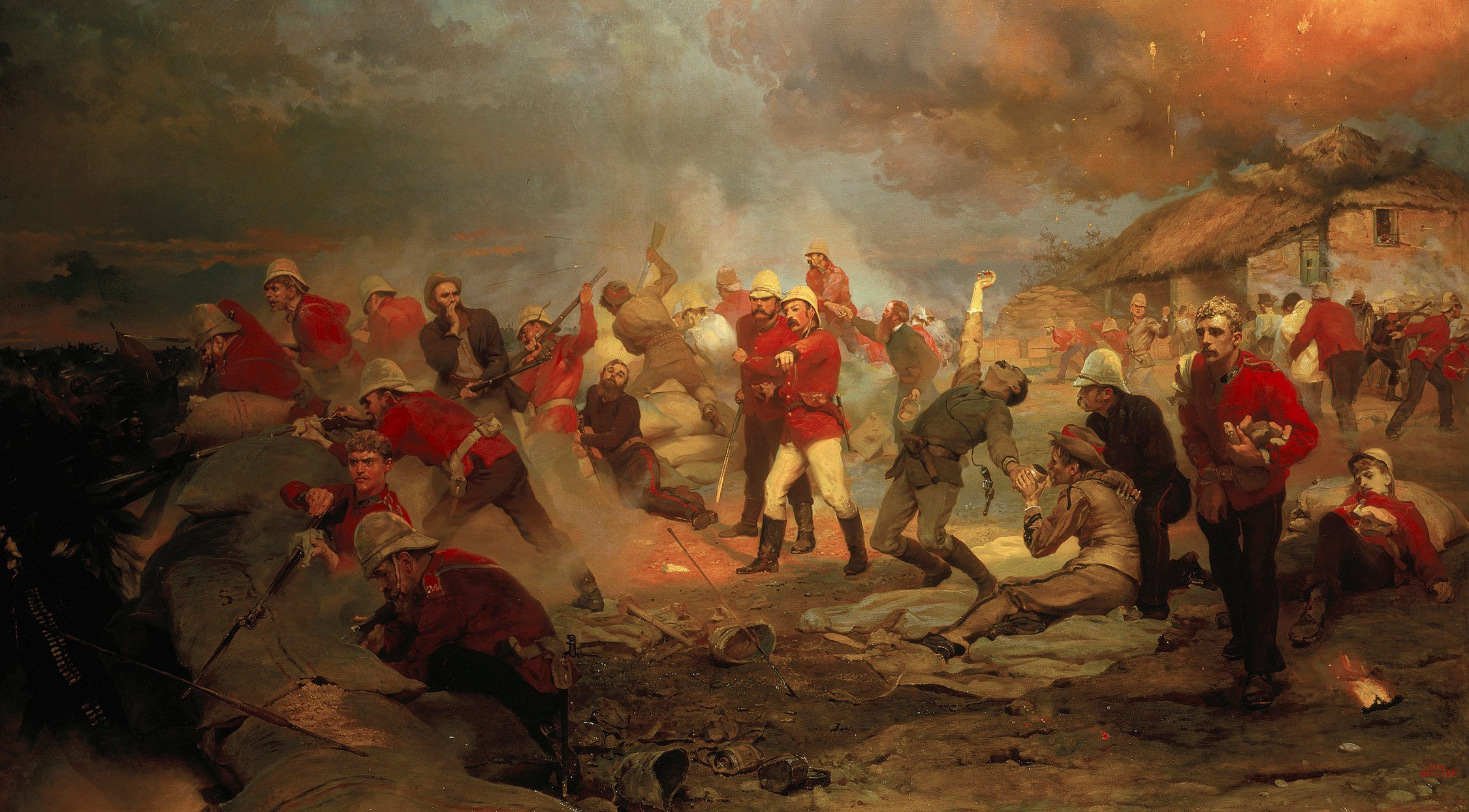
Lady Butler's version of the Battle of Rorke's Drift.

In 1880 he was awarded the Victoria Cross by General Sir Garnet Wolseley for his services at Rorke's Drift. Schiess was the first man serving with a locally raised native unit to receive the Victoria Cross, the "British-only" rule being broken under political pressure, also being the first Swiss national to do so.

After the volunteer forces were disbanded he failed to find work, even from British authorities. He briefly went to India but eventually returned to South Africa. In 1884, he was found on the streets of Cape Town suffering from exposure and malnutrition. The Royal Navy found him, gave him food, and offered him a passage to England on board the Serapis. He accepted, but became ill during the voyage and died. His remains were buried at sea at approximately 13°00′S 07°24′W.

It is unknown if there was a portrait of Corporal Schiess. According to some, in Lady Butler's painting The Defence of Rorke's Drift he is shown lying at left against the mealie bags.

== Victoria Cross ==
The citation for Schiess's Victoria Cross was given as:

For conspicuous gallantry in the defence of Rorke's Drift Post on the night of the 22nd January, 1879, when, in spite of his having been wounded in the foot a few days previously, he greatly distinguished himself when the Garrison were repulsing, with the bayonet, a series of desperate assaults made by the Zulus, and displayed great activity and devoted gallantry throughout the defence. On one occasion when the Garrison had retired to the inner line of defence, and the Zulus occupied the wall of mealie bags which had been abandoned, he crept along the wall, without any order, to dislodge a Zulu who was shooting better than usual and succeeded in killing him, and two others, before he, the Corporal, returned to the inner defence.

His Victoria Cross is displayed at the National Army Museum in Chelsea.

== Recognition in Switzerland ==
For many years, Schiess's story was almost unknown in his home country. However, in recent years he has been remembered by the Museum of the Swiss Abroad at the Château de Penthes in Geneva and by the Swiss branch of the Royal British Legion.

== Film portrayal ==
In the 1964 film Zulu, Dickie Owen portrays Schiess as a much older soldier than he was during the Battle of Rorke's Drift.
