= Balaclava (painting) =

1876 painting by Elizabeth Thompson

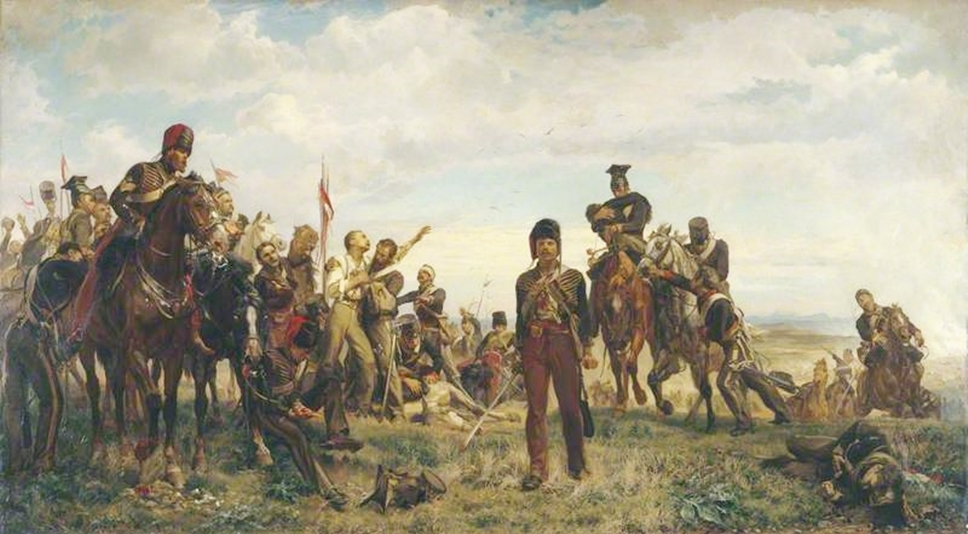
- Artist: Elizabeth Thompson
- Year: 1876
- Type: Oil on canvas, history painting
- Dimensions: 103.4 cm × 187.5 cm (40.7 in × 73.8 in)
- Location: Manchester Art Gallery, Manchester

Balaclava is an oil painting on canvas by the British artist Elizabeth Thompson, from 1876. It depicts the aftermath of the Charge of the Light Brigade at the Battle of Balaclava, on 25 October 1854, during the Crimean War. A misunderstood order led to the British light cavalry charging Russian artillery batteries, suffering heavy losses.

The picture was part of a loose trilogy of Crimean scenes she produced beginning with her breakthrough 'The Roll Call in 1874 and The Return from Inkerman (1877). It was exhibited at the Fine Art Society in Bond Street with lines from Tennyson's poem about the charge. Today the painting is in the Manchester Art Gallery, having been acquired in 1898.

== Bibliography ==
- Kestner, Joseph A. Masculinities in Victorian Painting. Scolar Press, 1985.
- Lalumia, Matthew Paul. Realism and Politics in Victorian Art of the Crimean War. UMI Research Press, 1984.
- Morris, Edward. Elizabeth Thompson. Liverpool University Press, 2001.
- Usherwood, Paul & Spencer-Smith, Jenny. Lady Butler, Battle Artist, 1846-1933. Sutton, 1987.
