= Scotland Forever! =

1881 painting by Elizabeth Thompson

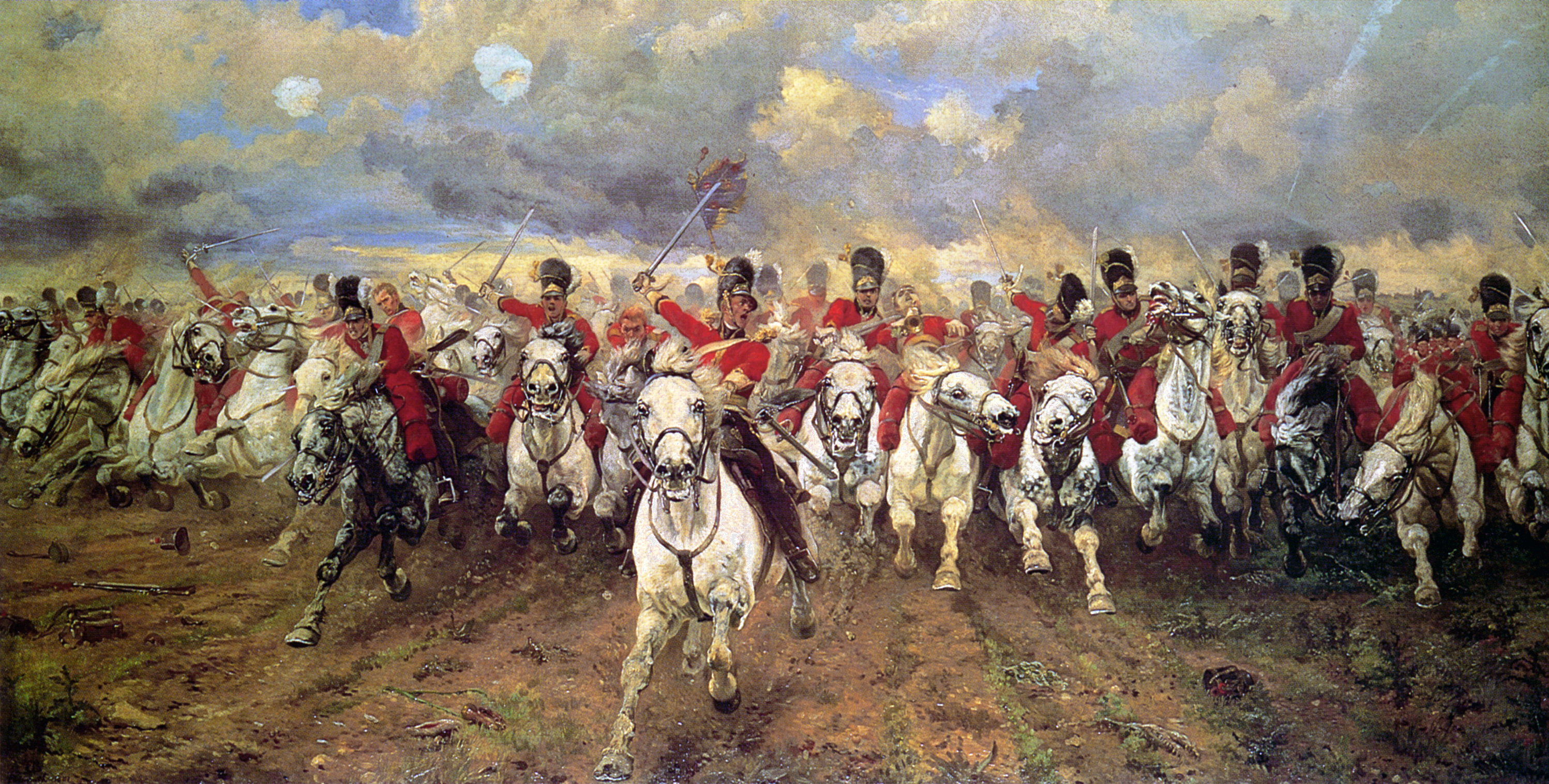
- Scotland Forever!
- Artist: Elizabeth Butler
- Year: 1881
- Medium: Oil on canvas
- Movement: Military art
- Subject: Royal Scots Greys at the Battle of Waterloo
- Dimensions: 101.6 cm × 194.3 cm (40.0 in × 76.5 in)
- Location: Leeds Art Gallery, Leeds
- Website: www.leedsartgallery.co.uk/gallery/listings/l0081.php

Scotland Forever! is an 1881 oil painting by Elizabeth Butler depicting the start of the charge of the Royal Scots Greys, a Scottish heavy cavalry regiment that charged with other British heavy cavalry at the Battle of Waterloo in 1815.

The painting has been reproduced many times and is considered an iconic representation of the battle itself, and of heroism more generally.

== Battle ==
On the morning of 18 June 1815 on the field at the Waterloo, The Scots Greys started the day in the third line of the Duke of Wellington's left flank.

Under the command of Lieutenant-Colonel James Inglis Hamilton, who in turn reported to Maj Gen. William Ponsonby KCB in the so-called Union Brigade, because it consisted of regiments from England (Royal Dragoons), Scotland (Greys) and Ireland (6th Dragoons).

Just after 1:30pm, with the French infantry advancing and threatening to break the British centre, The Earl of Uxbridge ordered the Household Brigade and the Union Brigades to attack the French infantry of D'Erlon's I Corps.

Lt Col Hamilton witnessed the 92nd Highlanders Regiment beginning to falter and on his own initiative, ordered the Scots Greys forward at the walk because the ground was broken and uneven. The arrival of the Scots Greys helped to rally the 92nd Highlanders, who turned to attack the French.

Although the Scots Greys and the Union Brigade may very well have saved the day, they suffered heavy casualties and were continuously harried by French cavalry. They eventually reformed on the left, supporting the rest of the line as best they could with rifle fire.

By the time they retreated to the safety of the British lines, the Scots Greys suffered 104 dead and 97 wounded and lost 228 of the 416 horses.

Although not intended to be a portrait - the lead soldier is likely Lt Col Hamilton who led the first charge but was killed in the second smaller charge, or Captain Edward Cheney who had five horses shot from under him during the battle - one on each charge - and who led the third, fourth and fifth charge. For these heroics, Cheney was given a field promotion to Brevet Colonel after the death his superiors, LtCol Hamilton and Gen. Ponsonby.

== Painting ==
Butler had developed a reputation for her military pictures after the favourable reception of her earlier painting The Roll Call of 1874, on a subject from the Crimean War, and her 1879 painting Remnants of an Army, on the 1842 retreat from Kabul. She was inspired to paint Scotland Forever! as a response to the aesthetic paintings that she saw — and intensely disliked — on a visit to the Grosvenor Gallery.

Although Butler had never observed a battle, she was permitted to watch her husband - Gen Sir William Butler's regiment during training maneuvers, positioning herself in front of charging horses in order to observe their movement.

The horses which dominate the picture are heavy grey mounts, allegedly used by the regiment throughout its history until mechanisation, although at Waterloo (and earlier), it seems they had brown horses like the other heavy cavalry regiments. The name "greys" is derived from the grey uniforms the regiment wore in the early 18th century. The bearskin caps were covered during the actual battle by black oilskin covers.

The title comes from the battle cry of the soldiers—the Greys called "Now, my boys, Scotland forever!" as they charged.

The painting was exhibited at the Egyptian Hall in Piccadilly in 1881. In 1888 Colonel Thomas Walter Harding donated the painting to Leeds Art Gallery.

== Cultural references ==
The scene was used as an inspiration for the depiction of the same charge in the 1970 film Waterloo.

== See also ==
- Dawn of Waterloo, a 1895 prequel painting by the artist
