= Dickie Owen =

British actor (1927–2015)

- Born: 26 March 1927
- Died: 7 April 2015 (aged 88)
- Occupation: Actor
- Years active: 1959–1968

Dickie Owen (26 March 1927 – 7 April 2015) was a British actor primarily known for his roles in Zulu, The Curse of the Mummy's Tomb and The Mummy's Shroud.

Owen largely retired from acting in the 1970s and worked as a radio dispatcher for a cab company. After a long public absence, he was interviewed in 2011 about his experiences making Zulu.

== Filmography ==
=== Films ===
Year	Title	Role	Notes
1959	A Touch of Larceny	Second Policeman	Uncredited
1960	Hell Is a City	Bragg	
1960	Watch Your Stern	Sailor #6	
1960	The Criminal	1st Man in Prison	Uncredited
1962	Playback	Waiter #2	
1964	Zulu	Corporal Christian Ferdinand Schiess	
1964	The Curse of the Mummy's Tomb	Ra-Antef	
1966	Three Hats for Lisa	Policeman	
1967	The Mummy's Shroud	Prem	
1968	Chitty Chitty Bang Bang	Major Domo	Uncredited, (final film role)

Year	Title	Role	Notes
1960	Knight Errant Limited	Bates	1 episode
1961	Girl on a Roof	1st Constable	TV movie
1961	The Grand Junction Case	Parriss	Short
1962	The Saint	Cab Driver	1 episode
1963	The Plane Makers	Hiram Thomas / Joe Carter	2 episodes
1963–1964	Love Story	Dickie Benz / Civvie#1	2 episodes
1964	Espionage	2nd Surveillance man	1 episode
1964	HMS Paradise	Sid	1 episode
1964	Richard Whittington Esquire	Bragg	TV movie
1965	The Wednesday Play	Big Al / Keeper Bent	3 episodes
1966	Mrs Thursday	Security Officer	1 episode
1967	Orlando	Tim Turtle	6 episodes
1967	Man in a Suitcase	Sergeant Jones	1 episode
1968	Ukridge	Battling Billson	2 episodes
1968	Z-Cars	Syd Maggs	1 episode
