= 28th Regiment at Quatre Bras (painting) =

1875 painting by Elizabeth Thompson

The 28th Regiment at Quatre Bras
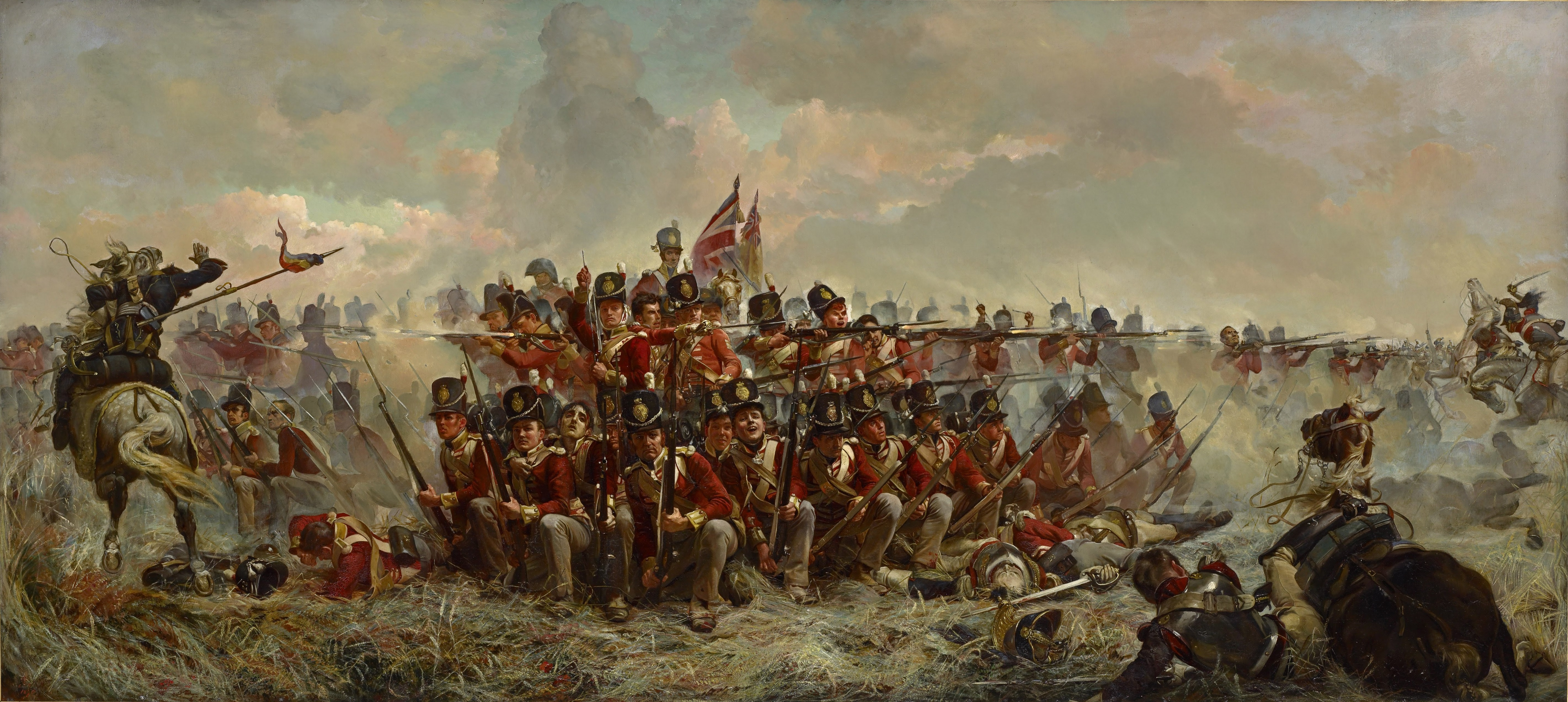
- Artist: Elizabeth Thompson
- Year: 1875
- Medium: oil painting
- Dimensions: 97.2 cm × 216.2 cm (38.3 in × 85.1 in)
- Location: National Gallery of Victoria, Melbourne

The 28th Regiment at Quatre Bras is an oil painting on canvas from 1875, painted by Elizabeth Thompson. She became better known as Lady Butler after her marriage to William Butler in 1877. The painting is 97.2 centimeters (38.3 in) high and 216.2 centimeters (85.1 in) wide. It is in the National Gallery of Victoria, Melbourne.

== Subject ==
Thompson based the painting on the account of the battle in a book written by Captain William Siborne, the History of the War in France and Belgium in 1815, first published in 1844. The painting portrays the 28th (North Gloucestershire) Regiment of Foot, of the British Army, on 16 June 1815, at the Battle of Quatre Bras. The battle, part of the Waterloo Campaign of the Hundred Days, was just two days prior to the Battle of Waterloo. The regiment held off attacks from French cavalry at Quatre Bras. Thompson shows the regiment formed in a square in a field of rye, withstanding attacks, at approximately 17:00, from lancers and cuirassiers led by Marshal Ney.

== Preparation for painting ==
Thompson went to great lengths to create models for her work. In July 1874, she arranged for 300 soldiers from the Royal Engineers to pose in a reconstruction of the square formation, and to fire their rifles, to recreate the smoky scene. Several of the soldiers also modelled in Thompson's studio. Thompson observed horses at Sanger's Circus and the Horse Guards riding school, as models for the French cavalry. She also arranged for a group of children to trample down a field of rye in Henley-on-Thames, to recreate the setting.

=== Headwear and flag error ===
She had copies of the historic uniforms made by a government manufacturer in Pimlico. However, the shako she depicts the regiment wearing is incorrect. Whilst nearly all Regiments of Foot in the British Army had adopted the false-fronted Belgic shako since 1812, so the replica uniforms were correct for a standard line regiment, the 28th Regiment continued to wear the older stovepipe shakos during the Hundred Days campaign. The older headwear can be seen clearly in William Barnes Wollen's painting: 28th Gloucester Regiment at Waterloo.

The union flag is also shown flying upside down, with the broad portion of the Saltaire of St Andrew to the bottom.

== Title and collection ==
The heavy gold frame bears the inscription "Egypt" at the top, and "Quatre-Bras 1815" below.

The work was exhibited at the Royal Academy Summer Exhibition in 1875, the year after Elizabeth Thompson exhibited her acclaimed The Roll Call. It was bought by the National Gallery of Victoria, Melbourne, Australia, in 1884.
