= William Butler (British Army officer) =

British Army officer and writer (1838–1910)

Lieutenant-General The Right Honourable Sir William Butler GCB
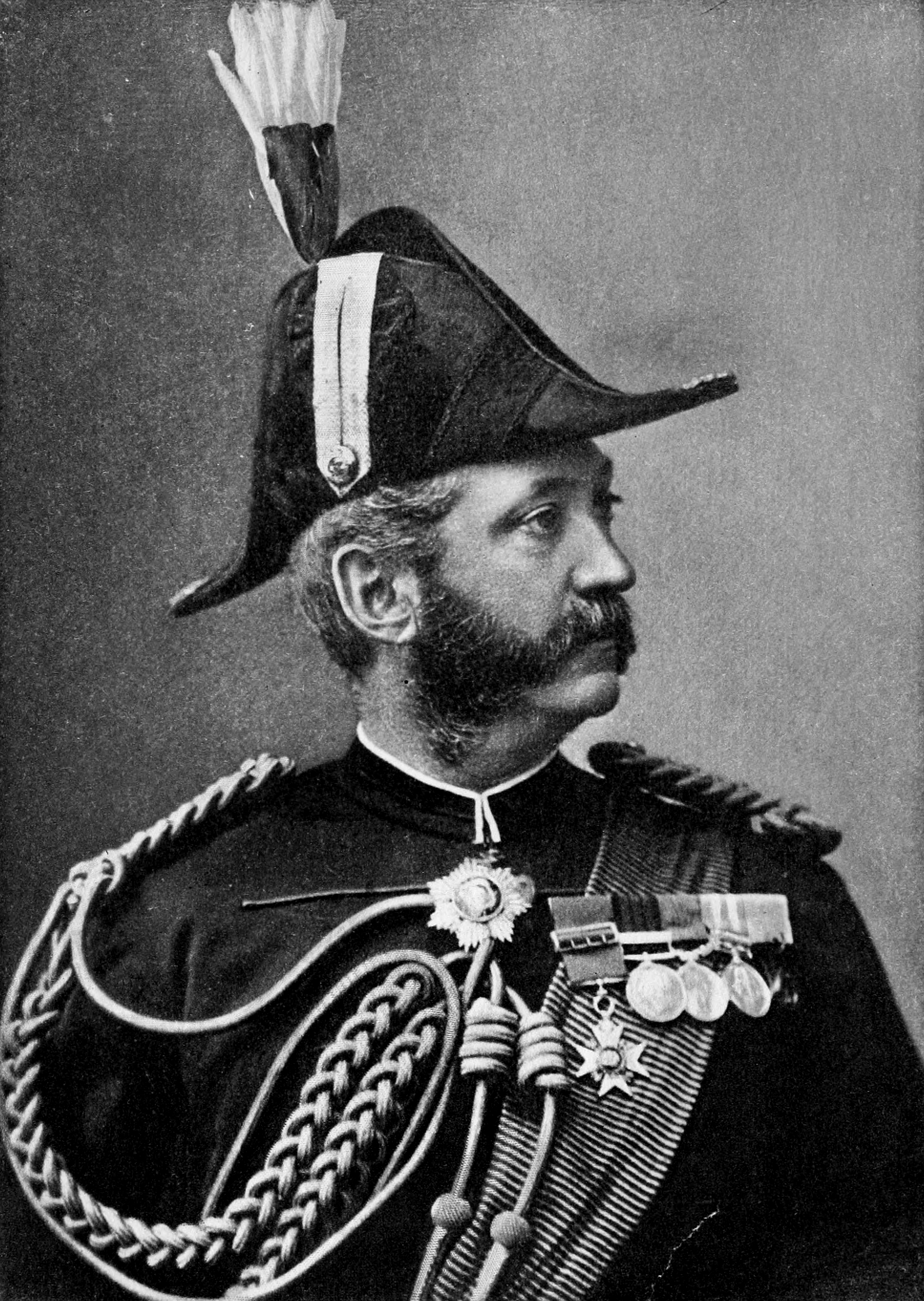
- Born: 31 October 1838; Golden, County Tipperary, Ireland
- Died: 7 June 1910 (aged 71); Bansha Castle, County Tipperary, Ireland
- Burial place: Killaldriffe, County Tipperary, Ireland
- Spouse: Elizabeth Thompson
- Military career
- Allegiance: United Kingdom
- Branch: British Army
- Rank: Lieutenant-General
- Unit: 69th Foot
- Commands: South Africa
- Awards: GCB

Lieutenant-General Sir William Francis Butler, GCB, PC (Ire) (31 October 1838 – 7 June 1910) was an Irish British Army officer and writer.

== Military career ==
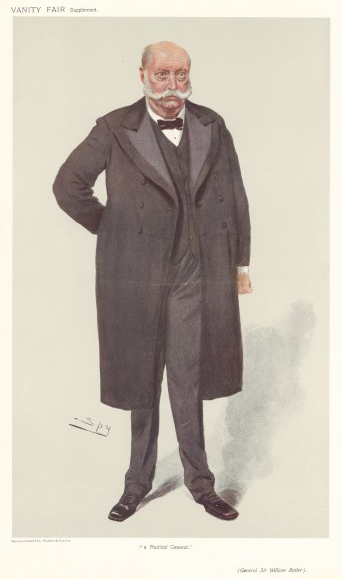
General Butler caricatured by Spy for Vanity Fair, 1907

A scion of the Butler dynasty via the Earls of Ormond, he was born at Ballyslatteen, Golden, County Tipperary, Ireland, the son of Richard Butler and Ellen née Dillon. The great famine of 1847 and scenes of suffering and eviction were amongst his earliest recollections. He was educated chiefly by the Jesuits at Tullabeg College.

Butler entered the Army as an ensign of the 69th Foot at Fermoy Barracks in 1858, becoming captain in 1872 and major in 1874. He took part with distinction in the Red River expedition (1870–71) and the Ashanti operations of 1873–74 under Wolseley and was appointed a Companion of the Order of the Bath in 1874.

Butler again served with General Wolseley in the Zulu War (as brevet lieutenant-colonel), the campaign of Tel-el-Kebir (after which he was appointed aide-de-camp to the Queen) and the Sudan in 1884–86, becoming colonel on the staff 1885 and brigadier-general 1885–86. In the latter year, he was promoted Knight Commander of the Order of the Bath. He served as brigadier-general on the staff in Egypt until 1892 when he was promoted to major-general and stationed at Aldershot, subsequent to which he was given command of the South-Eastern District in March 1896, resident as Lieutenant of Dover Castle.

In 1898 he succeeded General Sir William Howley Goodenough as commander-in-chief in South Africa, with the local rank of lieutenant-general. For a short period (December 1898 – February 1899), during the absence of Sir Alfred Milner in England, he acted as High Commissioner, and as such, and subsequently in his military capacity, he expressed views on the subject of the probabilities of war which were not approved by the home government; he was consequently ordered home to command the Western District, and held this post until 1905. He also held the Aldershot Command for a brief period from 1900 to 1901. Sir William Butler was promoted to lieutenant-general in 1900 and continued to serve, finally leaving the King's service in 1905.

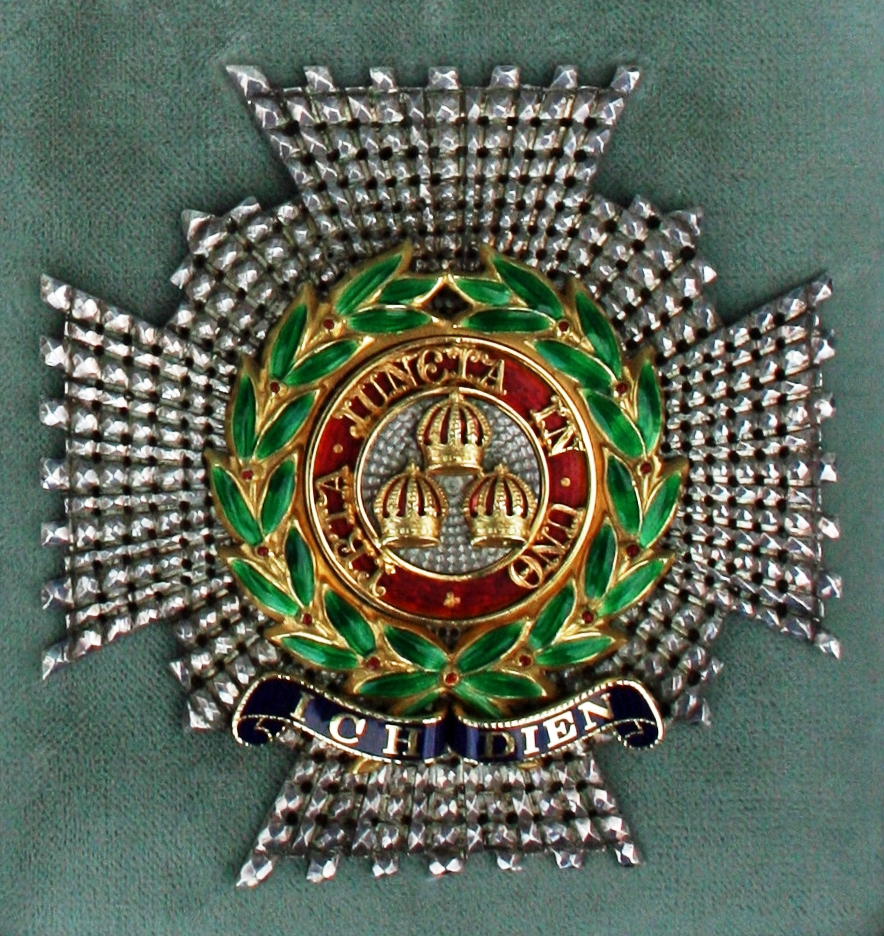
GCB breast star

== Family and Retirement ==
Butler married on 11 June 1877 Elizabeth Thompson, an accomplished painter of battle scenes, notably The Roll Call (1874), Quatre Bras (1875), Rorke's Drift (1881), The Camel Corps (1891), and The Dawn of Waterloo (1895).

Her most famous painting, the 1881 Scotland Forever! depicts a strategically meaningful charge of the British heavy cavalry regiment - the Royal Scots Greys at the Battle of Waterloo in June 1815. As Lady Elizabeth had never observed battle, she arranged to view Sir William's regiment in practice maneuvers - even positioning herself to view several charges head-on.

They had six children. His elder daughter, Elizabeth Butler, married Lt.-Col. Randolph Albert Fitzhardinge Kingscote (6 Feb 1867 – 8 Dec 1940). On 24 July 1903 and his younger daughter, Eileen Butler, married Jenico Preston, 15th Viscount Gormanston (16 July 1879 – 7 November 1925) on 26 October 1911.

In October 1905, having reached the age limit of sixty-seven, he was placed on the retired list. The few years of life which remained to him he spent at Bansha Castle in Ireland, devoted chiefly to the cause of education. He was a frequent lecturer both in Dublin and the provinces on historical, social, and economic matters. Butler was known as a Home Ruler and an admirer of Charles Stewart Parnell. He was a member of the Senate of the National University of Ireland, and a commissioner of the Board of National Education. In June 1906, he was elevated as a Knight Grand Cross of the Order of the Bath in the 1906 Birthday Honours, and in 1909 he was sworn of the Irish Privy Council.

Butler died at Bansha Castle and was buried at the cemetery of Killaldriffe, a few miles distant and not far from his ancestral home.

He had long been known as a descriptive writer, since his publication of The Great Lone Land (1872), describing the Red River Expedition in suppression of the Red River Rebellion, and subsequent travel across Western Canada for the Government, to report on conditions there. Other works include biographies of Charles George Gordon (1889) and Sir George Colley (1899). In his biography of Gordon, he wrote the epigram "The nation that will insist upon drawing a broad line of demarcation between the fighting man and the thinking man is liable to find its fighting done by fools and its thinking by cowards"^{:85} which has since frequently been misattributed to Thucydides.

General Butler had started work on his autobiography a few years before his death but died before it was completed. His youngest daughter, Eileen, Lady Gormanston, completed the work and had it published in 1911. Lady Gormanston found among his papers a poem he had written, which began:

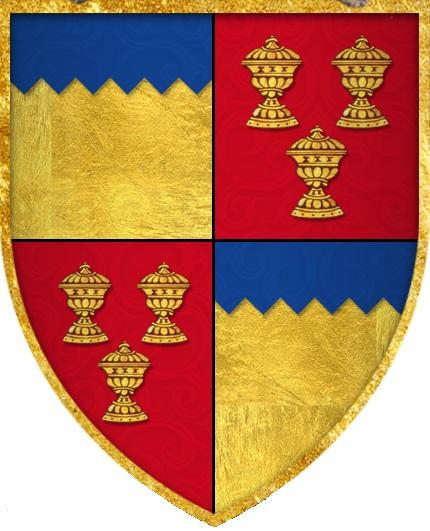

Give me but six-foot-three (one inch to spare)
Of Irish earth, and dig it anywhere;
And for my poor soul say an Irish prayer
Above the spot.

== See also ==
- Butler dynasty

== Works ==
- O'Brien, R. Barry, ed. (1903). "Oliver Cromwell in Ireland" . Studies in Irish History, 1649–1775. Dublin: Browne and Nolan. pp. 1–65.

Military offices
Preceded by Lord William Seymour	GOC South-Eastern District; 1896–1898	Succeeded by Sir Leslie Rundle
Preceded by Sir Frederick Forestier-Walker	GOC Western District; 1899–1905	Succeeded by Command disbanded
Preceded by Sir Alexander Moore	GOC-in-C Aldershot Command (acting); 1900–1901	Succeeded by Sir Redvers Buller
