= Elizabeth Thompson =

British painter (1846–1933)

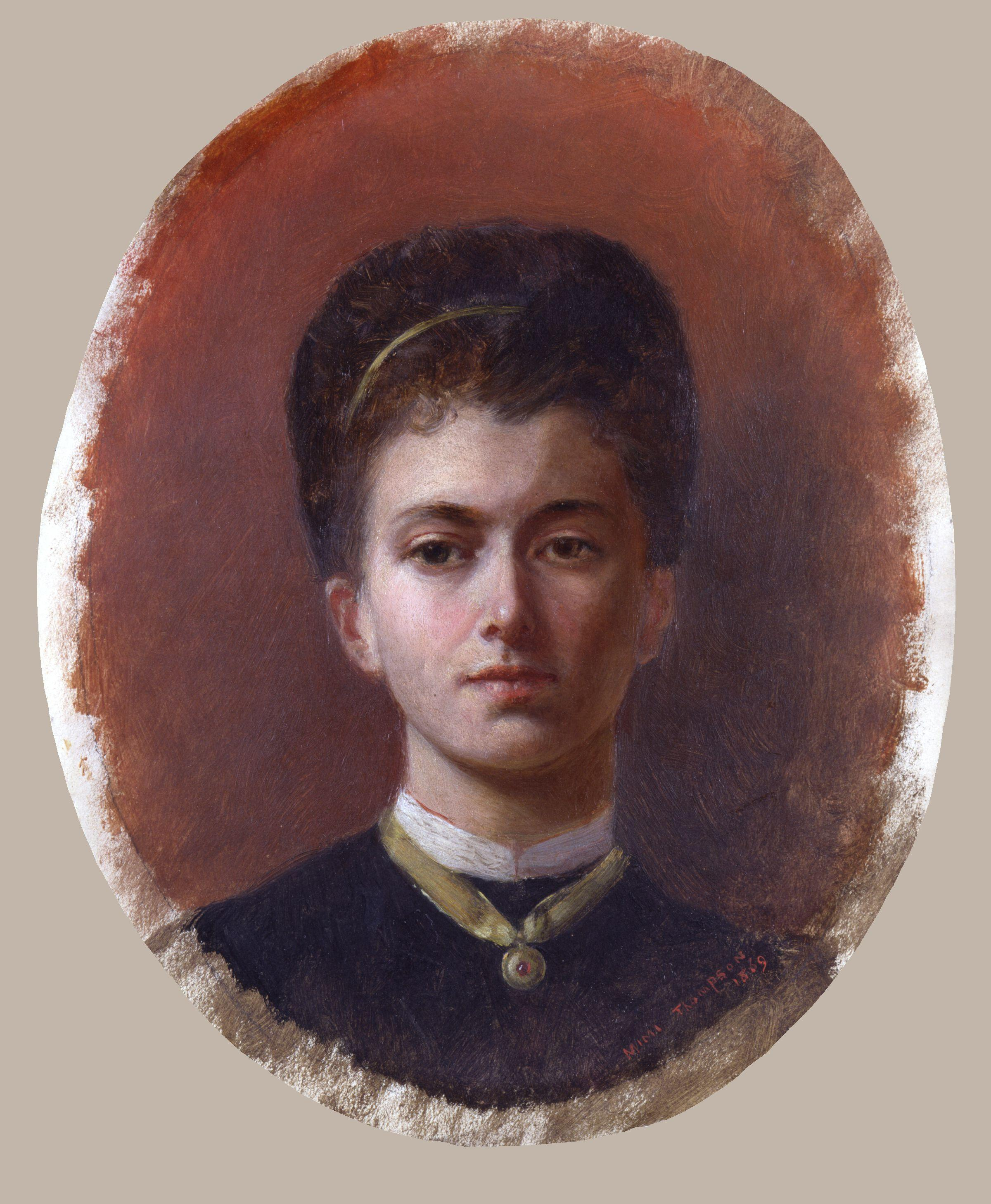
- Self-portrait, 1869
- Born: Elizabeth Southerden Thompson; 3 November 1846; Lausanne, Switzerland
- Died: 2 October 1933 (aged 86); Gormanston Castle, County Meath, Ireland
- Known for: Painting
- Notable work: The Roll Call, 1874; The 28th Regiment at Quatre Bras, 1875; The Defence of Rorke's Drift, 1880; Scotland Forever!, 1881
- Movement: History painting, military art
- Title: Lady Butler
- Spouse: Sir William Butler
- Children: 6

Signature
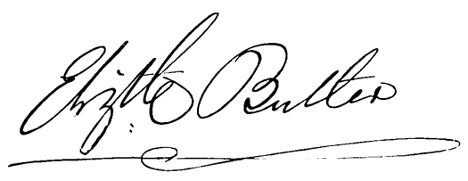

Elizabeth Southerden Thompson (3 November 1846 – 2 October 1933), later known as Lady Butler, was a British painter who specialised in painting scenes from British military campaigns and battles, including the Crimean War and the Napoleonic Wars. Her notable works include The Roll Call (purchased by Queen Victoria), The Defence of Rorke's Drift, and Scotland Forever! (showing the Scots Greys at Waterloo). She wrote about her military paintings in an autobiography published in 1922: "I never painted for the glory of war, but to portray its pathos and heroism."

She married British Army officer William Butler, becoming Lady Butler after he was knighted.

== Early life and education ==
Born at the Villa Claremont in Lausanne, Switzerland, Butler was the daughter of Thomas James Thompson (1812–1881) and his second wife, Christiana Weller (1825–1910). Her sister was the noted essayist and poet Alice Meynell. Elizabeth began receiving art instruction in 1862, while growing up in Italy. In 1866, she entered the Female School of Art in South Kensington in London. She began exhibiting her artwork, usually watercolours, as a student. In 1867, one watercolour, Bavarian Artillery Going into Action, was shown at the Dudley Gallery, one of the galleries preferred by women artists. The same year, she exhibited an oil painting, Horses in Sunshine, at the Society of Female Artists.

She became a Roman Catholic along with the rest of her family after they moved to Florence in 1869. While in Florence, under the tutelage of the artist Giuseppe Bellucci (1827–1882), she attended the Accademia di Belle Arti. She signed her works as E.B. (post-1877), Elizth. Thompson, or Mimi Thompson (she was called "Mimi" from her childhood).

== Artistic career ==
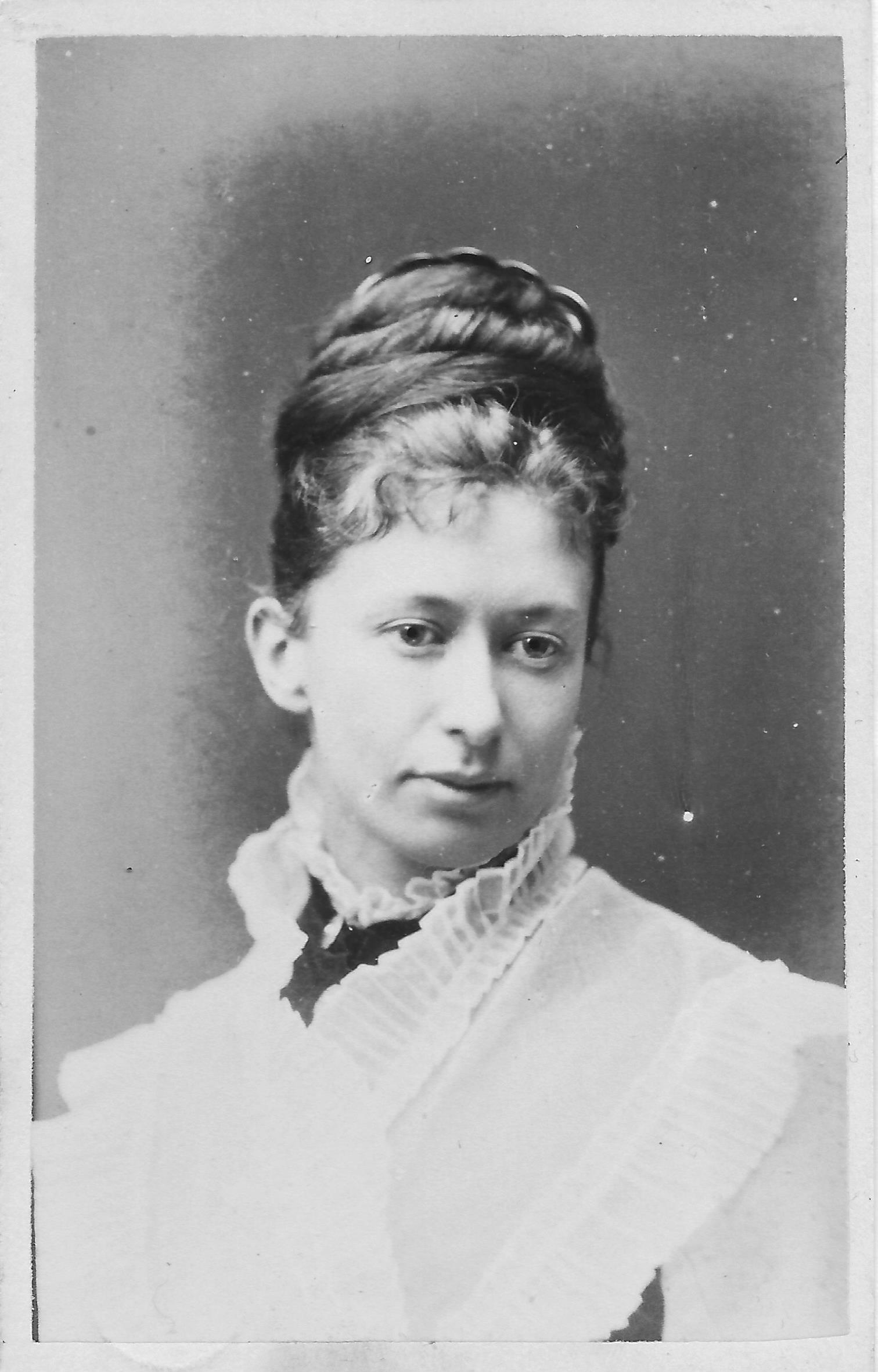
Carte de visite by Thrupp c.1875

Initially concentrating on religious subjects like The Magnificat (1872), upon going to Paris in 1870, she was exposed to battle scenes from Jean Louis Ernest Meissonier and Édouard Detaille, and switched her focus to war paintings. With the painting Missing (1873), a Franco-Prussian War battle scene depicting the common soldiers' suffering and heroism, she earned her first submission to the Royal Academy. Her painting The Roll Call, which depicted a line of soldiers worn out with conflict, was shown in 1874 at the Royal Academy Summer Exhibition and became so popular that a policeman had to be stationed next to the painting in order to regulate the crowds that came to see it. Butler later wrote that after the opening of the Summer Exhibition, she awoke to find herself famous.

Her fame increased as the paintings toured Europe, along with photographs of Elizabeth. She gained even more notice because people found out that she was both young and pretty, something normally not associated with painters of battle scenes. It also helped that during this time, there was a huge swell of Victorian pride and romanticism for the growing British Empire. While Lady Butler's topics reflected such romanticism, her paintings were generally realistic in detail, with aspects such as confusion, mud and exhaustion being accurately portrayed. Her works tend to focus on British troops shown in action, or shortly after it, but avoiding scenes of hand-to-hand combat. The troops are often shown as their opponents might have seen them, but relatively few of the opponents themselves are shown.

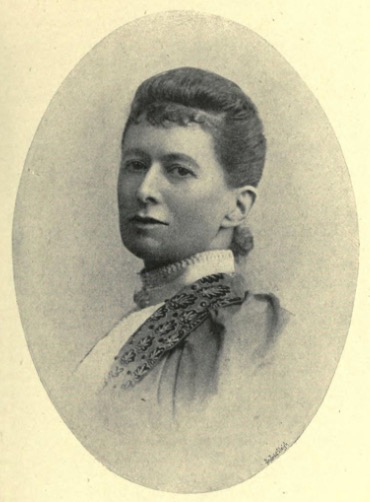
Portrait of Lady Butler (unknown date, but no later than 1895)

In 1879, Butler came within two votes of becoming the first woman to be elected as an Associate Member of the Royal Academy (apart from two founder Members, Mary Moser and Angelica Kauffman; ultimately, the first female Associate Member was Annie Swynnerton, elected in 1922, and the first full Member was Laura Knight in 1936).

After her marriage in 1877 to William Francis Butler, a distinguished British Army officer, from County Tipperary, Ireland, she travelled to the far reaches of the Empire with her husband and raised their six children. Butler also produced some black and white illustrations, including of poems by her sister, Alice Meynell, and of works by Thackeray. Lady Butler exhibited her work at the Palace of Fine Arts and The Woman's Building at the 1893 World's Columbian Exposition in Chicago, Illinois. Her elder daughter, Elizabeth, married Lt.-Col. Randolph Albert Fitzhardinge Kingscote (6 Feb 1867 – 8 Dec 1940) on 24 July 1903 and her younger daughter, Eileen, married Viscount Gormanston (16 July 1879 – 7 November 1925) on 26 October 1911.

== Later life and death ==
On her husband's retirement from the Army, she moved to Ireland, where they lived at Bansha Castle, County Tipperary. Lady Butler showed pictures at the Royal Hibernian Academy from 1892. Among the paintings that she took with her to County Tipperary was a set of water-colours that she had painted while stationed with her husband in Palestine. During the Irish Civil War these were transferred to her daughter for safekeeping at Gormanston Castle, then Viscount Gormanston's London townhouse, where almost all were destroyed during the Second World War.

Widowed in 1910, Lady Butler lived at Bansha Castle until 1922, when she took up residence with the youngest of her six children, Eileen, Viscountess Gormanston, at Gormanston Castle, County Meath. She died there in 1933 shortly before her 87th birthday being interred at nearby Stamullen churchyard.

Butler was included in the 2018 exhibit Women in Paris 1850–1900, whilst the 2023 play Modest covered her life from Roll Call to her rejection as an Associate of the Royal Academy.

== Paintings ==
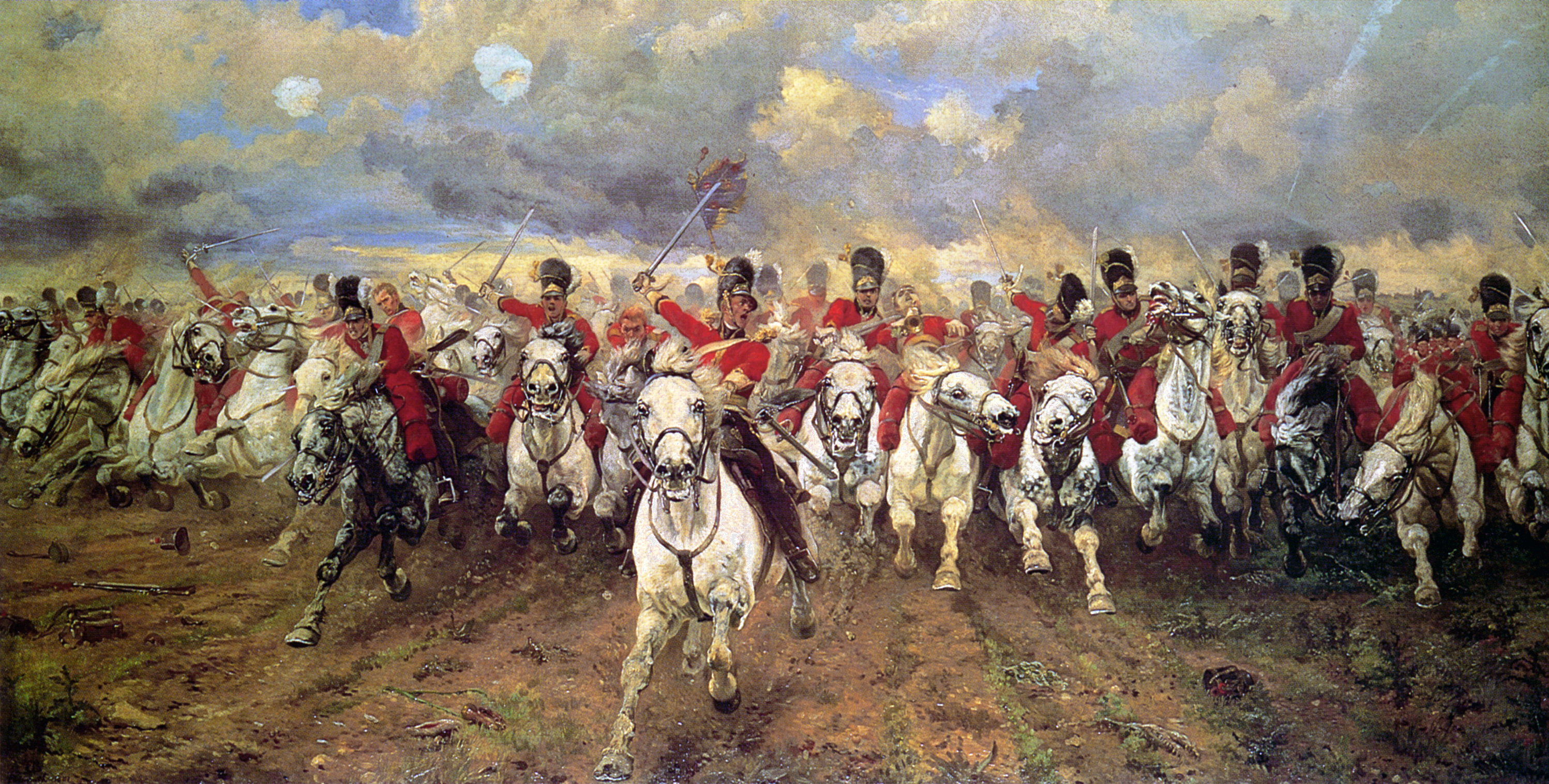
Scotland Forever!, 1881, Leeds Art Gallery

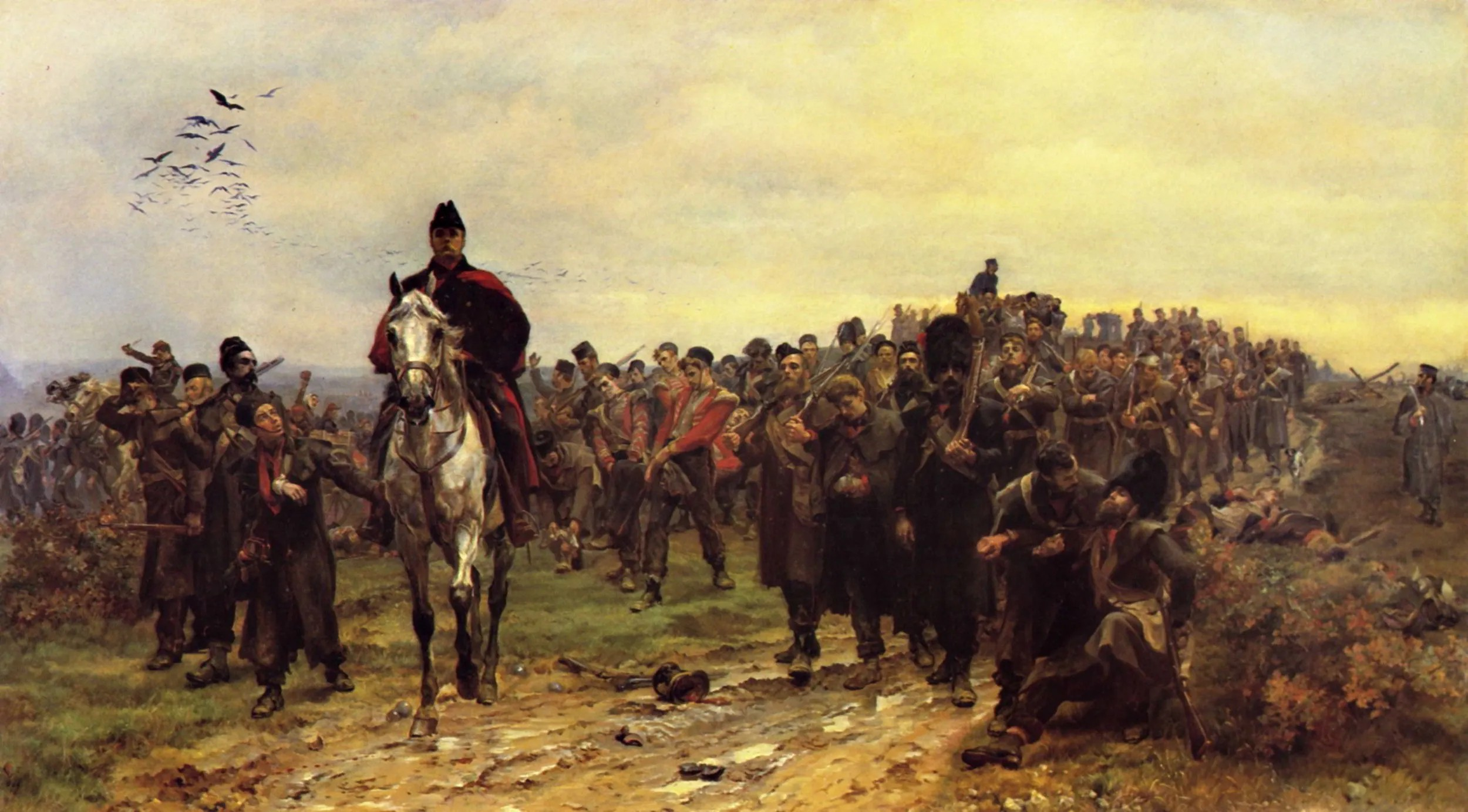
The Return from Inkerman (1877), Ferens Art Gallery, Kingston-upon-Hull

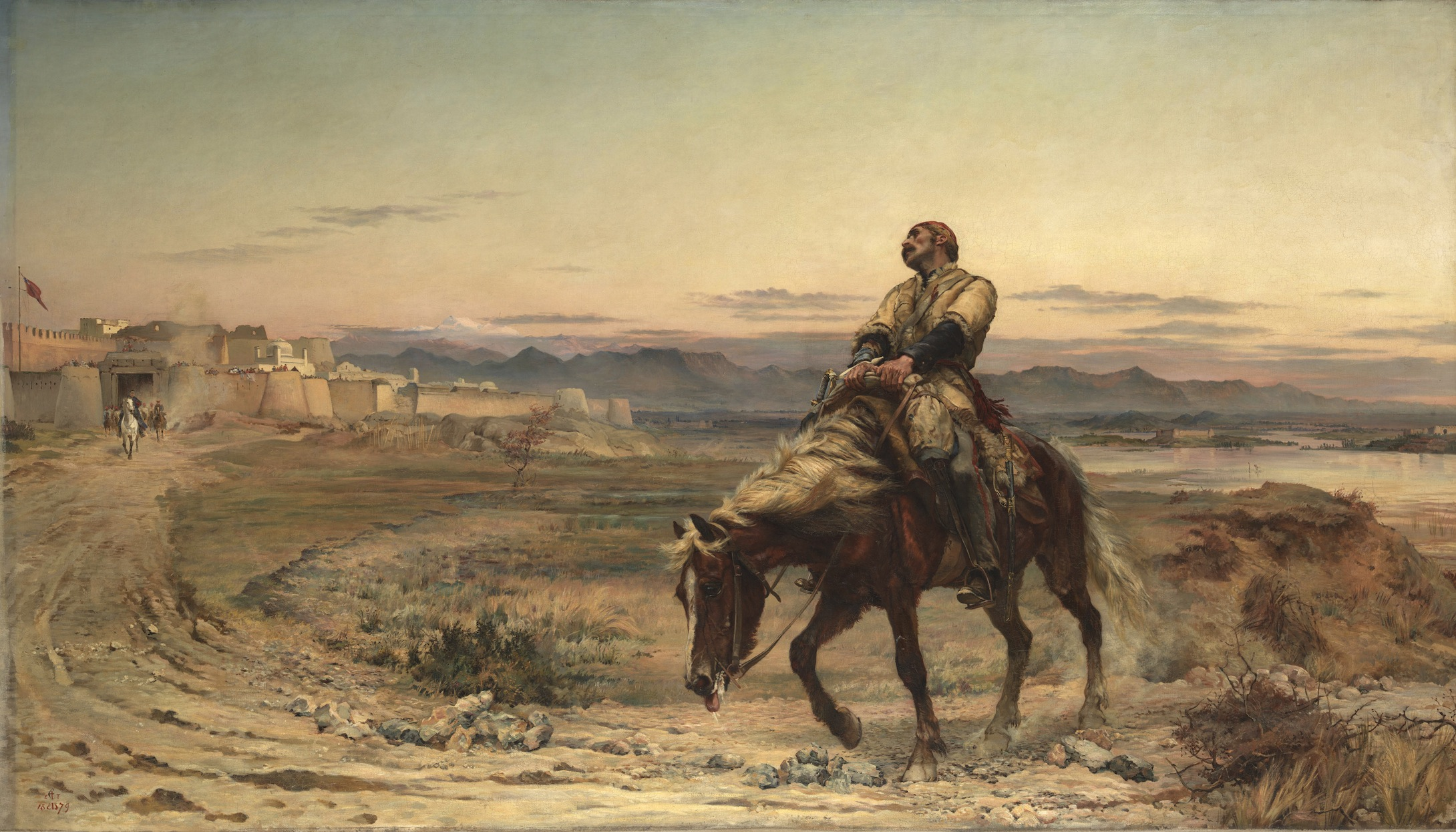
Remnants of an Army (1879), Tate Britain, showing the arrival of William Brydon at the gates of Jalalabad on 13 January 1842.

- The Magnificat (1872)
- Missing (1873)
- Calling the Roll After An Engagement, Crimea (or The Roll Call (1874) – Royal Collection; Buckingham Palace)
- Missed (1874)
- The 28th Regiment at Quatre Bras (1875 – National Gallery of Victoria, Melbourne)
- Balaclava (1876 – City of Manchester Art Gallery)
- The Return from Inkerman (1877 – Ferens Art Gallery, Kingston-upon-Hull)
- Listed for the Connaught Rangers (1878 – Bury Art Museum)
- Remnants of an Army (1879 – Tate Britain)
- The Defence of Rorke's Drift (1880 – Royal Collection; Windsor Castle)
- Scotland Forever! (1881 – Leeds Art Gallery)
- Tel-el-Kebir (1885)
- To the Front: French Cavalry Leaving a Breton City on the Declaration of War (1888–89 – Private Collection)
- Evicted (1890 – The Irish Folklore Commission University College Dublin)
- The Camel Corps (1891)
- Halt in a Forced March (1892 – Shropshire Military Museum, Shrewsbury Castle)
- The Rescue of the Wounded (1895)
- The Dawn of Waterloo (1895 – National Army Museum, formerly Falkland Palace)
- Steady, the Drums and Fifes! (1897 – HM The Queen; 57th Middlesex Regiment, now in the collection of the Princess of Wales's Royal Regiment)
- Floreat Etona! (1898 – Private Collection)
- Dawn at Waterloo (1898 – Private Collection)
- The Morning of Talavera (1898)
- The Colours: Advance of the Scots Guards at the Alma (1899 – Scots Guards)
- Within Sound of Guns (1903 – painted at Bansha Castle; Staff College, Camberley)
- Stand Fast Craigellachie (1903 – National War Museum Scotland)
- Rescue of Wounded, Afghanistan (1905 – Staff College, Camberley)
- In vain! Rally for a last charge of the Cuirassiers (1912 – Private Collection)
- The 16th Light Dragoons saving the remnants of the Union Brigade (1915 – Private Collection)
- A Man of Kent (1919 − in the collection of the Princess of Wales's Royal Regiment)
- On the Morrow of Talavera (1923 – Private Collection)
- The Charge of The Dorset Yeomanry at Agagia, 26th February, 1916 (1917 – The Keep Military Museum, Dorchester)
- A Lament in the Desert (1925 – Private Collection)
- In the Retreat from Mons: The Royal Horse Guards (1927 – Royal Hospital, Chelsea)
- A Detachment of Cavalry in Flanders (1929 – Private Collection)

== Gallery ==
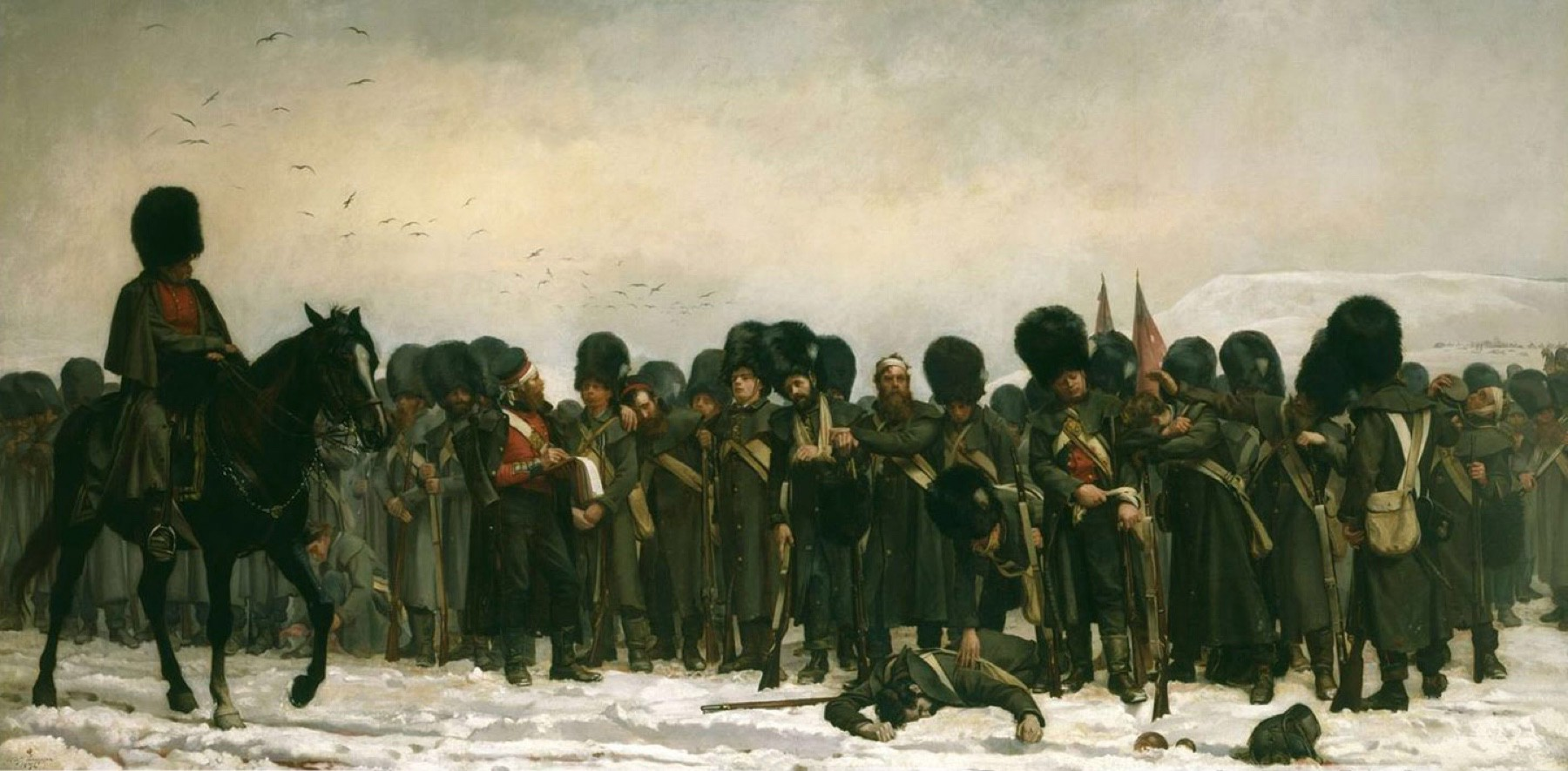
Calling the Roll After An Engagement, Crimea (1874), Royal Collection

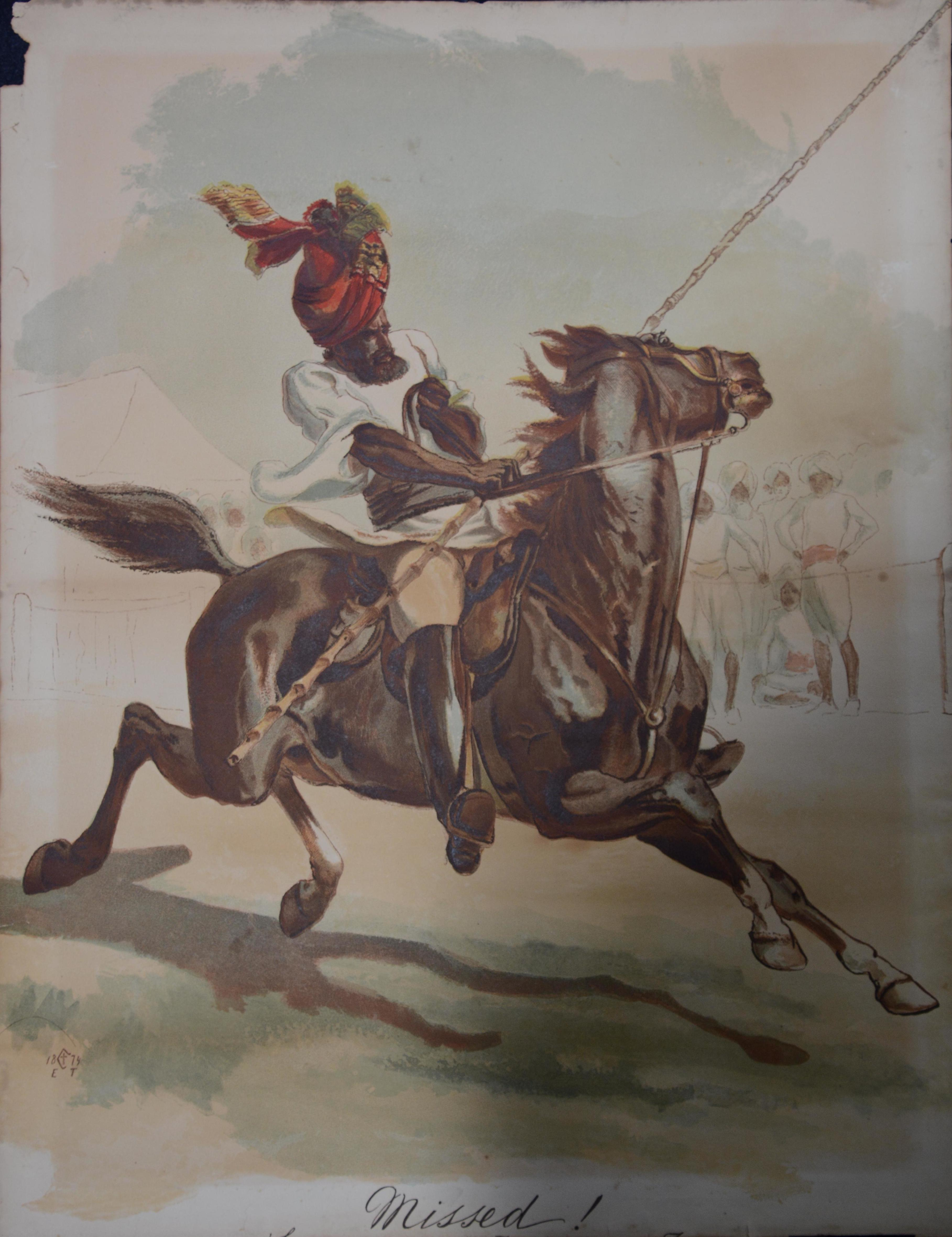
Missed (1874), private collection

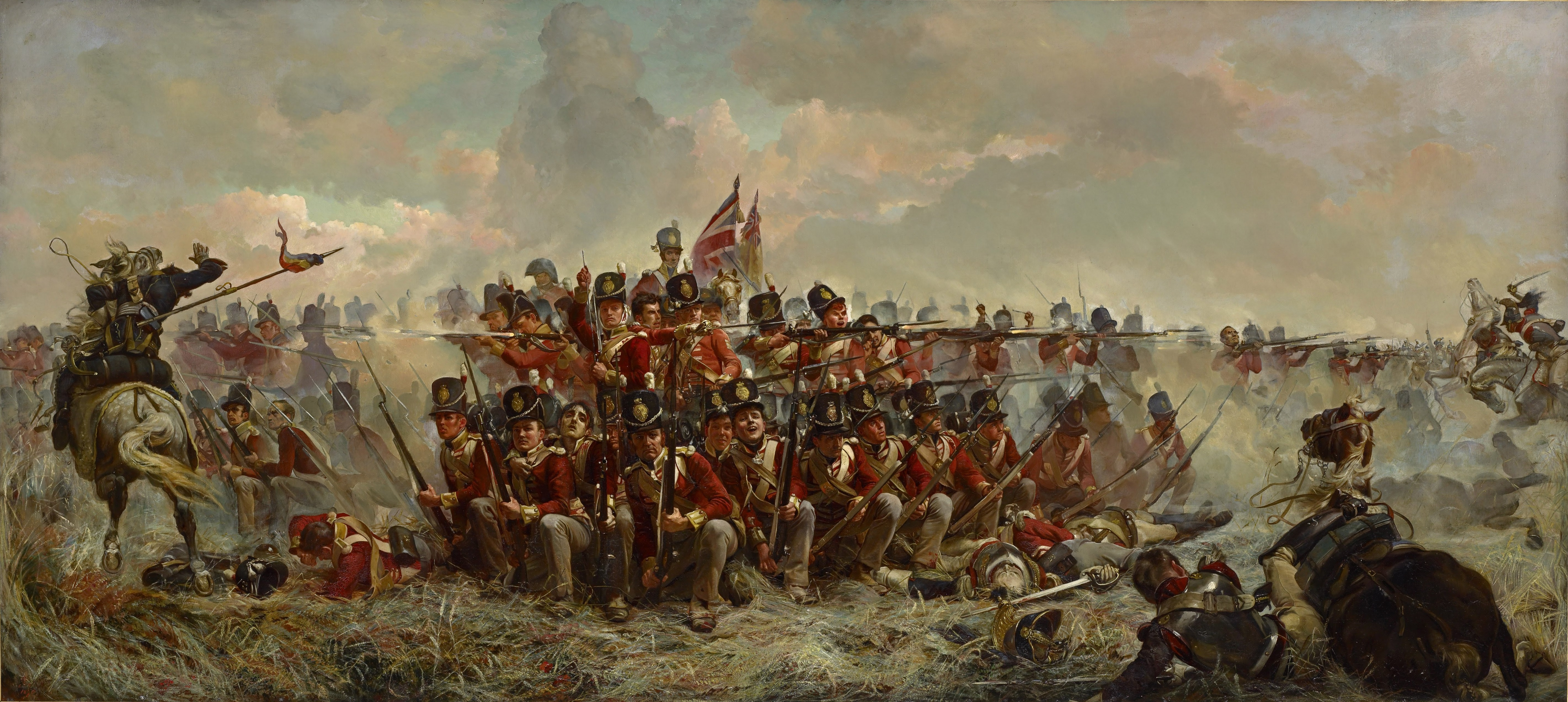
The 28th Regiment at Quatre Bras (1875),
National Gallery of Victoria, Australia

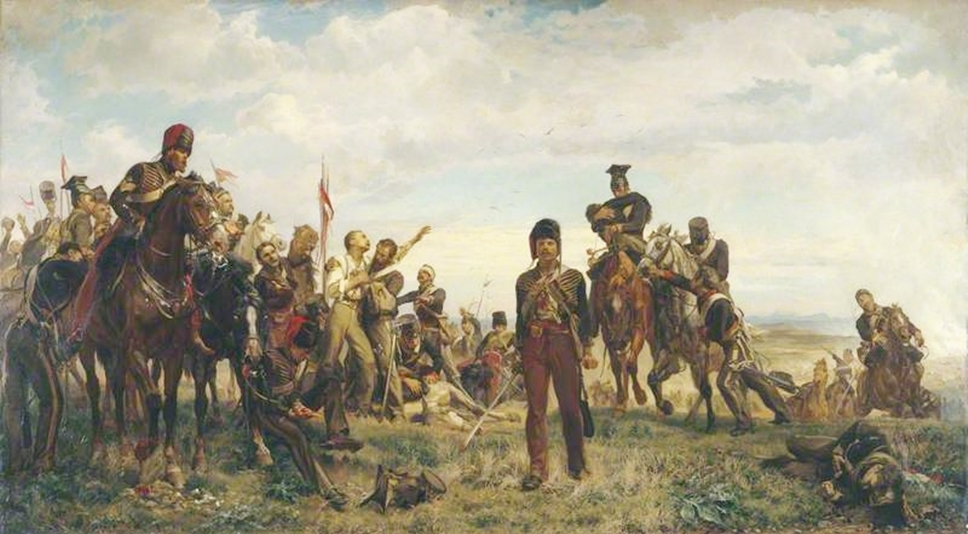
Balaclava (1876), Manchester Art Gallery

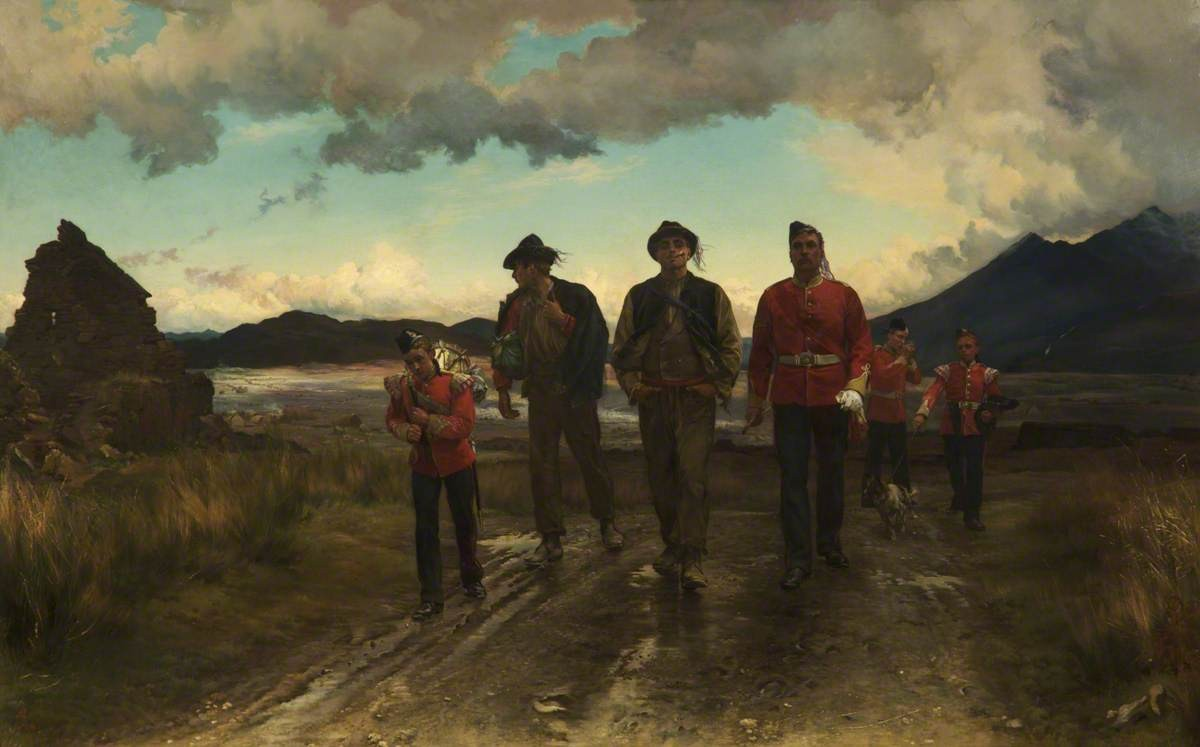
Listed for the Connaught Rangers (1878), Bury Art Museum

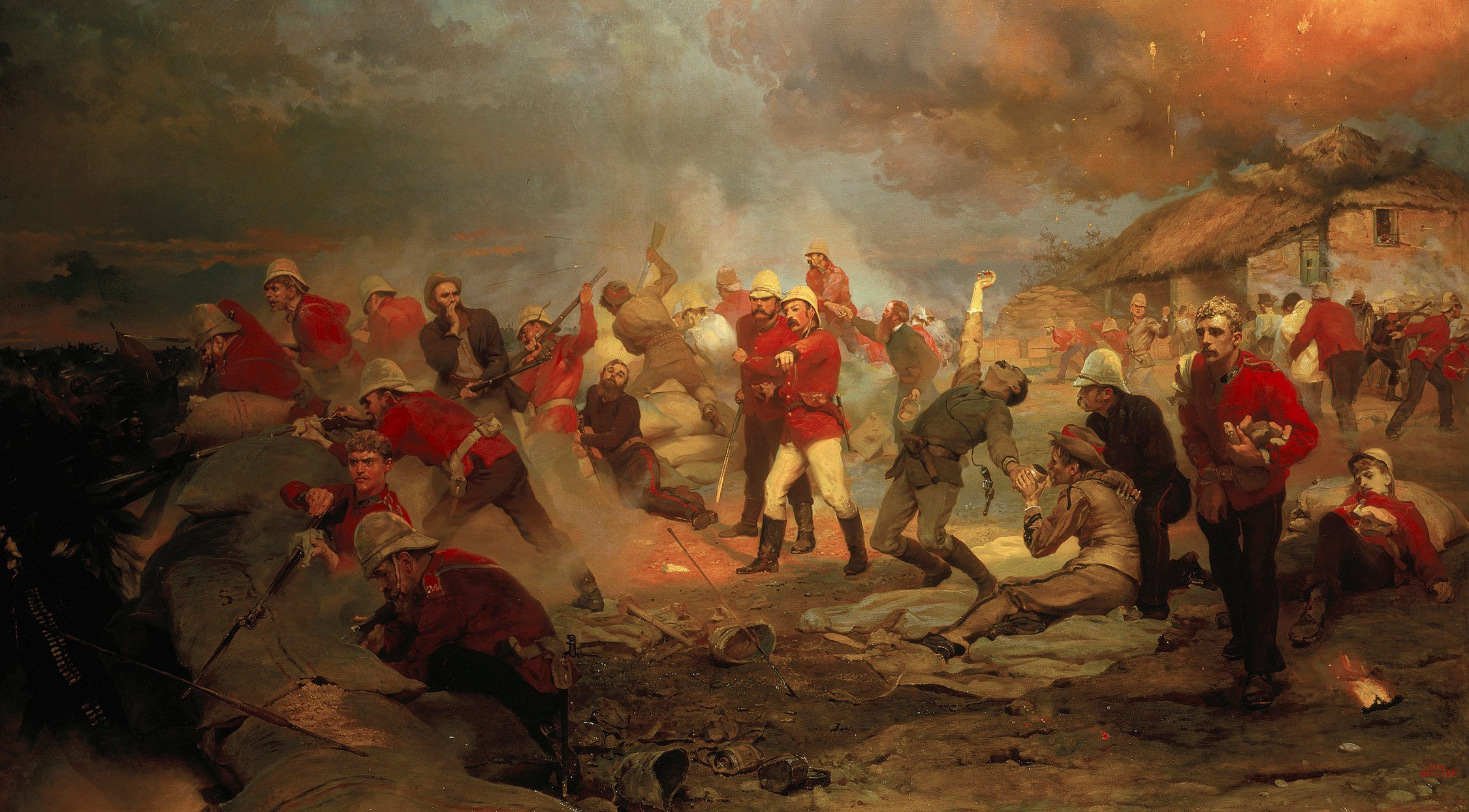
The Defence of Rorke's Drift (1880),
Royal Collection

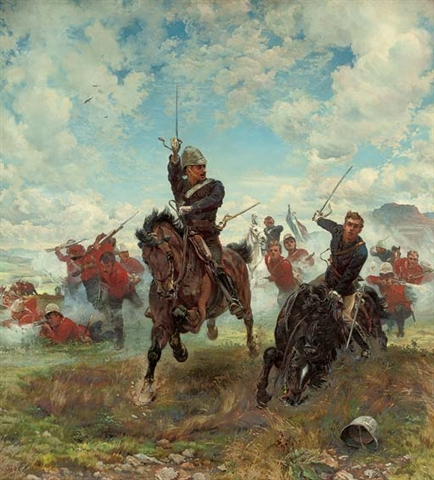
Floreat Etona! (1882), private collection

Dawn of Waterloo (1895), National Army Museum

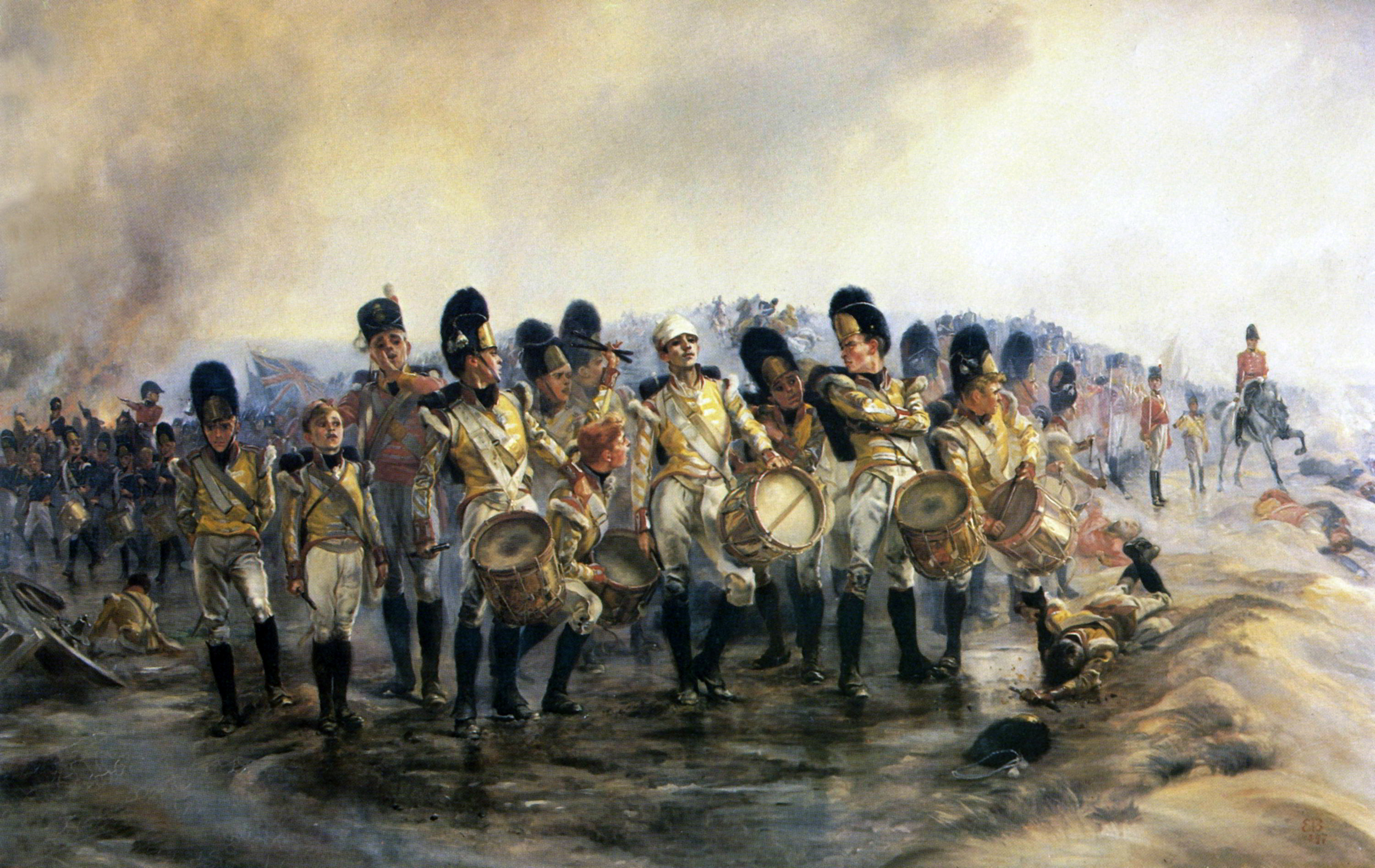
Steady, the Drums and Fifes! (1895), PWRR Museum, Dover Castle

The Royal Horse Guards Retreat from Mons, 1914 (1927), Royal Hospital Chelsea

== Literature ==
=== Works by ===
- Letters from the Holy Land (London: A & C Black, 1903).
- From Sketch-book and Diary (London: A & C Black, 1909).
- An Autobiography (London: Constable & Co., Ltd., 1923).
- Autobiography (Sevenoaks: Fisher Press, 1993). ISBN 1-874037-08-6

=== Works about ===
- Fillimore, Francis. – "Britain's Battle Painter: Lady Butler and Her Art". – New England Home Magazine. – Vol. XII, No. 13, September 1900, pp. 579–587 (also published in Windsor Magazine. – Vol. XI, December 1899 – May 1900, pp. 643–652)
- Gladwell, Malcolm. (2016). "The Lady Vanishes". – Episode 1, Season 1, Revisionist History Podcast. http://revisionisthistory.com/episodes/01-the-lady-vanishes
- Gormanston, Eileen. (1953). – A Little Kept. – New York: Sheed and Ward
- Harrington, Peter. (1993). – British Artists and War: The Face of Battle in Paintings and Prints, 1700–1914. – London: Greenhill. – ISBN 1-85367-157-6
- Lalumia, Matthew Paul. – "Lady Elizabeth Thompson Butler in the 1870s". – Woman's Art Journal. – Vol. 4, No. 1, Spring–Summer 1983, pp. 9–14
- Lee, Michael. – "A Centenary of Military Painting". – Army Quarterly. – October 1967
- Meynell, Wilfrid. (1898). – The Life and Work of Lady Butler. – London: The Art Annual
- O'Byrne, M. K. – "Lady Butler". – Irish Monthly. – December 1950
- Usherwood, Paul. – "Elizabeth Thompson Butler: a case of tokenism." – Woman's Art Journal. – Vol. 11, Fall–Winter 1990–91, 14–15
- Usherwood, Paul, and Jenny Spencer-Smith, (1987). – Lady Butler, Battle Artist, 1846–1933. – Gloucester: Sutton. – ISBN 0-86299-355-5
- Walker, J. Crompton. (1927). – Irish Life & Landscape. – Dublin: Talbot Press
- Irish Arts Review. – "The Royal Scottish Academy Exhibitors 1826–1990". – Volume 4 Number 4: Winter 1987. (Calne 1991)
- Chapter 3, The Victorian Artist by Julie Codell, 2012, Cambridge UP.
- Chapter 5, Masculinities in Victorian Painting by Joseph Kestner, 1995, Scolar Press.
