= The Return from Inkerman =

1877 painting by Elizabeth Thompson

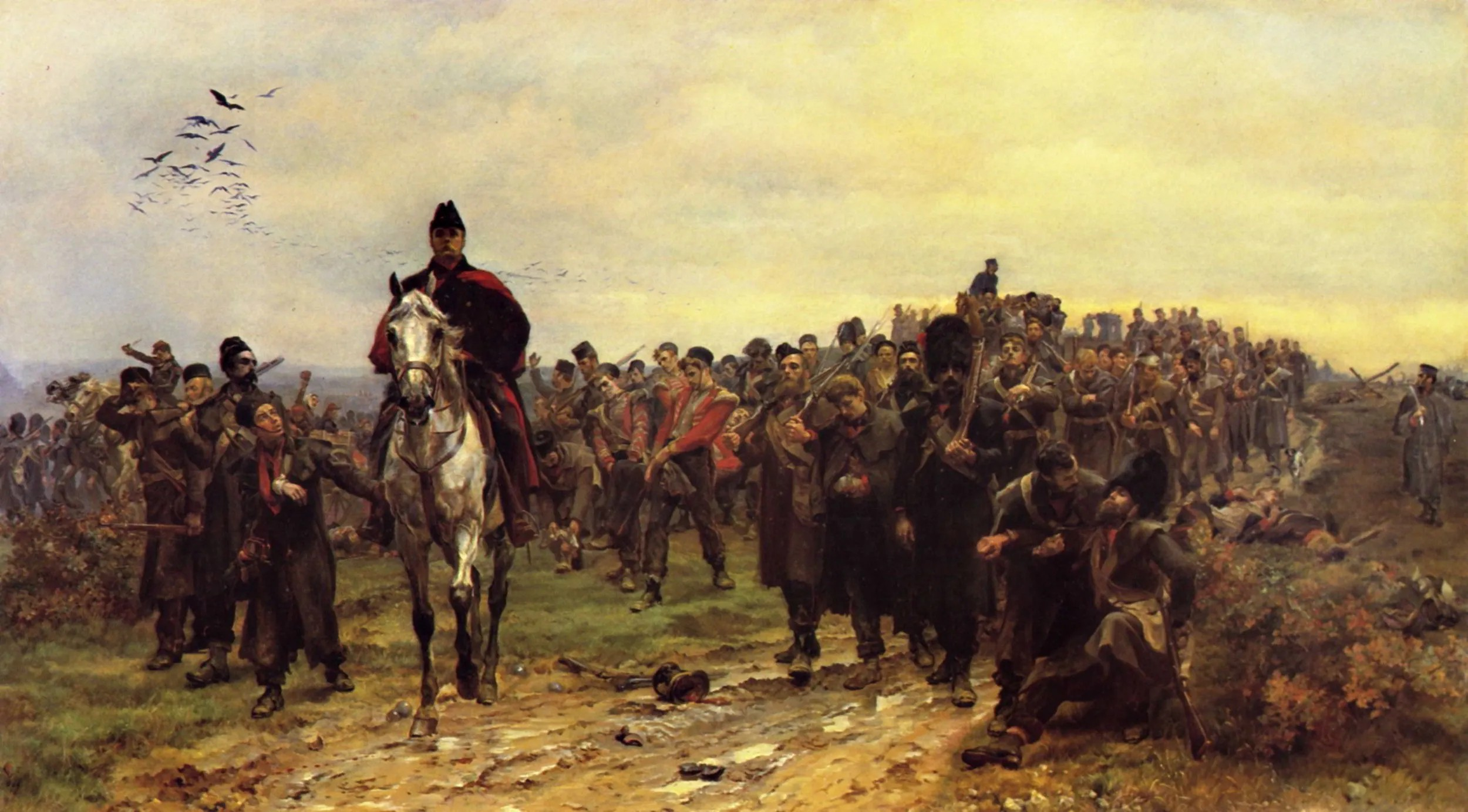
- Artist: Elizabeth Thompson
- Year: 1877
- Type: Oil on canvas, history painting
- Dimensions: 104.4 cm × 185.6 cm (41.1 in × 73.1 in)
- Location: Ferens Art Gallery, Hull

The Return from Inkerman is an 1877 oil painting by the English artist Elizabeth Thompson (Lady Butler). A historical war painting it depicts a scene from the Crimean War. After the hard-fought Battle of Inkerman on 5 November 1847, in which Allied troops resisted a Russian attempt to break the Siege of Sevastopol, British infantry are shown returning towards their encampment. Butler's style is notably realistic rather than romantic in depicting the experience of war.

Butler had made her name at the age of 26 with another Crimean scene The Roll Call when she exhibited it at this Royal Academy Exhibition of 1874. This work was intended as a follow up. The painting was displayed at the same year at the Fine Art Society in New Bond Street in London, rather than at the Royal Academy. The Society paid Butler £3,000 for the copyright to the painting, anticipating the lucrative reproduction market. Today it is in the collection of the Ferens Art Gallery in Hull in East Yorkshire, having been acquired in 1913.

== Bibliography ==
- Kestner, Joseph A. Masculinities in Victorian Painting. Scolar Press, 1985.
- Mackenzie, John M. "Imperialism and Popular Culture". Manchester University Press, 1986.
- Morris, Edward. Elizabeth Thompson. Liverpool University Press, 2001.
- Usherwood, Paul & Spencer-Smith, Jenny. Lady Butler, Battle Artist, 1846-1933. Sutton, 1987.
