= Zulu (1964 film) =

1964 film by Cy Endfield

- UK cinema release poster
- Directed by: Cy Endfield
- Screenplay by: John Prebble; Cy Endfield
- Story by: John Prebble
- Produced by: Stanley Baker; Cy Endfield
- Starring: Stanley Baker; Jack Hawkins; Ulla Jacobsson; James Booth; Michael Caine
- Narrated by: Richard Burton
- Cinematography: Stephen Dade
- Edited by: John Jympson
- Music by: John Barry
- Production company: Diamond Films
- Distributed by: Paramount Pictures
- Release date: 22 January 1964; (London)
- Running time: 139 minutes
- Country: United Kingdom
- Language: English
- Budget: US$ 1,720,000. (666,554. GBP) or £653,439
- Box office: $8 million (US)

Zulu is a 1964 British epic historical drama film depicting the 1879 Battle of Rorke's Drift between a detachment of the British Army and the Impi, in the Anglo-Zulu War. The film was directed and co-written by American screenwriter Cy Endfield. He had moved to the United Kingdom in 1951 for work after being blacklisted in Hollywood. It was produced by Stanley Baker and Endfield, with Joseph E. Levine as executive producer. The screenplay was by Endfield and historical writer John Prebble, based on Prebble's 1958 Lilliput article "Slaughter in the Sun".

The film stars Stanley Baker and introduces Michael Caine in his first major role, with a supporting cast that includes Jack Hawkins, Ulla Jacobsson, James Booth, Nigel Green, Paul Daneman, Glynn Edwards, Ivor Emmanuel, and Patrick Magee. Zulu chief Mangosuthu Buthelezi (a future South African political leader) played Zulu King Cetshwayo kaMpande, his great-grandfather. The opening and closing narration is spoken by Richard Burton.

First shown on the 85th anniversary of the battle, 22 January 1964, at the Plaza Theatre in the West End of London, Zulu received widespread critical acclaim, with praise for its sets, soundtrack, cinematography, action sequences, and the cast's performances, particularly Baker, Booth, Green, and Caine. The film brought Caine international fame. In 2017, a poll of 150 actors, directors, writers, producers, and critics for Time Out magazine ranked it as the 93rd best British film ever.

== Plot ==
In January 1879, following the defeat of 1,300 British soldiers at Isandlwana, Zulu warriors scavenge the battlefield. At a mass Zulu marriage ceremony witnessed by missionary Otto Witt and his daughter Margareta, Zulu King Cetshwayo is informed of the great victory. Witt and Margareta flee to their missionary station when they realise the Zulus will attack the remote outpost at Rorke's Drift in the Colony of Natal. A company of the British Army's 24th Regiment of Foot are using the station as a supply depot and hospital for British forces in Zululand.

Receiving news of Isandlwana from Natal Native Contingent Commander Adendorff and warnings that a force of 4,000 Zulus is approaching, Lieutenant John Chard of the Royal Engineers assumes command of the station's 150 men, 30 of whom are sick and wounded. He is slightly senior to their direct commander, Lieutenant Gonville Bromhead. With no time to evacuate, Chard decides to stay and fight and fortifies the station with upturned wagons, sacks of mealie, and hardtack crates formed into a defensive perimeter. A contingent of irregular South African cavalry arrives but refuse Chard's pleas to reinforce the station. Enraged by Chard arming the hospital's patients instead of evacuating them, Witt persuades the locals serving in the Natal Native Contingent to desert. Chard orders Witt locked in the chapel's supply room.

The first attack of the Zulu impis is repelled by British fire. Adendorff explains they're probing for weak points. A drunken Witt proclaims the soldiers will all perish in the coming battle and Chard permits Margareta to take him away. The Zulus let them pass. Chard realises the Zulus are aware of the weakly protected northern wall and fears attack from all sides. Under cover fire from Zulus armed with British rifles, waves of Zulu warriors attack the station. The hospital's hay roof is set alight by the Zulus, and Private Henry Hook rallies the patients to repel the Zulus and escape the burning building. Sergeant Robert Maxfield, Hook's mentally broken commanding NCO, is killed as the hospital burns down during the night.

The next morning a formation of Zulus approaches and sings a lament for their dead before launching again into their war chant. The British respond by singing the Welsh song "Men of Harlech". The Zulus launch another assault, threatening to overwhelm the dwindling defenders who fall back to a small redoubt in front of the chapel. They deploy their reserve, form three ranks and fire continuous volleys into the Zulus until they retreat.

Bromhead calls the roll, revealing the cost of the defence. When the Zulus re-form on the Oscarberg, the British prepare for another assault, and are astonished when the massed Zulus instead sing to honour the defenders' bravery. A closing voiceover lists the eleven Victoria Crosses awarded for the battle as Chard plants a Zulu shield in the ground.

== Cast ==
Michael Caine recalls auditioning for Zulu
from the BBC Radio 4 programme Front Row, 29 September 2010

- Stanley Baker as Lieutenant John Chard, an officer serving with the Royal Engineers, assigned to build a bridge nearby. He takes charge of the defence of Rorke's Drift by virtue of slight seniority in his commission date.
- Michael Caine as Lieutenant Gonville Bromhead, an upper-class officer who yields to Chard's command. He is inexperienced, arrogant, and dismissive of the Zulu army's capabilities, but slowly comes into his own by following Chard's example and proves to be courageous.
- Jack Hawkins as Reverend Otto Witt, a Swedish missionary based at Rorke's Drift.
- Ulla Jacobsson as his daughter Margareta Witt
- Chief Mangosuthu Buthelezi as King Cetshwayo; Cetshwayo was Buthelezi's maternal great-grandfather
- James Booth as Private Henry Hook, described as "a thief, a coward, and an insubordinate barrack-room lawyer", who has been confined to the hospital after falsely claiming sickness to get excused from his duties. He redeems himself and proves himself to be an excellent soldier in his defence of the hospital.
- Nigel Green as Colour Sergeant Frank Bourne, a seasoned NCO who plays a key role in organizing and leading the British defence.
- Paul Daneman as Sergeant Robert Maxfield, Private Hook's bedridden and mentally broken platoon sergeant.
- Joe Powell as Sergeant Joseph Windridge
- Ivor Emmanuel as Private Owen, a Welsh baritone and head of the company choir.
- Glynn Edwards as Corporal William Allen
- Neil McCarthy as Private Thomas, Owen's best friend who longs to return to his farm in Wales
- David Kernan as Private Frederick Hitch
- Gary Bond as Private Cole
- Peter Gill as Private 612 John Williams, a member of the company choir assigned to the squad defending the hospital.
- Richard Davies as Private 593 William Jones
- Denys Graham as Private 716 Robert Jones
- Patrick Magee as Surgeon-Major James Henry Reynolds
- Dickie Owen as Corporal Frederick Schiess, a hospitalised Swiss corporal in the Natal Native Contingent who volunteers for Chard's defenders
- Gert van den Bergh as Lieutenant Gert Adendorff, an Afrikaner officer serving with the Natal Native Contingent and one of the few survivors of the battle at Isandlwana. He advises Chard and fights alongside him
- Dennis Folbigge as Acting Assistant Commissary James Langley Dalton
- Larry Taylor as Hughes
- Kerry Jordan as Louis Byrne, the company cook who is forced to join the defenders despite his pleas of cowardice.
- Harvey Hall as Sick Man

== Production ==
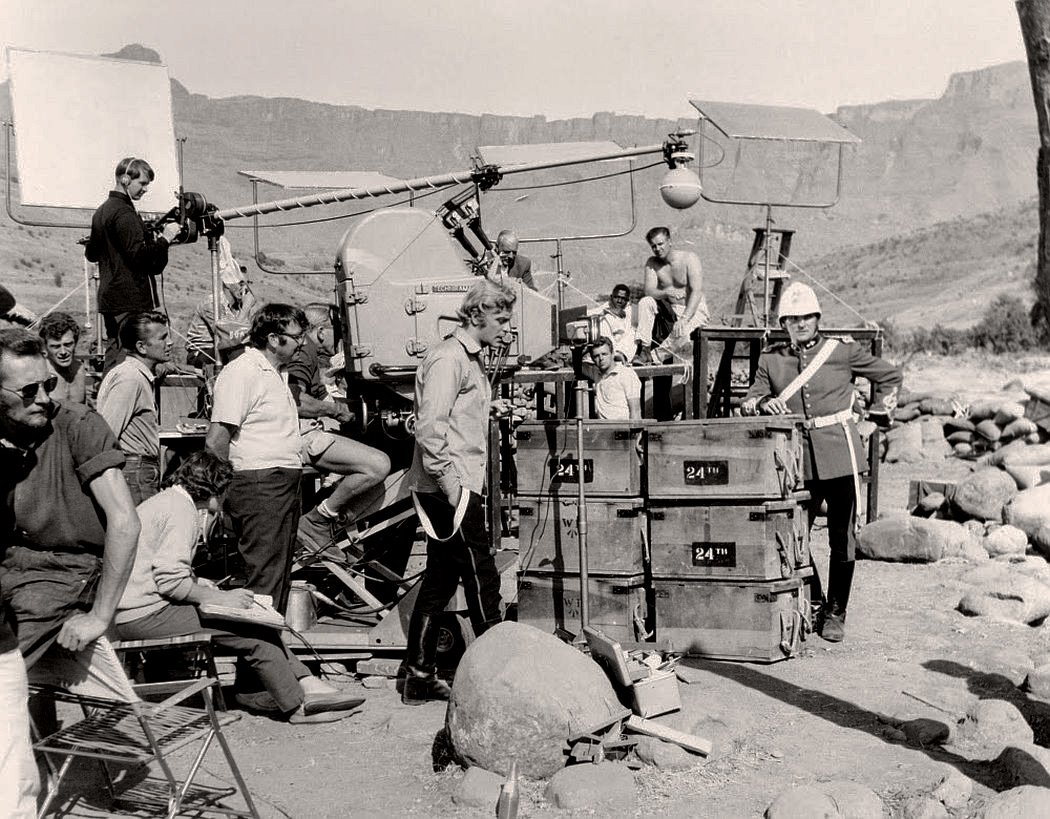
A break in shooting on location with stars Michael Caine and Stanley Baker present.

Cy Endfield was inspired to make the film after reading an article on the Battle of Rorke's Drift by John Prebble. He took it to actor Stanley Baker, with whom he had made several films and who was interested in moving into production. Endfield and Prebble drafted a script, which Baker showed to Joseph E. Levine while making Sodom and Gomorrah (1962) in Italy. Levine agreed to fund the movie, which Baker's company, Diamond Films, produced. It was shot using the Super Technirama 70 cinematographic process, and distributed by Paramount Pictures in all countries excluding the United States, where it was distributed by Embassy Pictures.

Most of Zulu was shot on location in South Africa. The mission depot at Rorke's Drift was recreated beneath the natural Amphitheatre in the Drakensberg Mountains. (This landscape was more precipitous and dramatic than the real Rorke's Drift, which is little more than two small hills). The set for the British field hospital and supply depot was created near the Tugela River with the Amphitheatre in the background. The real location of the battle was 100 kilometres (60 mi) to the northeast, on the Buffalo River near the isolated hill at Isandlwana.

Other scenes were filmed within the national parks of the then Province of Natal. Interiors and all the scenes starring James Booth were completed at Twickenham Film Studios in Middlesex, England. The majority of the Zulu warriors were real Zulus. The 240 Zulu extras who were employed for the battle scenes, were bused in from their tribal homes more than 100 miles away. Around 1,000 additional tribesmen were filmed by the second unit in Zululand. Eighty South African military servicemen were cast as soldiers.

The film was compared by Baker to a Western movie, with the traditional roles of the United States Cavalry and Native Americans taken by the British and the Zulu, respectively. Director Endfield showed a Western to Zulu extras to demonstrate the concept of film acting and how he wanted the warriors to conduct themselves.

It has been rumoured that due to the apartheid laws in South Africa, none of the Zulu extras could be paid for his performance. Endfield was said to have circumvented this restriction by leaving them all the animals, primarily cattle, that were used in the film. These are highly valued in their society. This allegation is incorrect; no such law existed and all the Zulu extras were paid in full. The main body of extras were paid the equivalent of nine shillings per day each, additional extras eight shillings, and the female dancers slightly less.

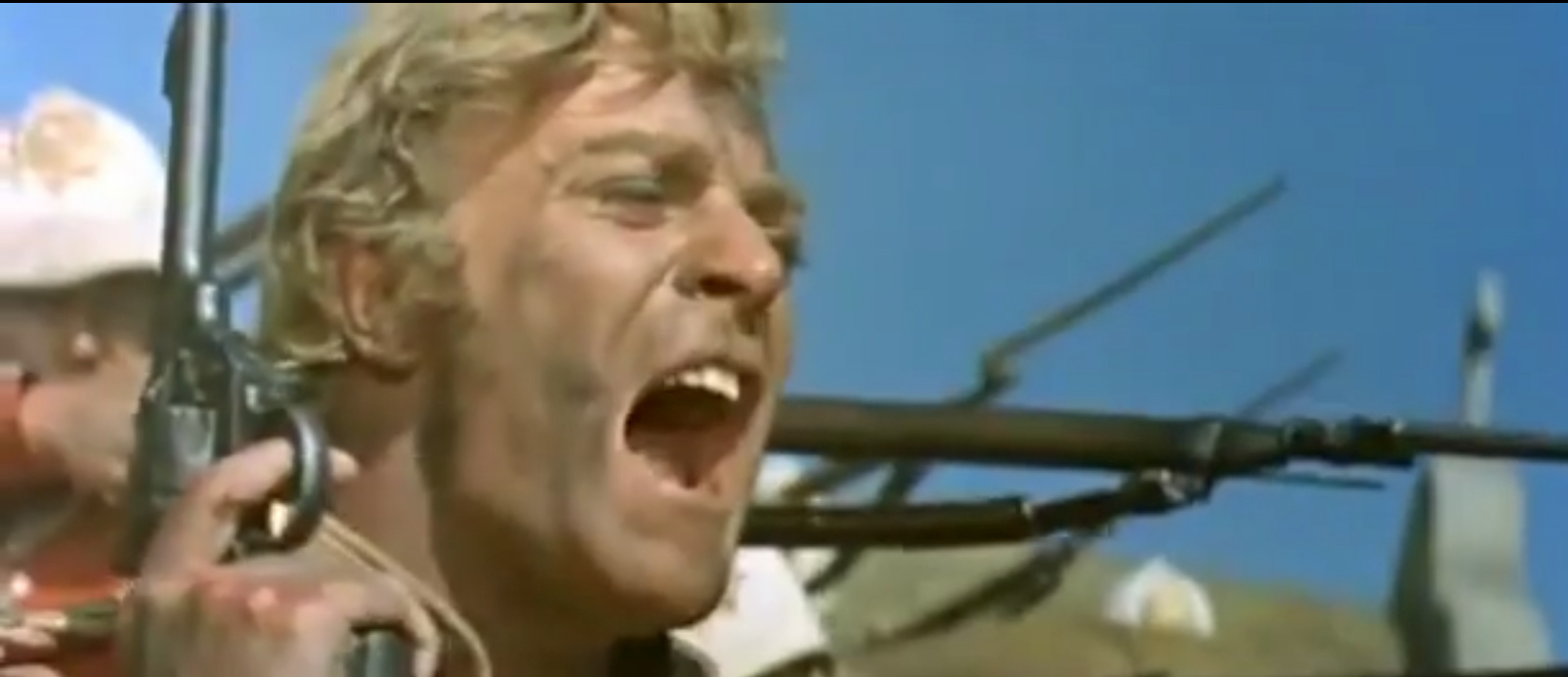
Caine as he appears in the trailer

Michael Caine, who was primarily playing bit parts at this early stage in his career, was originally up for the role of Private Henry Hook, which went to James Booth. According to Caine, he was extremely nervous during his screen test for the part of Bromhead. Director Cy Endfield told him that it was the worst screen test he had ever seen, but they cast Caine in the part anyway because the production was leaving for South Africa shortly and they had not found anyone else for the role. Caine said that he was fortunate that the film was directed by an American (Endfield), because "no English director would've cast me as an officer, I promise you, not one," due to his Cockney roots. Most officers at the time were from upper-class families. Caine later said "My entire movie career is based on the length of the bar at the Prince of Wales Theatre, because I was on my way out [after failing to get the part auditioned for] and it was a very long walk to the door. And I had just got there, when he called out: 'Come back!'

The company was unable to obtain enough historically authentic Martini-Henry rifles for all of the extras, and had to make up the difference with later Lee Enfields. These have a very noticeable moving bolt on the right side, absent on the Martini-Henry. The sidearms used were also visibly later types, World War I-vintage Webley Mk VI revolvers.

The budget of the film has been the subject of some speculation. Press-related figures of $3 million and even $3.5 million were mentioned upon the picture's American release. Joseph E. Levine later revealed that Stanley Baker had approached him with a script and budget in 1962, just after filming Sodom and Gomorrah. Levine agreed to finance the picture up to $2 million. According to the records of the British completion bond company, Film Finance, Ltd., the production eventually finalized its budget at £666,554 (approximately, $1,720,000). This included a contingency amount of £82,241, of which only £34,563 had been used by the time the picture had all but wrapped post-production (Cost Report #15, 18 October 1963). This would have placed the near-final negative cost at £618,876 (approximately $1,600,000).

== Historical accuracy ==
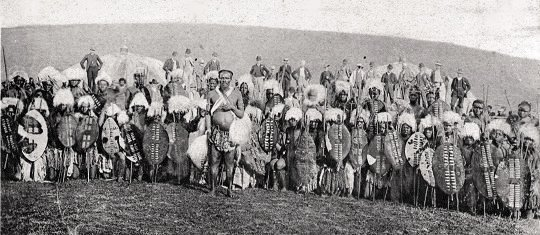
Historical picture of Zulu warriors from about the same time as the events depicted in Zulu

The basic premises of the film are true and largely accurate, but some characters are fictionalised or bear little resemblance to their real life counterparts. The vastly outnumbered British did successfully defend Rorke's Drift, more or less as portrayed in the film. Writer and director Cy Endfield consulted a Zulu tribal historian for information from Zulu oral tradition about the attack. Some events are created for dramatic effect.

=== The regiment ===
- The film presents the 24th Regiment of Foot as a predominantly Welsh regiment, which was not the case in 1879. Of the soldiers present at Rorke's Drift, 49 were English, 32 Welsh, 16 Irish and 22 others of indeterminate ethnicity. While the regiment had been based at Brecon, Wales for several years, its full name at the time was 24th (2nd Warwickshire) Regiment of Foot. (In 1881, the regiment assumed its later name of South Wales Borderers.)
- The song "Men of Harlech" features prominently as the regimental song; it did not achieve that status until later. At the time of the battle, the regimental song was "The Warwickshire Lad". No "battlefield singing contest" took place between the British and the Zulu.

=== The Witts ===
The historical record concerning the Swedish missionaries, the Witts, has inconsistencies, though the minister in the film is portrayed quite differently than the historical Witt. The real man was younger, married and with children, a teetotaler and not a pacifist. Otto Witt's wife and children were 30 kilometres (19 mi) away at the time of the battle. No pacifist, Witt had co-operated closely with the British Army and earlier negotiated a lease to put Rorke's Drift at Lord Chelmsford's disposal. Witt clarified that he did not oppose British intervention against King Cetshwayo. Witt had stayed at Rorke's Drift because he wished "to take part in the defence of my own house and at the same time in the defence of an important place for the whole colony, yet my thoughts went to my wife and to my children, who were at a short distance from there, and did not know anything of what was going on". On the morning of the battle, Otto Witt, with the chaplain, George Smith, and Surgeon-Major James Henry Reynolds, had ascended Shiyane (Oscarberg), the large hill near the station, and noticed the approach of the large Zulu force across the Buffalo River. Given his family at a distance, he left on horseback before the battle in order to join them.

=== The men of the regiment ===
- Lieutenant Gonville Bromhead, VC, is implied in the film to have first seen combat at Rorke's Drift. In fact, though his combat experience was limited, Rorke's Drift was not his first engagement
- Private Henry Hook, VC, is depicted as a rogue with a penchant for alcohol; in fact, he was a model soldier who later was promoted to sergeant; he was also a teetotaller. Historically he had been assigned to the hospital specifically to guard the building. The real Hook's daughters were reportedly so disgusted at his portrayal that they walked out of the 1964 London premiere; a campaign was organized to have Hook's documented historical reputation restored. The film's producers said they chose Hook by chance and created the character as seen in the film, simply because "they wanted an anti-hero who would come good under pressure".
- Corporal William Allen is depicted as a model soldier; historically he had recently been demoted from sergeant for drunkenness.
- Colour Sergeant Frank Bourne (1854–1945) is a middle-aged, big and hardened veteran. In fact, he was of modest stature and, aged 24, the youngest colour sergeant in the British Army. He was called "The Kid" by his men.

=== Battle ===
The Zulu did not sing a song saluting fellow warriors and departed at the approach of the British relief column. This sequence has been both praised for showing the Zulus in a positive light and treating them and the British as equals, and criticised as undermining any anti-imperial message of the film.

== Reception ==
=== Critical ===
On its initial release in 1964, Zulu received acclaim from critics. Bosley Crowther of The New York Times wrote that "if you're not too squeamish at the sight of slaughter and blood and can keep your mind fixed on the notion that there was something heroic and strong about British colonial expansion in the 19th century, you may find a great deal of excitement in this robustly Kiplingesque film. For certainly the fellows who made it, Cy Endfield and Stanley Baker, have done about as nifty a job of realizing on the formula as one could do." Variety praised the "intelligent screenplay" and "high allround standard of acting," concluding, "High grade technical qualities round off a classy production."

Richard L. Coe of The Washington Post wrote that the film was "in the much-missed tradition of 'Beau Geste' and 'Four Feathers.' It has a restrained, leisurely tension, the heroics are splendidly stiff-upper-lip and such granite worthies as Stanley Baker and Jack Hawkins head the cast."

Whitney Balliett of The New Yorker wrote that the film had "not only refurbished all the clichés of the genre but given them the sheen of high style ... It has already been pointed out that 'Zulu' is in poor taste. But so are such invaluable relics as G. A. Henty and Rider Haggard and Kipling." The Monthly Film Bulletin called Zulu "a typically fashionable war film, paying dutiful lip service to the futility of the slaughter while milking it for thrills. And the battle, which occupies the whole second half of the film, is unquestionably thrilling ... But whenever there is a pause in the action the script plunges relentlessly into bathos, with feuding officers, comic other ranks, and all the other trappings of British War Film Mark I, which one had hoped were safely obsolete."

Caine's performance won him praise from reviewers. His next film role would be as the star of The Ipcress File, in which he was reunited with Nigel Green.

=== Box office ===
The film was one of the biggest box-office hits of all time in the British market. For the next 12 years, it remained in constant cinema circulation before its first television appearance. It became a television perennial and remains beloved by the British public.

=== Later critical appraisal ===
Rotten Tomatoes gives a score of 97% based on reviews from 29 critics, with an average rating of 7.7/10. The consensus summarizes: "Zulu patiently establishes a cast of colorful characters and insurmountable stakes before unleashing its white-knuckle spectacle, delivering an unforgettable war epic in the bargain." Metacritic, which uses a weighted average, assigned the film a score of 77 out of 100, based on 9 critics, indicating "generally favorable" reviews.

Among more modern assessments, Robin Clifford of Reeling Reviews gave the film four out of five stars, while Brazilian reviewer Pablo Villaça of Cinema em Cena (Cinema Scene) gave the film three stars out of five. Dennis Schwartz of Ozus Movie Reviews praised Caine's performance, calling it "one of his most splendid hours on film" and graded the film 'A'.

When released in Apartheid South Africa in 1964, the film was banned for black audiences (as the government feared that its scenes of blacks killing whites might incite them to violence). The government allowed a few special screenings for its Zulu extras in Durban and some smaller Kwazulu towns.

By 2007, critics were polarised over whether the movie was anti-imperialist or racist.

Chris McEneany gave the film 8 out of 10 stars.

In 2010, Alex von Tunzelmann of The Guardian gave the film a grade of B, saying: "The Zulus are a mystery, the Welsh are misplaced, a Victoria Cross recipient is slandered, and no one has enough facial hair. Nonetheless, Zulu is a brilliantly made dramatisation of Rorke's Drift, and it does a fine job of capturing the spirit for which the battle is remembered."

In 2014, Pat Reid of Empire gave the film four out of five stars, describing Zulu "As a spectacular war film with a powerful moral dimension…Like the defence of Rorke's Drift itself, its legend grows with the passing of time." Cinema Retro released a special issue dedicated to Zulu, which detailed the production and filming of the film. Stating that the film "has lost none of its impact over the years", it praises the battle sequences, calling them "impressively staged" and the portrayal of the Zulus "as noble figures who develop a mutual respect for the British, even as they are trying to kill them". It also praises the "particularly impressive" performances of the supporting cast of Hawkins, Jacobbsson, and Magee.

In a Telegraph article, Will Heaven wrote, "Zulu is a story of real-life heroism seen through the lenses of Victorian propaganda and Hollywood epic cinema. It may not be truthful – but, my God, the result is thrilling."

In regards to the film's attitudes on race, author Daniel O'Brien noted one of the Zulus killing one of their own to protect Witt's daughter, and how Bromhead dismissing the native auxiliaries who died with the column at Isandhlwana, "Damn the levies man – more cowardly blacks", is reprimanded by Adendorff.

In 2018, Chief Mangosuthu Buthelezi defended the film's cultural and historical merits, stating that there's a "...deep respect that develops between the warring armies, and the nobility of King Cetshwayo's warriors as they salute the enemy, demanded a different way of thinking from the average viewer at the time of the film's release. Indeed, it remains a film that demands a thoughtful response." Buthelezi, with whom Baker had become friends during production, described Baker as "the finest white man he had ever met".

In 2025, The Hollywood Reporter listed Zulu as having the best stunts of 1964.

=== Awards and honours ===
Ernest Archer was nominated for a BAFTA Award for Best Colour Art Direction on the film. The magazine Total Film (2004) ranked Zulu the 37th greatest British movie of all time, and it was ranked eighth in the British television programme The 100 Greatest War Films. Empire magazine ranked Zulu 351st on their list of the 500 greatest films.

== Presentation format ==
Zulu was filmed in Technirama and intended for presentation in Super Technirama 70, as shown on the prints. In the UK, however, the only 70mm screening was a press show prior to release. While the vast majority of cinemas would have played the film in 35mm anyway, the Plaza's West End screenings were of the 35mm anamorphic version as well rather than, as might have been expected, a 70mm print. This was due to the UK's film quota regulations, which demanded that cinemas show 30% British films during the calendar year, but the regulations only applied to 35mm presentations. By 1964, the number of British films available at cinemas like the Plaza could be limited, and Zulu gave them several weeks of British quota qualification if they were played in 35mm. In other countries, the public got to see films in 70mm.

== Home video releases ==
In the US, a LaserDisc release by The Criterion Collection retains the original stereophonic soundtrack taken from a 70mm print.

An official DVD release (with a mono soundtrack as the original stereo tracks were not available) was later issued by StudioCanal through Metro-Goldwyn-Mayer. The film was released on Blu-ray in the UK in 2008; this version is region-free. On 22 January 2014, the 50th anniversary of the film and the 135th anniversary of the actual battle, Twilight Time issued a limited-edition Blu-ray of Zulu in the US with John Barry's score as an isolated track.

== Merchandising ==
- A soundtrack album by John Barry featuring one side of the film score music and one side of "Zulu Stamp" was released on Ember Records in the UK and United Artists Records outside the Commonwealth.
- The choreographer Lionel Blair arranged a dance called the "Zulu Stamp" for Barry's instrumentals.
- A comic book by Dell Comics was released to coincide with the film that features scenes and stills not in the completed film.
- Conte toy soldiers and playsets decorated with artwork and stills from the film were produced.

== Prequel ==
Endfield later wrote Zulu Dawn (1979), a prequel to the original film, depicting the Battle of Isandlwana. The battle's aftermath was shown at the start of the first film.

Baker and Endfield would later make The Sands of the Kalahari in South Africa.

== In popular culture ==
- The Battle of Helm's Deep sequence in Peter Jackson's The Lord of the Rings: The Two Towers was filmed in a manner deliberately reminiscent of Zulu.
- Stanley Baker purchased John Chard's Victoria Cross in 1972, believing it to be a replica. After Baker's death, it was sold to a collector at a low price but found to be a genuine medal.

== See also ==
- BFI Top 100 British films (1999)
- Cape Colonial Forces
- Colony of Natal
- Sir Henry Bartle Edward Frere, 1st Baronet
- Henry Herbert, 4th Earl of Carnarvon
- History of Cape Colony from 1870 to 1899
- Kaffir (Historical usage in southern Africa)
- British Kaffraria
- Kaffraria
- List of conflicts in Africa
- Martini-Henry
- Military history of South Africa
- Scramble for Africa
- Shaka Zulu (TV series)
- Xhosa Wars (also known as the Cape Frontier Wars or "Africa's 100 Years War")
- Zulu Kingdom
- Zulu War

== Bibliography ==
- Rorke's Drift Revisited - A New Account of the Most Famous Battle of the Anglo-Zulu War = Dr Adrian Greaves publisher Pen & Sword Military 2025 ISBN 978-1-0361-2215-7
- Dutton, Roy (2010). Forgotten Heroes: Zulu & Basuto Wars including Complete Medal Roll. Infodial. ISBN 978-0-95565-544-9.
- Hall, Sheldon (2005). Zulu: With Some Guts Behind It: The Making of the Epic Movie. Sheffield, England: Tomahawk. ISBN 978-0-95319-2-663.
- David Rattray's Guidebook to the Anglo-Zulu War edition = 1st ed David Rattray & Dr Adrian Greaves publisher Jonathan Ball Publishers year 2003 ISBN 978-1-86842-174-9
- Morris, Donald R. (1998). The Washing of the Spears: The Rise and Fall of the Zulu Nation (2nd ed.). Da Capo Press. ISBN 978-0-30680-8-661.
