= The Roll Call =

1874 painting by Elizabeth Thompson, Lady Butler

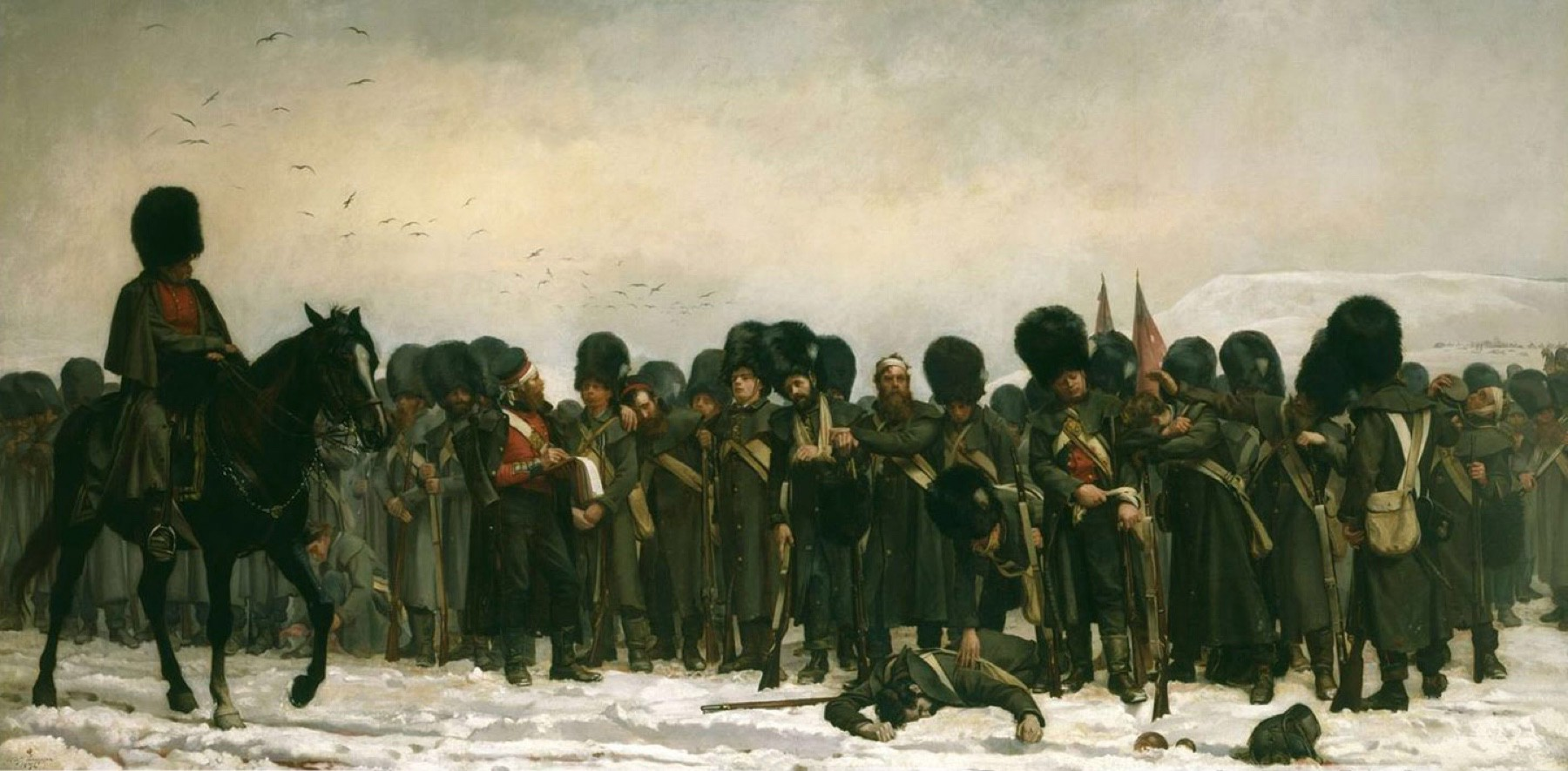
- Artist: Elizabeth Thompson
- Year: 1874
- Medium: oil on canvas
- Dimensions: 93.3 cm × 183.5 cm (36.7 in × 72.2 in)
- Location: The Royal Collection

The Roll Call, full title, Calling the Roll After An Engagement, Crimea is an oil-on-canvas painting by Elizabeth Thompson, Lady Butler, from 1874. It became one of the most celebrated British paintings of the 19th century. It is held in The Royal Collection.

The painting depicts a roll call of soldiers from the Grenadier Guards during the Crimean War. It was taken to depict an occasion following the Battle of Inkerman in 1854, but was intended to show a more generic scene from the war. An irregular line of private soldiers stand in the snow wearing their greatcoats and bearskins, many clearly exhausted or wounded. One of the privates has slumped forward onto the icy ground. An officer on horseback watches while a sergeant marks his muster roll.

The painting has a highly finished surface, reflecting Thompson's academic training, but she eschewed the traditional pyramidal composition of history paintings focusing on one prominent individual, such as Benjamin West's The Death of General Wolfe or John Singleton Copley's The Death of Major Pierson, in favour of a more democratic linear arrangement, emphasising the common soldier. The coldness of the winter is evoked by the dominant tones of black, grey, white and brown, contrasting with small splashes of red from coatees and flags. It measures 93.3 × 183.5 centimetres (36.7 × 72.2 in).

== History ==
After having read parts of Alexander William Kinglake's Invasion of the Crimea, Thompson painted studies of Crimean veterans in 1873 before working on the larger painting. Thompson—then 26 years old and almost unknown—submitted the painting to the Royal Academy for exhibition at the Royal Academy summer exhibition in 1874. The work was received very favourably: the selection committee applauded when it was unveiled and Butler received a standing ovation from fellow artists on varnishing day. The painting became very popular when it went on show at eye level in the prestigious Gallery Two; Butler wrote that she awoke and "found myself famous". A policeman was detailed to stand by a railing to keep the crowds back (only the third time this step had been necessary, after David Wilkie's The Chelsea Pensioners reading the Waterloo Dispatch in 1822 and William Powell Frith's The Derby Day in 1858). Butler's painting was also singled out by Prince Albert in his speech at the Academy Banquet.

The painting toured the country, attracting large crowds. Artist William Holman Hunt noted in his book Pre-Raphaelitism that "it touched the nation's heart as few pictures have ever done".

The work had been commissioned for £100 by Charles Galloway, a Manchester industrialist. However, Queen Victoria insisted that she should buy it, and the work remains in the Royal Collection.

Lady Butler developed a reputation for her military pictures after the favourable reception of this painting. It was followed by a series of military paintings, Quatre Bras in 1875, and then two more Crimean paintings, Balaclava and The Return from Inkerman, exhibited at the Fine Art Society in 1876 and 1877. These were followed in 1879 by Remnants of an Army and in 1881 her most famous work, Scotland Forever!.

In 1879, Butler came within two votes of becoming the first woman to be elected as an Associate Member of the Royal Academy (apart from two founder Members, Mary Moser and Angelica Kauffman; ultimately, the first female Associate Member was Annie Swynnerton, elected in 1922, and the first full Member was Laura Knight in 1936).

== In popular culture ==
The painting is the subject of the first episode of Malcolm Gladwell's 2016 podcast, Revisionist History, in an episode entitled "The Lady Vanishes".
