= New Zealand Cyclist Corps =

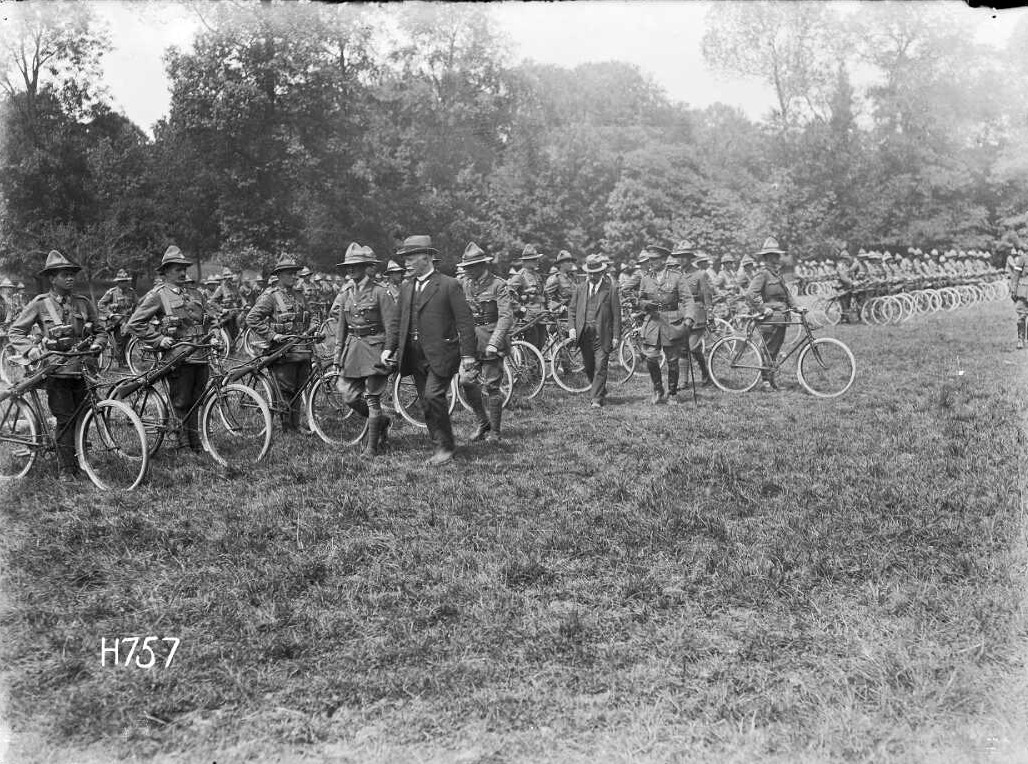
- Prime minister Massey reviewing the XXII Corps Cyclist Battalion, July 1918
- Active: 1916-1919
- Country: New Zealand
- Allegiance: British Empire
- Role: Bicycle infantry
- Size: 3 companies
- Part of: New Zealand Expeditionary Force
- Equipment: BSA Bicycle Mk. IV
- Engagements: First World War: Western Front

Commanders
- Notable commanders: Charles Evans

Insignia
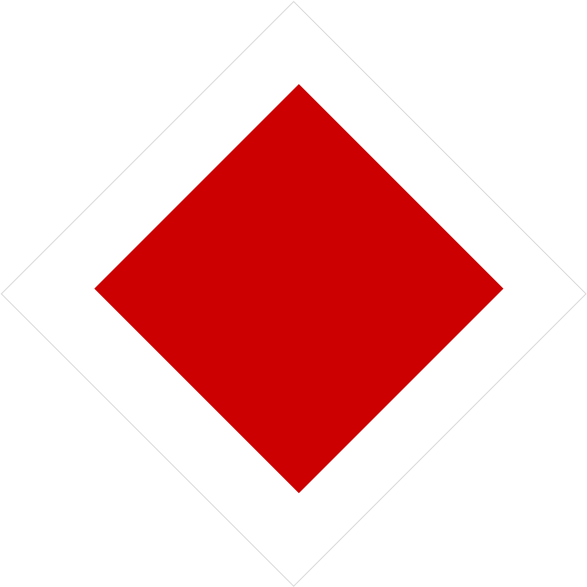
- Distinguishing patch

The New Zealand Cyclist Corps was an administrative corps of the New Zealand Military Forces during the First World War. It was formed in April 1916, initially as a single company, but by 1918 had been expanded to a battalion of three companies. The cyclists saw action on the Western Front, but were controlled at corps level and generally did not fight with the New Zealand Division. The New Zealand Cyclist Corps was disbanded at the end of the war.

== History ==
Following the evacuation from Gallipoli, the New Zealand Division was formed and following new British doctrine was organised to have a company of cyclists. The 1st New Zealand Cyclist Company was formed in April 1916 at Trentham camp from men who had been training to join the New Zealand Mounted Rifles.

The cyclists arrived on the Western Front in July 1916, but by this time it had instead been decided to from a cyclist battalion controlled at corps level. The New Zealand company was subsequently used to form No. 1 and No. 2 companies of II ANZAC Corps Cyclist Battalion, while the No. 3 company was formed from the Australian 5th Divisional Cyclist Company. Each company was organised into three platoons and the battalion had a nominal strength of 326 (16 officers and 310 other ranks), roughly a third the strength of an infantry battalion.

The theoretical mobility of the cyclists was of little value on the western front were static trench warfare had set in. Although II ANZAC Corps Cyclist Battalion spent some time in the front line trenches and conducted raids against German positions, it primarily provided working parties for infrastructural work. In particular, the cyclists were regularly tasked with laying telephone cables in deep trenches to avoid cutting of the wire by artillery fire. Over the course of the war, the battalion laid a total of 5600 miles of telephone cables in trenches dug to 6–8 feet deep. The cyclists were engaged in such work during the Battle of Passchendaele, while during the Battle of Messines they were tasked with clearing a track through no-mans land for the Otago Mounted Rifles to advance through.

From January 1917 the cyclists were provided with two Lewis guns per company (six per battalion). Later in July the battalion was restructured with 4 platoons per company, but with only a small increase in nominal strength to 338 (15 officers and 323 other ranks). A larger shake up came in November 1917 with the centralisation of the Australian divisions under the newly formed Australian Corps. II ANZAC Corps was retitled as XXII Corps and subsequently the cyclists battalion was also renamed as XXII Corps Cyclist Battalion. Later in January 1918 the Australian personnel of No.3 company were transferred to the Australian corps and a new No. 3 company was formed from New Zealanders.

The German spring offensive was launched in March 1918 and the Cyclists were used to form part of a composite infantry battalion with the XXII Corps Mounted Regiment (itself a composite regiment of the Australian 4th Light Horse and New Zealand Otago Mounted Rifles). The battalion was attached to the British 49th Division and were used to hold the line near Ypres until mid-April.

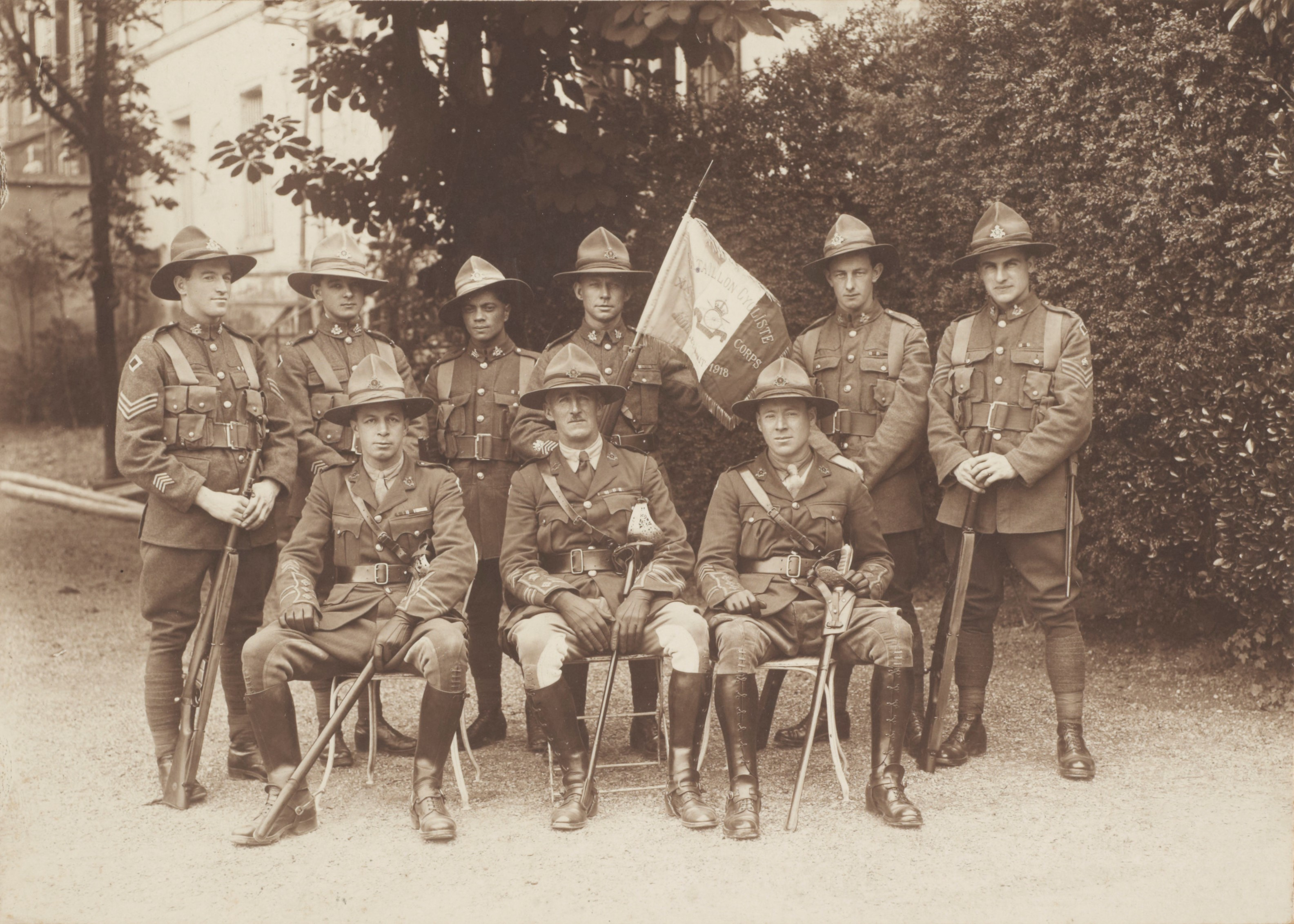
New Zealand Cyclists with the fanion awarded to them by General Berthelot, 1919

In July the cyclists were used for the first time in an offensive role, assaulting the village of Marfaux during the Second Battle of the Marne. The cyclists took 91 casualties during the attack, but captured 100 German prisoners, a battery of 75mm guns and several machine guns. The battalions commanding officer, Charles Evans, was subsequently awarded the French Legion of Honour for this action.

In September 1918 the nationality of XXII Corps Cyclist Battalion was finally recognised and the unit was retitled as the New Zealand Cyclist Battalion. Following the armistice in November, the battalion remained in Belgium until it was disbanded in March 1919.

Although the New Zealand Cyclist Corps had been disbanded, in July 1919 representatives of the unit were invited to Épernay for the anniversary of the Second Battle of the Marne. In recognition of their service, the cyclists were presented with a fanion by General Berthelot.

During the war the cyclists suffered 59 men killed and 259 wounded.

== See also ==
- Army Cyclist Corps
- Australian Cycling Corps
