= Australian Cycling Corps =

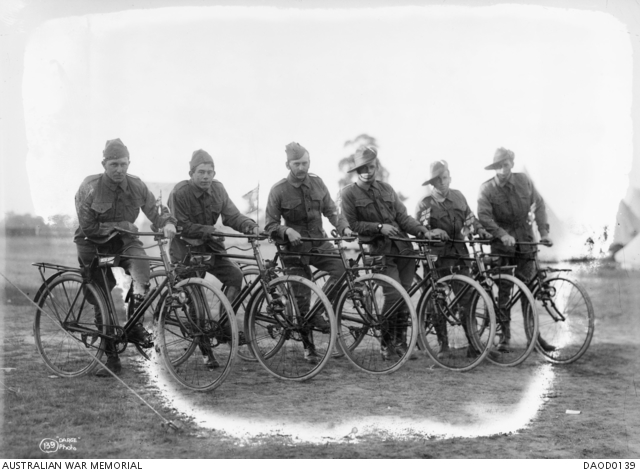
- Members of the corps at Broadmeadows, Victoria, in early 1915
- Active: 1916–19
- Country: Australia
- Branch: Australian Army
- Role: Reconnaissance
- Size: ~1–2 battalions
- Part of: Australian Imperial Force
- Engagements: World War I: Western Front

The Australian Cycling Corps was formed in Egypt in 1916 as part of the Australian Imperial Force (AIF), and fought on the Western Front in France and Belgium during World War I. They were used mainly as despatch riders, while also conducting reconnaissance and patrolling. It was disbanded in 1919.

== History ==
When the Australian Imperial Force (AIF) was reorganised and expanded in Egypt in 1916 following its evacuation from Gallipoli, each of its five infantry divisions was allocated a company of cyclists in accordance with the British New Army establishment adopted at that time. At this time each company had an establishment of a headquarters and six cycle platoons with a total strength of 204 men. These companies were formed in March and April 1916 from volunteers from other AIF units in the Middle East. However, following their arrival in France, they were subsequently reorganised as corps troops, with the 1st and 2nd Cyclist Battalions being formed and attached to the I and II ANZAC Corps respectively in May and July. (Note: The 1st and 2nd Division Cyclist Companies formed the basis of the I ANZAC Corps Cyclist Battalion, with the 4th Division Cyclist Company being broken up and returned to their original battalions. The 5th Division Cyclist Company was merged with the New Zealand Cyclist Company to form the II ANZAC Corps Cyclist Battalion. Meanwhile, the 3rd Division Cyclist Company was disbanded while still in England and its men sent to reinforce the 3rd Division.) Meanwhile, a Cyclist Training Company was also formed in England. The 2nd Battalion included two companies of New Zealanders, and was commanded mostly by New Zealand officers. The establishment of each battalion included a headquarters and three companies, each of three platoons with a total of 26 officers and 310 other ranks.

The cyclist battalions were organised like the infantry, and were mainly used as despatch riders. Later, during the periods of semi-open warfare in 1917 and 1918 they operated in a manner similar to cavalry, conducting reconnaissance and patrolling. However, the nature of trench warfare and the mud and rubble that was often encountered on the battlefield meant that they were mostly unsuited to this role. Other tasks performed included laying communications cabling, traffic control, unloading stores from railway wagons, harvesting crops, and burial of the dead. The soldiers were equipped with a variety of bicycle models made by the Birmingham Small Arms Company, ranging from the Mark I to the Mark IV, and were issued the standard Short Magazine Lee Enfield (SMLE) rifle, which was either attached to the bicycle's down tube, or slung across their back. Lewis guns were also used.

Following the formation of the Australian Corps in 1917, the II ANZAC Corps became the XXII Corps. As a result, in March 1918 the 1st Cyclist Battalion was assigned to the Australian Corps, while the Australian personnel serving in the 2nd Cyclist Battalion were returned to other units of the AIF (mainly artillery and infantry) as reinforcements and the remaining New Zealand personnel were used to form the XXII Corps Cycle Battalion. (Note: In September 1918 the XXII Corps Cyclist Battalion was renamed the New Zealand Cyclist Battalion.) Although the battalions were not used as fighting units, their personnel were regularly exposed to the dangers of artillery fire and attacks by hostile aircraft. However, cyclist detachments were used in the last stages of the war, as the German Army withdrew to the Hindenburg Line. During the war the 1st Cyclist Battalion lost 13 men killed, while the 2nd Cyclist Battalion lost 59 dead. (Note: These figures apparently include both Australian and New Zealand personnel. According to Austin, Australian casualties were nine killed in action or died of wounds, 17 dead from illness, disease or accident, 55 wounded and 37 gassed, while the New Zealanders lost 64 dead, including 59 killed in action, and 259 wounded.) The Australian Corps Cyclist Battalion was disbanded on 30 April 1919. Approximately 3,000 men served in the Australian Cycling Corps, although many probably did not serve in operational units.

== Units ==
The corps consisted of the following units:

- 1st Division Cyclist Company (1916)
- 2nd Division Cyclist Company (1916)
- 3rd Division Cyclist Company (1916)
- 4th Division Cyclist Company (1916)
- 5th Division Cyclist Company (1916)
- I ANZAC Corps Cyclist Battalion (1916–18)
- II ANZAC Corps Cyclist Battalion (1916–18)
- Australian Corps Cyclist Battalion (1918–19)

== See also ==
- Army Cyclist Corps
- Bicycle infantry

== Notes ==
Footnotes

Citations
