= Gallipoli campaign order of battle =

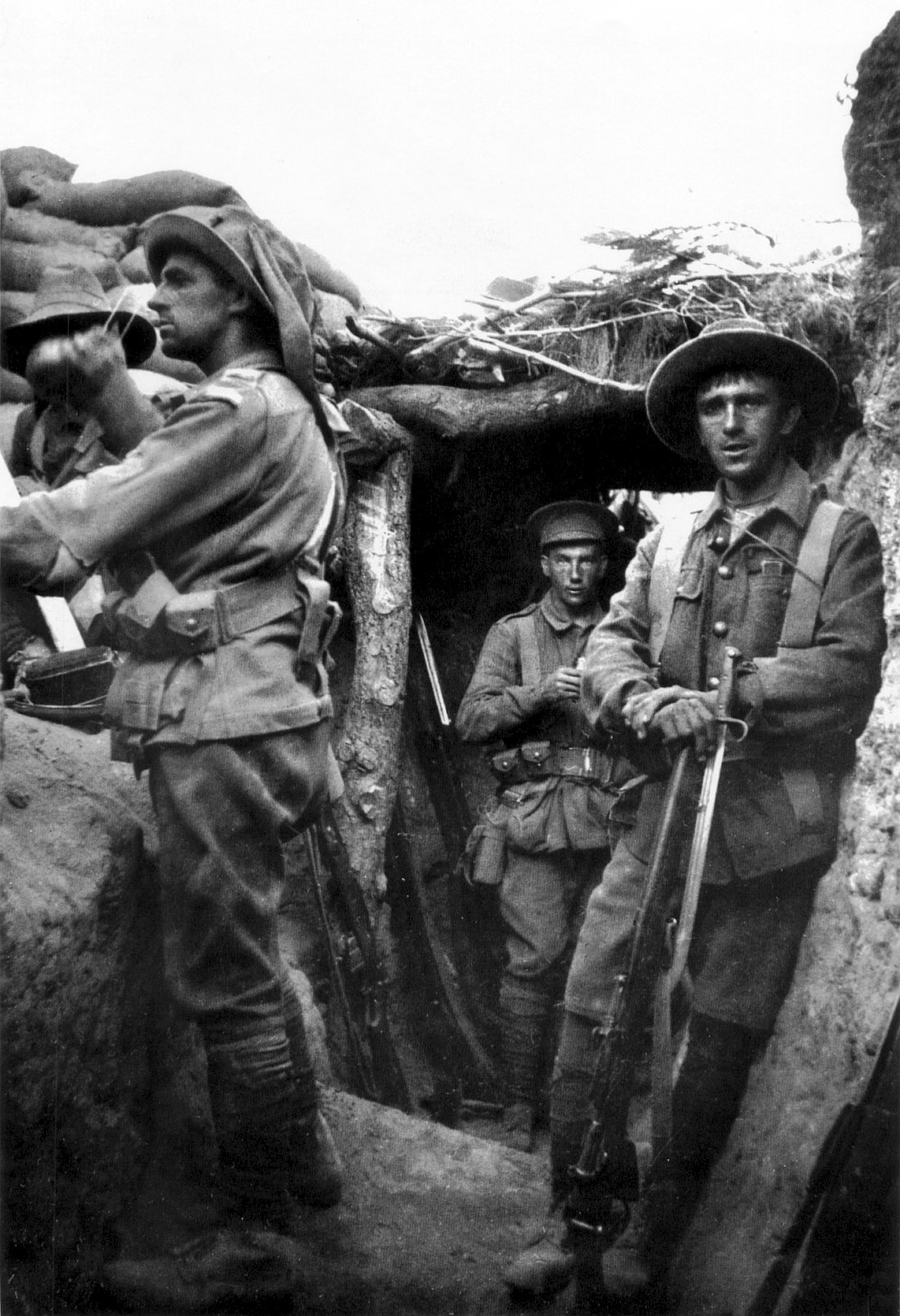
Australian soldiers from the 1st Infantry Brigade at Lone Pine, 6 August 1915

This is an order of battle listing the Allied and Ottoman forces involved in the Gallipoli campaign during 1915.

== Allied forces ==
=== Initial landings, 25 April 1915 ===
Mediterranean Expeditionary Force

- Commander-in-Chief: Gen. Sir Ian Hamilton
- Chief of the General Staff: Maj-Gen. W. P. Braithwaite
- Deputy Adjutant-General: Br-Gen. E. M. Woodward
- Deputy Quartermaster-General: Br-Gen. S. H. Winter

29th Division

- Major-General A. G. Hunter-Weston
- 86th Brigade:
  - 2nd Battalion, Royal Fusiliers
  - 1st Battalion, Lancashire Fusiliers
  - 1st Battalion, Royal Munster Fusiliers
  - 1st Battalion, Royal Dublin Fusiliers
- 87th Brigade:
  - 2nd Battalion, South Wales Borderers
  - 1st Battalion, King's Own Scottish Borderers
  - 1st Battalion, Royal Inniskilling Fusiliers
  - 1st Battalion, Border Regiment
- 88th Brigade:
  - 4th Battalion, Worcestershire Regiment
  - 2nd Battalion, Hampshire Regiment
  - 1st Battalion, Essex Regiment
  - 5th Battalion, Royal Scots
- XV Brigade, Royal Horse Artillery (B, L & Y Batteries)
- XVII Brigade, Royal Field Artillery (13th, 26th & 92nd Batteries)
- CXLVII Brigade, Royal Field Artillery (10th, 97th & 368th Batteries)
- 460th (Howitzer) Battery, Royal Field Artillery
- 4th Highland (Mountain) Brigade, Royal Garrison Artillery (TF) (Argyllshire Battery and Ross & Cromarty Battery)
- 90th Heavy Battery, Royal Garrison Artillery
- 14th Siege Battery, Royal Garrison Artillery
- 1/2nd London, 1/2nd Lowland & 1/1st W. Riding Field Companies, Royal Engineers (TF)
- Divisional Cyclist Company

Royal Naval Division

- Major-General Archibald Paris
- 1st (Naval) Brigade
  - Drake Battalion
  - Nelson Battalion
  - Deal Battalion, Royal Marine Light Infantry
- 2nd (Naval) Brigade
  - Howe Battalion
  - Hood Battalion
  - Anson Battalion
- 3rd (RM) Brigade
  - Chatham Battalion, Royal Marine Light Infantry
  - Portsmouth Battalion, Royal Marine Light Infantry
  - Plymouth Battalion, Royal Marine Light Infantry
- Motor Maxim Squadron (Royal Naval Air Service)
- 1st & 2nd Field Companies, RN Divisional Engineers
- Divisional Cyclist Company

Australian and New Zealand Army Corps

- G.O.C: Lieutenant-General Sir W. Birdwood

1st Australian Division

- Major-General W. T. Bridges
- 1st Australian Brigade:
  - 1st (New South Wales) Battalion
  - 2nd (New South Wales) Battalion
  - 3rd (New South Wales) Battalion
  - 4th (New South Wales) Battalion
- 2nd Australian Brigade:
  - 5th (Victoria) Battalion
  - 6th (Victoria) Battalion
  - 7th (Victoria) Battalion
  - 8th (Victoria) Battalion
- 3rd Australian Brigade:
  - 9th (Queensland) Battalion
  - 10th (South Australia) Battalion
  - 11th (Western Australia) Battalion
  - 12th (South & Western Australia and Tasmania) Battalion
- I (New South Wales) Field Artillery Brigade (1st, 2nd & 3rd Batteries)
- II (Victoria) Field Artillery Brigade (4th, 5th & 6th Batteries)
- III (Queensland) Field Artillery Brigade (7th, 8th & 9th Batteries)
- 1st, 2nd & 3rd Field Companies, Royal Australian Engineers

New Zealand and Australian Division

- Major-General Sir A. Godley
- New Zealand Infantry Brigade
  - Auckland Battalion
  - Wellington Battalion
  - Canterbury Battalion
  - Otago Battalion
- 4th Australian Brigade
  - 13th (New South Wales) Battalion
  - 14th (Victoria) Battalion
  - 15th (Queensland & Tasmania) Battalion
  - 16th (South & Western Australia) Battalion
- New Zealand Field Artillery Brigade
  - 1st Field Battery
  - 2nd Field Battery
  - 3rd Field Battery
  - 4th (Howitzer) Field Battery
- Field Company, New Zealand Engineers

ANZAC Corps Troops

- 7th Indian Mountain Artillery Brigade (21st [Kohat] Battery and 26th [Jacob's] Battery)
- Ceylon Planters' Rifle Corps

Corps expéditionnaire d'Orient

- Commander: Général Albert d'Amade

1^{re} Division

- Général Masnou
- Brigade métropolitaine
  - 175^{e} Régiment d’infanterie
  - Régiment de marche d'Afrique (2 Zouave battalions, 1 battalion of Légion étrangère)
- Brigade coloniale
  - 4^{e} Régiment d’infanterie coloniale (2 Senegalese battalions, 1 colonial battalion)
  - 6^{e} Régiment d’infanterie coloniale (2 Senegalese battalions, 1 colonial battalion)
- 6 artillery batteries (75mm)
- 2 mountain artillery batteries (65mm) (Note: Appendix 1 of the French official history (AFGG 8,1) has a four page table listing the units of the C.E.O. at its departure on 4 March 1915. Appendix 2 has a four page breakout of the transport vessels and units aboard.)

=== August 1915 ===
- (United Kingdom) 'Mediterranean Expeditionary Force' (General Sir Ian Hamilton)
  - VIII Corps (Lieutenant General Sir Francis Davies)
    - 29th Division (as above)
    - 42nd (East Lancashire) Division (TF)
      - 125th (Lancashire Fusiliers) Brigade
        - 1/5th Battalion, Lancashire Fusiliers
        - 1/6th Battalion, Lancashire Fusiliers
        - 1/7th Battalion, Lancashire Fusiliers
        - 1/8th Battalion, Lancashire Fusiliers
      - 126th (East Lancashire) Brigade
        - 1/4th Battalion, East Lancashire Regiment
        - 1/5th Battalion, East Lancashire Regiment
        - 1/9th Battalion, Manchester Regiment
        - 1/10th Battalion, Manchester Regiment
      - 127th (Manchester) Brigade
        - 1/5th Battalion, Manchester Regiment
        - 1/6th Battalion, Manchester Regiment
        - 1/7th Battalion, Manchester Regiment
        - 1/8th Battalion, Manchester Regiment
      - 1/I East Lancashire Brigade, RFA (1/4th, 1/5th & 1/6th East Lancashire Btys) – 1/4th & half 1/6th did not arrive until September
      - 1/III East Lancashire Brigade (The Bolton Artillery), RFA (1/18th, 1/19th, 1/20th East Lancashire Btys) – 1/19th & 1/20th did not arrive until September
      - 1/IV East Lancashire (Howitzer) Brigade (The Cumberland Artillery), RFA (1/1st, 1/2nd Cumberland (H) Btys)
      - 1/1st & 1/2nd East Lancashire, 1/2nd West Lancashire Field Companies, RE
    - 52nd (Lowland) Division (TF)
      - 155th (South Scottish) Brigade
        - 1/4th Battalion, Royal Scots Fusiliers
        - 1/5th Battalion, Royal Scots Fusiliers
        - 1/4th Battalion, King's Own Scottish Borderers
        - 1/5th Battalion, King's Own Scottish Borderers
      - 156th (Scottish Rifles) Brigade
        - 1/4th Battalion, Royal Scots
        - 1/7th Battalion, Royal Scots
        - 1/7th Battalion, Cameronians (Scottish Rifles)
        - 1/8th Battalion, Cameronians (Scottish Rifles)
      - 157th (Highland Light Infantry) Brigade
        - 1/5th Battalion, Highland Light Infantry
        - 1/6th Battalion, Highland Light Infantry
        - 1/7th (Blythswood) Battalion, Highland Light Infantry
        - 1/5th Battalion, Argyll and Sutherland Highlanders
      - 1/IV Lowland (Howitzer) Brigade, RFA (1/4th, 1/5th City of Glasgow (H) Btys) – detached from division
      - 2/1st & 2/2nd Lowland Field Companies, RE
      - Divisional Cyclist Company
    - Royal Naval Division (as above)
  - IX Corps (Lieutenant General Frederick Stopford)
    - 10th (Irish) Division
      - 29th Brigade
        - 6th Battalion, Royal Irish Rifles
        - 5th Battalion, Connaught Rangers
        - 6th Battalion, Prince of Wales's Leinster Regiment (Royal Canadians)
        - 10th Battalion, Hampshire Regiment
      - 30th Brigade
        - 6th Battalion, Royal Munster Fusiliers
        - 7th Battalion, Royal Munster Fusiliers
        - 6th Battalion, Royal Dublin Fusiliers
        - 7th Battalion, Royal Dublin Fusiliers
      - 31st Brigade
        - 5th Battalion, Royal Inniskilling Fusiliers
        - 6th Battalion, Royal Inniskilling Fusiliers
        - 5th Battalion, Princess Victoria's (Royal Irish Fusiliers)
        - 6th Battalion, Princess Victoria's (Royal Irish Fusiliers)
      - Pioneers
        - 5th Battalion, Royal Irish Regiment
      - LV Brigade, RFA (A, B, C & D Btys) – A & C did not arrive until September
      - LVI Brigade, RFA (A, B, C & D Btys) – A & B did not arrive until October
      - LVII (Howitzer) Brigade, RFA (A & D Btys)
      - 65th, 66th & 85th Field Companies, RE
      - Divisional Cyclist Company
    - 11th (Northern) Division
      - 32nd Brigade
        - 9th Battalion, Prince of Wales's Own (West Yorkshire Regiment)
        - 6th Battalion, Alexandra, Princess of Wales Own (Yorkshire Regiment) (Green Howards)
        - 8th Battalion, Duke of Wellington's (West Riding Regiment)
        - 6th Battalion, York and Lancaster Regiment
      - 33rd Brigade
        - 6th Battalion, Lincolnshire Regiment
        - 6th Battalion, Border Regiment
        - 7th Battalion, South Staffordshire Regiment
        - 9th Battalion, Sherwood Foresters (Nottingham and Derbyshire Regiment)
      - 34th Brigade
        - 8th Battalion, Northumberland Fusiliers
        - 9th Battalion, Lancashire Fusiliers
        - 11th Battalion, Manchester Regiment
        - 5th Battalion, Dorsetshire Regiment
      - Pioneers
        - 6th Battalion, East Yorkshire Regiment
      - LVIII Brigade, RFA (A, B, C & D Btys)
      - LIX Brigade, RFA (A, B, C & D Btys)
      - 67th, 68th & 86th Field Companies, RE
      - Divisional Cyclist Company
      - 2nd South Western Mounted Brigade – attached
        - 1/1st Royal 1st Devon Yeomanry
        - 1/1st Royal North Devon Yeomanry
        - 1/1st West Somerset Yeomanry
        - 1/2nd South-Western Signal Troop, RE
        - 1/2nd South-Western Field Ambulance, Royal Army Medical Corps (RAMC)
    - 13th (Western) Division
      - 38th Brigade
        - 6th Battalion, King's Own (Royal Lancaster Regiment)
        - 6th Battalion, East Lancashire Regiment
        - 6th Battalion, Prince of Wales's Volunteers (South Lancashire Regiment)
        - 6th Battalion, Loyal North Lancashire Regiment
      - 39th Brigade
        - 9th Battalion, Royal Warwickshire Regiment
        - 7th Battalion, Gloucestershire Regiment
        - 9th Battalion, Worcestershire Regiment
        - 7th Battalion, Prince of Wales's (North Staffordshire Regiment)
      - 40th Brigade
        - 8th Battalion, Cheshire Regiment
        - 8th Battalion, Royal Welsh Fusiliers
        - 4th Battalion, South Wales Borderers
        - 5th Battalion, Duke of Edinburgh's (Wiltshire Regiment)
      - Pioneers
        - 8th Battalion, Welch Regiment
      - LXVI Brigade, RFA (A, B, C & D Btys)
      - LXIX (Howitzer) Brigade, RFA (A, B, C & D Btys)
      - 71st, 72nd & 88th Field Companies, RE
      - Divisional Cyclist Company
- Corps Troops
  - 1/IV Highland (Mountain) Brigade, RGA (Argyllshire, and Ross & Cromarty Btys)
    - Attached to IX Corps:
      - 53rd (Welsh) Division (TF)
        - 158th (North Wales) Brigade
          - 1/5th (Flintshire) Battalion, Royal Welch Fusiliers
          - 1/6th (Caernarvonshire and Anglesey) Battalion, Royal Welch Fusiliers
          - 1/7th (Merionethshire and Montgomeryshire) Battalion, Royal Welch Fusiliers
          - 1/1st Battalion, Herefordshire Regiment
        - 159th (Cheshire) Brigade
          - 1/4th Battalion, Cheshire Regiment
          - 1/7th Battalion, Cheshire Regiment
          - 1/4th Battalion, Welch Regiment
          - 1/5th Battalion, Welch Regiment
        - 160th Brigade
          - 2/4th Battalion, Queen's (Royal West Surrey) Regiment
          - 1/4th Battalion, Royal Sussex Regiment
          - 2/4th Battalion Royal West Kent Regiment
          - 2/10th Battalion, Middlesex Regiment
        - 1/1st Welsh & 2/1st Cheshire Field Companies, RE
        - Divisional Cyclist Company
      - 54th (East Anglian) Division (TF)
        - 161st (Essex) Brigade
          - 1/4th Battalion, Essex Regiment
          - 1/5th Battalion, Essex Regiment
          - 1/6th Battalion, Essex Regiment
          - 1/7th Battalion, Essex Regiment
        - 162nd (East Midland) Brigade
          - 1/5th Battalion, Bedfordshire Regiment
          - 1/4th Battalion, Northamptonshire Regiment
          - 1/10th (County of London) Battalion (Hackney), London Regiment
          - 1/11th (County of London) Battalion (Finsbury Rifles), London Regiment
        - 163rd (Norfolk & Suffolk) Brigade
          - 1/4th Battalion, Norfolk Regiment
          - 1/5th Battalion, Norfolk Regiment
          - 1/5th Battalion, Suffolk Regiment
          - 1/8th Battalion, Hampshire Regiment
        - 1/2nd Welsh & 2/1st East Anglian Field Companies, RE
        - Divisional Cyclist Company
      - 2nd Mounted Division (TF) – Dismounted
      - 2nd Mounted Division (TF) (Dismounted)
        - 1st (1st South Midland) Mounted Brigade
          - 1/1st Warwickshire Yeomanry
          - 1/1st Royal Gloucestershire Hussars
          - 1/1st Worcestershire Yeomanry
        - 2nd (2nd South Midland) Mounted Brigade
          - 1/1st Royal Buckinghamshire Hussars
          - 1/1st Dorsetshire Yeomanry
          - 1/1st Berkshire Yeomanry
        - 3rd (Nottinghamshire and Derbyshire) Mounted Brigade
          - 1/1st Sherwood Rangers Yeomanry
          - 1/1st South Nottinghamshire Hussars
          - 1/1st Derbyshire Yeomanry
        - 4th (London) Mounted Brigade
          - 1/1st County of London Yeomanry
          - 1/1st City of London Yeomanry (Rough Riders)
          - 1/3rd County of London Yeomanry (Sharpshooters)
        - 5th Mounted Brigade – attached
          - 1/1st Hertfordshire Yeomanry
          - 1/2nd County of London Yeomanry
  - Australian and New Zealand Army Corps (Lieutenant General William Birdwood)
    - Australian 1st Division (as above)
    - Australian 2nd Division
    - New Zealand and Australian Division
      - New Zealand Infantry Brigade
      - 4th Australian Brigade
      - New Zealand Mounted Rifles Brigade
      - 1st Australian Light Horse Brigade
    - Attached:
      - 29th Indian Brigade
        - 14th King George's Own Ferozepore Sikhs
        - 1st Battalion, 5th Gurkha Rifles (Frontier Force)
        - 1st Battalion, 6th Gurkha Rifles
        - 2nd Battalion, 10th Gurkha Rifles
- GHQ Troops
  - 20th Brigade, RGA (10th, 15th & 91st Heavy Btys)
  - Armoured Car Division, Royal Naval Air Service (9, 10 & 11 Squadrons)
  - One aviation wing: No. 3 Wing, Royal Naval Air Service (at Imbros)
  - (France) Oriental Expeditionary Corps (General Maurice Bailloud)
    - 1st Division (as above)
    - 2nd Division
      - 3^{e} Brigade métropolitaine
          - 176^{e} Régiment d’infanterie
          - 2^{e}Régiment de marche d'Afrique (3 Zouave battalions)
      - 4^{e} Brigade coloniale
        - 7^{e} Régiment d’infanterie coloniale
        - 8^{e} Régiment d’infanterie coloniale
      - 9 Batteries (75mm)
    - Corps Troops
      - 1 Heavy Bty (120mm long)
      - 1 Heavy Bty (155mm long)
      - 2 Heavy Btys (155mm short)
      - 2 Siege guns (240mm)
      - Battery of naval guns
      - One aviation squadron: Escadrille MF98T (based at Tenedos) (Note: Appendix 3 of the French official history (AFGG 8,1) has a one page table chronologically listing the units that subsequently joined the C.E.O. at Gallipoli.)

=== Naval forces ===
- British:
  - HMS Agamemnon
  - HMS Albion
  - HMS Canopus
  - HMS Cornwallis
  - HMS Exmouth
  - HMS Glory
  - HMS Hibernia
  - HMS Implacable
  - HMS Irresistible (Sunk)
  - HMS London
  - HMS Lord Nelson
  - HMS Majestic (Sunk)
  - HMS Mars
  - HMS Ocean (Sunk)
  - HMS Prince George
  - HMS Prince of Wales
  - HMS Queen
  - HMS Queen Elizabeth
  - HMS Russell
  - HMS Swiftsure
  - HMS Triumph (Sunk)
  - HMS Venerable
  - HMS Vengeance
  - HMS Zealandia
  - HMS Inflexible
  - HMS Bacchante
  - HMS Blenheim
  - HMS Cornwall
  - HMS Dartmouth
  - HMS Doris
  - HMS Edgar
  - HMS Endymion
  - HMS Europa
  - HMS Euryalus
  - HMS Grafton
  - HMS Talbot
  - HMS Theseus
  - HMS Ark Royal
  - HMS Manica
  - HMS Dublin
  - HMS Goliath (Sunk)
  - HMS Louis (Wrecked)
  - HMAS AE2 (Scuttled)
  - HMS B11
  - HMS E11
  - HMS E14
  - HMS E15
  - HMS E20 (Sunk)
  - SS River Clyde - improvised landing craft
- French:
  - Bouvet (Sunk)
  - Charlemagne
  - Gaulois
  - Henri IV
  - Jules Ferry
  - Massena (Sunk)
  - Saint Louis
  - Suffren
  - Jeanne d'Arc
  - Jurien de la Gravière
  - Kleber
  - Foudre
  - Joule
  - Saphir (Sunk)
  - Turquoise (Sunk)
- Russian:
  - Askold

== Ottoman forces ==
=== Initial landing, 25 April 1915 ===
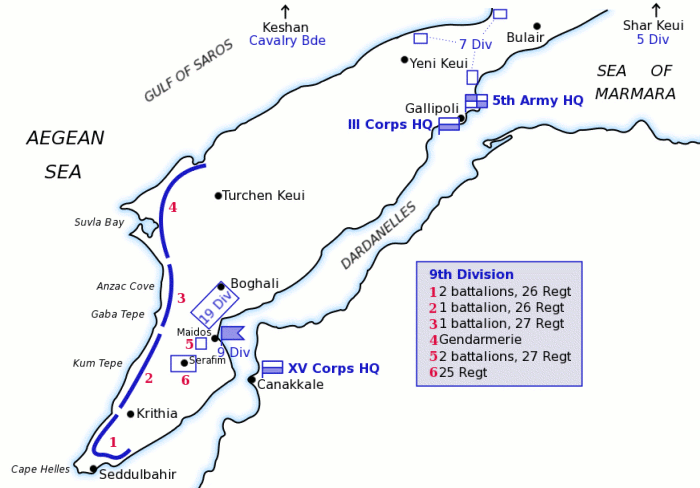
Ottoman dispositions, April 1915

- (Ottoman Empire) Fifth Army (Otto Liman von Sanders)
  - III Corps (Mehmet Esat Bülkat)
    - 7th Division
    - 9th Division
    - 19th Division (Mustafa Kemal Atatürk)
  - XV Corps (Hans Kannengiesser)
    - 3rd Division
    - 11th Division
  - Dardanelles Fortified Area Command
  - One aircraft squadron

Note: When the campaign commenced, the Fifth Army comprised two army Corps:

- the III Corps was defending the Gallipoli peninsula
- and the XV Corps was defending the Asian shore.

In addition, the 5th Division was positioned north of the peninsula under the command of First Army.

=== August 1915 ===
- (Ottoman Empire) Fifth Army (Otto Liman von Sanders)
  - I Corps
    - 2nd Division
    - 3rd Division
  - II Corps
    - 4th Division
    - 5th Division
    - 6th Division
  - III Corps
    - 7th Division
    - 8th Division
    - 9th Division
    - 19th Division
  - IV Corps
    - 10th Division
    - 11th Division
    - 12th Division
  - V Corps
    - 13th Division
    - 14th Division
    - 15th Division
  - Dardanelles Fortified Area Command
  - One aircraft squadron

=== Naval forces ===
- U-21
- Sultanhisar
- Yavûz Sultân Selîm
- Midilli
- Muavenet-i Milliye
- Turgut Reis
- Transport (sunk 27 April 1915)

== See also ==
- List of Allied warships that served at Gallipoli

== Bibliography ==
- Brig C.F. Aspinall-Oglander, History of the Great War: Military Operations Gallipoli, Vol II, May 1915 to the Evacuation, London: Heinemann, 1932/Imperial War Museum & Battery Press, 1992, ISBN 0-89839-175-X/Uckfield: Naval & Military Press, 2011, ISBN 978-1-84574-948-4.
- Austin, Ron (2005). Gallipoli: An Australian Encyclopedia of the 1915 Dardanelles Campaign. McRae, Victoria: Slouch Hat Publications. ISBN 9780957975255.
- Erickson, Edward J. (2001) [2000]. Ordered to Die: A History of the Ottoman Army in the First World War. Westport, CT: Greenwood Publishing. ISBN 0-313-31516-7.
- Gilbert, Greg (2013). "Air War Over the Dardanelles". Wartime (61). Canberra: Australian War Memorial: 42–47. ISSN 1328-2727.
- Lepetit, Vincent; Tournyol du Clos, Alain; Rinieri, Ilario, eds. (1923). Les armées françaises dans la Grande guerre. Tome VIII. La campagne d'Orient (Dardanelles et Salonique) Premier Volume. (février 1915-août 1916) [8,1] (in French). Paris: Imprimerie Nationale. OCLC 491775878.
- Travers, Tim (2001). Gallipoli 1915. Stroud: Tempus. ISBN 075242551X.
