= II ANZAC Corps Mounted Regiment =

Australian and New Zealand mounted unit

II ANZAC Corps Mounted Regiment XXII Corps Mounted Regiment
- Active: 1916–1918
- Country: Australia; New Zealand
- Branch: Australian Army; New Zealand Army
- Role: Mounted infantry
- Size: Regiment
- Part of: II ANZAC Corps (1916–17); XXII Corps (1917–18)
- Engagements: First World War: Western Front

Insignia
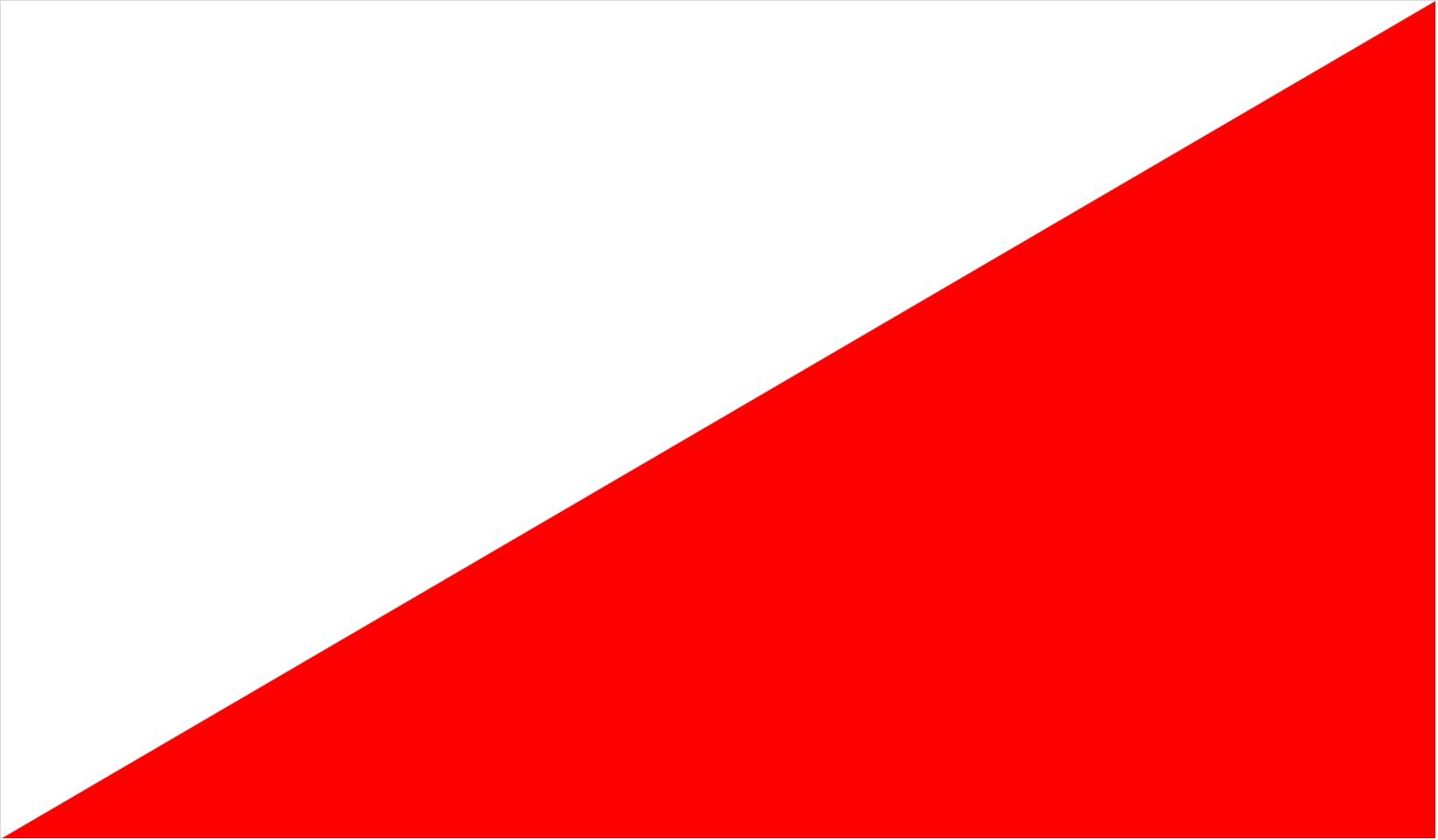
- Unit colour patch

The II ANZAC Corps Mounted Regiment was a combined mounted unit made up of Australian and New Zealand troops during the First World War. The regiment served on the Western Front between 1916 and 1918. For the most part, the regiment undertook rear area duties, although it undertook more mobile operations in early 1917 during the German withdrawal to the Hindenburg Line. In November 1917, the regiment was redesignated as the XXII Corps Mounted Regiment when II ANZAC Corps was converted into XXII Corps. During early 1918, the regiment played a defensive role during the German spring offensive and then supported French operations during the Second Battle of the Marne. The regiment continued operations throughout the remainder of 1918, supporting the Allied Hundred Days Offensive until the end of the war.

== History ==
The regiment was formed in July 1916 when two Australian squadrons from the 4th Light Horse Regiment were joined together with a New Zealand squadron from the Otago Mounted Rifles to form a corps-level mounted regiment for attachment to II ANZAC Corps on the Western Front, known as the II ANZAC Mounted Regiment. The regiment's constituent units had previously served in the Gallipoli campaign and Egypt; while the majority of the Australian and New Zealand mounted troops remained in the Middle East to take part in the Sinai and Palestine campaign, a small number were deployed to the Western Front to support the Australian and New Zealand infantry divisions that were deployed there in mid-1916.

The tactical situation and terrain on the Western Front limited the role of the regiment. In the early part of its involvement on the Western Front it was mainly used in the rear areas, while being held in readiness to respond if there was a breakthrough to exploit, or a rapid penetration of the line by enemy forces to counter. However, it was used in a mobile, mounted role during operations to follow up the German withdrawal to the Hindenburg Line in early 1917 and was heavily involved at the start of the Battle of Messines later in the year; when the ground became muddy and unsuited to mounted operations, the regiment undertook dismounted duties in the trenches in the Ypres sector of the front. In November 1917 the five Australian infantry divisions were combined to form the Australian Corps and II ANZAC Corps and its remaining New Zealand units were reorganised, becoming part of the British XXII Corps. The regiment was accordingly renamed as the XXII Corps Mounted Regiment at this time. However, unlike the other combined units, the Australian personnel serving in the regiment remained with the corps, being the only Australians to do so.

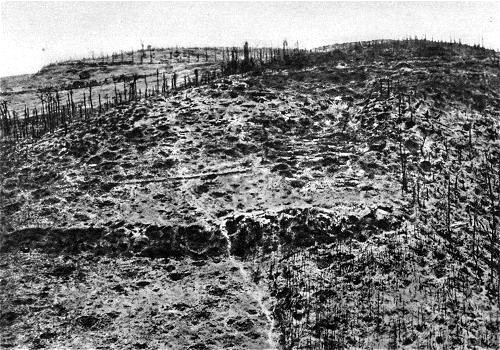
Kemmelberg, the scene of the regiment's heaviest fighting during the war

During April and May 1918, amidst the German spring offensive, the regiment was heavily involved due to the more mobile nature of operations during this phase. Its main engagement during this period came around Mont Kemmel. Once the offensive had been held, the regiment supported French offensive efforts during the Second Battle of the Marne in July. In August, the Allies launched their Hundred Days Offensive, during which the regiment undertook reconnaissance and acted as a screening force as the infantrymen advanced as part of efforts to breach the Hindenburg Line. While most of the Australian Corps was withdrawn for rest and reorganisation in October, the regiment continued fighting until the armistice in November. In this phase of the war, the regiment supported III Corps until September, before returning to the command of XXII Corps, being detached upon request of their corps commander, Lieutenant General Alexander Godley. Its final operations came around Cambrai and Valenciennes.

Following the armistice the XXII Corps Mounted Regiment was disbanded in early December 1918, at which time its Australian personnel were transferred to the 13th Light Horse Regiment. During the war, the regiment lost 45 killed and 126 wounded; the majority of these were incurred during the fighting around Mont Kemmel in April 1918. Members of the regiment received the following decorations: three Military Crosses; one Distinguished Conduct Medal; 12 Military Medals, six Mentions in Despatches, two Meritorious Service Medals, and five foreign awards.

== Battle honours ==
The II ANZAC (XXII Corps) Mounted Regiment received the following battle honours:

- Messines 1917, Ypres 1917, Broodseinde, Passchendaele, Lys, Kemmel, Marne 1918, Tardenois, France and Flanders 1916–18

In 1927, the regiment's battle honours were entrusted to the 4th Light Horse Regiment.

== Commanding officers ==
The following officers commanded the II ANZAC (XXII Corps) Mounted Regiment:

- Lieutenant Colonel Leonard Long (1916–1917); and
- Lieutenant Colonel Stanley George Hindhaugh (1917–1918).
