= Alfred Cavendish =

British Army general

Brigadier-General Alfred Cavendish CMG
- Born: 19 June 1859
- Died: 2 February 1943 (aged 83)
- Military career
- Allegiance: United Kingdom
- Branch: British Army
- Rank: Brigadier-General
- Commands: South African Command; 2nd Battalion Argyll and Sutherland Highlanders
- Conflicts: Second Boer War; First World War
- Awards: Companion of the Order of St Michael and St George; Mentioned in Despatches

Brigadier-General Alfred Edward John Cavendish, CMG (19 June 1859 – 2 February 1943) was a British Army general who served in the Second Boer War and First World War as a staff officer.

== Military career ==
Cavendish was on 14 January 1880 commissioned a second lieutenant in the 91st (Princess Louise's Argyllshire Highlanders) Regiment, later the Argyll and Sutherland Highlanders. He was promoted to lieutenant on 1 July 1881, served as adjutant to the 1st Battalion from 1885 to 1887, during which he was promoted to captain on 12 June 1886, then passed through the Staff College and entered a career of staff posts.

Cavendish climbed Paektu Mountain in 1891, and published an account of his experiences in 1894. During the First Sino-Japanese War he was an attaché with the Chinese Army, and on 12 February 1897 he was promoted to major. After service as the Deputy Assistant Adjutant General (DAAG) for Dublin and Aldershot Districts, he was in January 1900 appointed Deputy Assistant Adjutant General for the 8th Division South African field force, created to take part in the Second Boer War in South Africa. He left Southampton in the SS Moor in March 1900 with the staff of the 8th division and 600 men of militia regiments, arriving in Cape Town the next month. In South Africa, he took part in operations about Dewetsdorp and Thabanchu during the relief of Wepener (April 1900), the occupation at Senechal, and the action at Biddulphsberg (May 1900). He was DAAG for intelligence during the operations in the Wittebergen and Nordebergen, resulting in the surrender of Boer Commandant Prisloo in July 1900. Later that year he took part in the occupation of Harrismith and the action at Doornberg (Sep 1900) where he was wounded, then served for the duration of the war in the Orange River Colony. Following the end of the war with the Peace of Vereeniging on 31 May 1902, he returned home on the SS Dilwara which arrived at Southampton in late October 1902. For his service in the Boer war he was mentioned in despatches, received the Queen's South Africa Medal with two clasps, and was appointed a Companion of the Order of St Michael and St George.

Cavendish saw a brief spell of regimental service from 1907 to 1911, commanding his old battalion, the 2nd Argyll and Sutherland Highlanders, before being posted as Assistant Adjutant General of Southern Command.

On the outbreak of the First World War he was appointed Assistant Adjutant General of the British Expeditionary Force, then promoted to brigadier-general and assigned to the staff of V Corps in early 1915. He later served as Assistant Adjutant General to the Mediterranean Expeditionary Force and the Dardanelles Army, and from 1916 was commanding South African Command.
