= General Cavendish =

General Cavendish may refer to:

- Alfred Cavendish (1859–1943), British Army brigadier general
- Charles Cavendish (general) (1620–1643), English royalist colonel-general
- Charles Cavendish (Nottingham MP) (1591–1653), English royalist lieutenant general
- Charles Cavendish, 3rd Baron Chesham (1850–1907), British Army brigadier general and temporary major general
- Lord Frederick Cavendish (British Army officer) (1729–1803), British Army general
- Henry Cavendish (British Army officer) (1789–1873), British Army general
