= Proposed Australian and New Zealand Army =

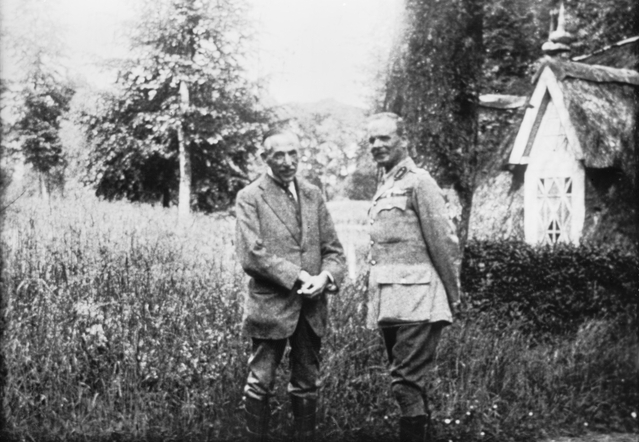
Australian Prime Minister Billy Hughes (at left) with Lieutenant-General William Birdwood in early 1916. The two men were the main proponents of establishing an Australian and New Zealand Army.

In early 1916, the Australian and New Zealand governments proposed the formation of a new field army, to be named the Australian and New Zealand Army, including all of the existing divisions of the Australian Imperial Force (AIF) and New Zealand Expeditionary Force (NZEF). However, the British government objected to the proposal, on the grounds that two corps (I ANZAC Corps and II ANZAC Corps), comprising six divisions, were insufficient for a field army. As a result, the plan was abandoned, and Australian and New Zealand divisions instead served as part of British field armies, for the remainder of World War I. However, in late 1917, the five Australian divisions were grouped together as the Australian Corps.

== History ==
Following the withdrawal of the Australian and New Zealand Army Corps from Gallipoli to Egypt in December 1915, Lieutenant-General William Birdwood, the commander of the AIF, was appointed to the temporary position of commander of the Australian and New Zealand Forces. In his role he was to oversee the reorganisation of the Australian combat divisions and the formation of the New Zealand Division. At this time the Australian and New Zealand Governments hoped to establish an Australian and New Zealand Army comprising two corps under the command of Birdwood. Birdwood was an ambitious officer, and agitated for such a command.

In early 1916 Australian Government telegraphed the British Government supporting Birdwood's proposal to establish an Australian and New Zealand Army. The Australian Government argued that the establishment of this force would reflect Australian aspirations and encourage enlistment in the AIF. It is not clear whether the New Zealand Government supported the proposal at this time. On 2 April 1916 the British War Office responded, declining to establish such a formation but claiming that it would do so "as soon as circumstances permit". The next month the Australian Government offered to establish a sixth division. This offer was made to provide enough divisions to justify the formation of an army. It was also rejected by the British as it was unclear whether Australia would be able to provide sufficient reinforcements to replace the AIF's casualties if the division was formed. During this period Birdwood also encouraged the formation of a Dominion Army which would have included the Canadian forces in France as well as the AIF and NZEF. He hoped to command this army.

Australian Prime Minister Billy Hughes advocated for the establishment of an Australian and New Zealand Army during his visit to General Douglas Haig's General Headquarters in France during late May 1916. Hughes argued that the Australian and New Zealand units in France "should be regarded as an army and that General Birdwood should command it". Haig rejected this proposal, stating that the size of the Australian and New Zealand forces was insufficient to justify forming them into an army. He also made a vague offer to potentially group the Australian divisions under Birdswood's tactical control "for some special operations" in the future. Hughes accepted Haig's position, and decided to not pursue the matter further.

The Australian and New Zealand combat forces in France served as part of two separate corps (I ANZAC Corps and II ANZAC Corps) until late November 1917, when the Australian units were concentrated into the Australian Corps. The New Zealand Division remained part of a British corps.

Writing in 2022, the Australian military historian David Horner judged that "there was an element of aggrandisement and delusion in Australia wanting to form an army of six divisions" in 1916. He observed though that Hughes' advocacy for both the army and Birdwood's command of the AIF was the first attempt by the Australian government to exercise control over how the AIF was employed and led in Europe.
