= John Fowler (British Army officer) =

British Army general (1864–1939)

Lieutenant-General Sir John Fowler KCB KCMG DSO
- Portrait by Walter Stoneman, 1921
- Born: 29 July 1864; Navan, County Meath, Ireland
- Died: 20 September 1939 (aged 75); Harrogate, Yorkshire, England
- Relatives: Sir Alexander Godley (brother-in-law)
- Military career
- Allegiance: United Kingdom
- Branch: British Army
- Service years: 1886–1925
- Rank: Lieutenant-General
- Commands: British Forces in China
- Conflicts: Second Boer War; First World War; Chitral Expedition
- Awards: Knight Commander of the Order of the Bath; Knight Commander of the Order of St Michael and St George; Distinguished Service Order; Mentioned in Despatches

Lieutenant-General Sir John Sharman Fowler, KCB, KCMG, DSO (29 July 1864 – 20 September 1939) was a British Army engineer officer who specialised on telegraph on signals, and who was later Commander of British Forces in China.

== Early life and education ==
Fowler was born in Navan, County Meath, the second son of Robert Fowler and Letitia Coddington. He was educated at Cheltenham College and the Royal Military Academy, Woolwich. His elder sister Louisa married Sir Alexander Godley.

== Military career ==
Fowler was commissioned into the Royal Engineers in January 1886. He took part in the Izazai expedition in 1892, was promoted to captain on 24 September 1895, and went to Chitral in the North West Frontier of India in 1896. He also took part in the Tirah Expeditionary Force in the North West Frontier of India in 1897. He attended the Staff College, Camberley from 1898 to 1899.

Fowler served in the Second Boer War as a member of the South Africa Field Force, and attached to the 2nd Division Telegraph Battalion, and was mentioned in despatches (dated 8 April 1902). Following the end of the war in June 1902, he received a brevet promotion to major in the South African Honours list published on 26 June 1902, and returned home with his division on the SS Britannic from Cape Town to Southampton in October that year.

After his return, he was stationed with the 1st Division Telegraph Battalion, at Aldershot. In March 1905 he succeeded Brevet Lieutenant Colonel Edward Bulfin as a deputy assistant adjutant general.

He was promoted to brevet lieutenant colonel in January 1911.

Fowler also served in the First World War as Director of Army Signals for the British Expeditionary Force (BEF). A temporary colonel in August 1914, he was promoted to temporary brigadier general in October 1914, he was made a brevet colonel in January 1916 a major general in January 1917 and appointed a Companion of the Order of the Bath (CB) in February 1915 and appointed a Knight Commander of the Order of St Michael and St George in January 1918. On 16 May 1918 he was made director of army signals.

In 1921 he was appointed General Officer Commanding the Straits Settlements and the following year he was appointed Commander of British Forces in China. He retired in 1925. He was promoted to Knight Commander of the Order of the Bath (KCB) in the 1926 Birthday Honours.

Fowler was colonel commandant of the Royal Corps of Signals from 1923 to 1934.

== Personal life ==
Fowler married Mary Olivia Henrietta Brooke in Ireland on 10 August 1904. They had two daughters.

Fowler died in Harrogate, Yorkshire, aged 75.

Military offices
Preceded by Sir George Kirkpatrick	Commander of British Forces in China; 1922–1925	Succeeded by Charles Luard
