= Charles Hellier Davies Evans =

Lieutenant Colonel Charles Hellier Davis Evans
- Lieutenant Colonel Charles Evans
- Born: 23 May 1873
- Died: 18 November 1956 (aged 83)
- Military career
- Allegiance: New Zealand
- Branch: New Zealand Army
- Service years: 1900–1919
- Rank: Major
- Unit: New Zealand Expeditionary Force
- Commands: New Zealand Cyclist Corps
- Conflicts: World War I
- Awards: Distinguished Service Order; Mentioned in Despatches; Legion of Honour

Lieutenant Colonel Charles Hellier Davis Evans, DSO (28 May 1873 – 18 November 1956) served as commanding officer of the New Zealand Cyclist Corps. A long time member of New Zealand's volunteer forces he enlisted in the New Zealand Expeditionary Force at the outbreak of World War I, and served with distinction on the Western Front. He was awarded the Distinguished Service Order (second only to the Victoria Cross for officers), Mentioned in Despatches, and was one of only 14 members of the New Zealand Army to receive the French Legion of Honour decoration during the war.

== Early life ==
Charles Evans was born on 23 May 1873 and served as a volunteer from 1900. He was appointed a captain in the Wellington Mounted Rifles in 1911 and working as an accountant prior to World War I.

== World War I ==
The New Zealand Cyclist Battalion, commanded by Lieutenant Colonel Charles Evans, played a significant role in the 1918 Battle of the Marne. Drawn from Mounted Rifles Reinforcements, the New Zealand Cyclist Corps was established under Evans in April 1916, as mobile infantry for patrolling and exploiting breaks in the enemy line. As part of Godley's Corps Troops, the unit was separate from the New Zealand Division but, due to the static nature of warfare on the Western Front, were often used for track-building or cable-laying. Evans was awarded the Distinguished Service Order for his work in preparing a cavalry attack during the Battle of Messines in June 1917. After being rushed into the line to counter the German Spring Offensive in March 1918, Evans' Battalion moved South with XXII Corps and was attached to the French 5th Army for operations on the Marne. On 23 July 1918, Evans led the Cyclists in an attack on the French village of Marfaux which, after losing nearly a third of their unit killed or wounded, they managed to wrest from the Germans. Evans' bravery and leadership were recognized with the award of the Croix de Chevalier of the Légion d’honneur in March 1919. Other unit members were also decorated by the French and the Battalion was honoured by the representation of a Fanion from the Commander of the French 5th Army, General Berthelot in July 1919. Evans took his discharge in November 1919 and subsequently settled in Australia.

== Awards and decorations ==
Evans was awarded the Distinguished Service Order on 17 September 1917 for conspicuous gallantry and devotion to duty when in charge of a party which had to prepare a cavalry track. He reorganised his men when scattered by heavy shell fire, and continued to supervise the work, which by his fine personal example was rapidly completed under heavy fire, and proved subsequently invaluable to the success of our operations during the Battle of Messines in June 1917. He was also mentioned in Despatches on 28 December 1917 in recognition of his excellent service and appointed a Chevalier of the Legion of Honour by the President of France in February 1916. This French award is uncommon for New Zealanders: fewer than 100 awards have been made, and Hastings was one of only 14 members of the New Zealand Expeditionary Force to be decorated with the Legion of Honour during the war.

=== Ribbons ===
- Distinguished Service Order (Great Britain)
- British War Medal 1914–19 (Great Britain)
- Victory Medal with Mention in Despatches (Great Britain)
- King George VI Coronation Medal (Great Britain)
- Colonial Auxiliary Forces Officers' Decoration (Great Britain)
- Colonial Auxiliary Forces Long Service Medal (Great Britain)
- New Zealand Long and Efficient Service Medal (New Zealand)
- New Zealand Volunteer Service Medal (New Zealand)
- Chevalier de la Légion d'Honneur (France)

== See also ==
- Military history of New Zealand in World War I
- List of foreign recipients of the Légion d'Honneur
