= 7th Volunteer Battalion, Royal Scots =

7th Volunteer Battalion, The Royal Scots
- Active: August 1860 - 1908
- Country: United Kingdom
- Branch: Volunteer Force
- Role: Infantry
- Size: Battalion
- Part of: Lothian Brigade
- Garrison/HQ: Haddington

Commanders
- Honorary Colonel: Francis Charteris, 10th Earl of Wemyss

The 7th Volunteer Battalion, Royal Scots was a Volunteer Force battalion of the Royal Scots in the British Army.

== History ==
The 1st Administrative Battalion, Haddington Volunteers was formed as part of the Rifle Volunteer Movement in the 1860s. In 1880 after the Childers Reforms the unit was re-formed as the 1st Haddington Rifle Corps and remained at its headquarters in Haddington. Finally in 1881 as a result of the reforms the unit moved under the control of the Royal Scots and became the 6th Volunteer Battalion. In 1881 a new "E Company" was formed and was headquartered at Prestonpans. In April 1888 the battalion was re-organized and became the 7th Volunteer Battalion. In 1901 the new North Berwick High School Cadet Corps was formed and became affiliated with the battalion. In 1906 the cadet corps was expanded and formed a new "C Company, Haddington Cadet Corps" at Prestonpans. Finally in April 1908 after the Territorial and Reserve Forces Act 1907 the battalion was amalgamated with the 6th Battalion and became the new 8th Battalion.

== Organization ==
The regiment's organization did change during its time from 7 companies at its strength to 6 companies to 1 company. The battalion's structure in 1868, then as the 1st Administrative Battalion, Haddington Volunteers:

- 1st Haddington Rifle Volunteer Corps - Haddington
- 2nd Haddington Rifle Volunteer Corps - Gifford
- 3rd Haddington Rifle Volunteer Corps - Haddington
- 4th Haddington Rifle Volunteer Corps - Aberlady
- 5th Haddington Rifle Volunteer Corps - East Linton
- 6th Haddington Rifle Volunteer Corps - Dunglass
- 7th Haddington Rifle Volunteer Corps - North Berwick

When the unit was re-organized as the 1st Haddington Rifle Corps the battalion had the following structure (1880):

- A Company - Haddington
- B Company - Haddington
- C Company - Aberlady
- D Company - East Linton
- E Company - West Barns
- F Company - North Berwick

== Commanding Officers ==
The regiment had a number of commanding officers including:

- Major later Lieutenant Colonel Sir George Warrender (September 19, 1860 - December 22, 1868)
- Lieutenant Colonel Jas. W. H. Anderson (December 23, 1868 - June 1, 1872)
- Lieutenant Colonel Alexander Scott (June 2, 1872 - June 25, 1879)
- Lieutenant Colonel later Honorary colonel P. Dods (June 26, 1879 - May 31, 1882)
- Lieutenant Colonel W. Guild (June 1, 1882 - September 5, 1894)
- Lieutenant Colonel later Honorary colonel John D. Watson (September 6, 1894 - May 1, 1898)
- Lieutenant Colonel later Honorary colonel Robert Maxwell Main, VD (May 2, 1898 - February 20, 1904)

== Other information ==
When the battalion was part of the Volunteer Force the regiment was 190th in Order of precedence. In 1901 in the South African War the regiment sent 2 companies and gained the battle honour "South Africa, 1901".
