= Alexander Godley =

British Army general (1867–1957)

General Sir Alexander Godley GCB KCMG
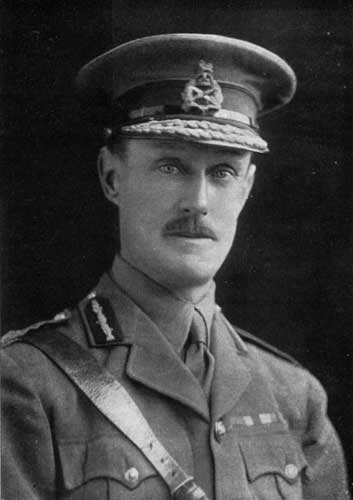
- Godley in 1920
- Born: 4 February 1867; Gillingham, England
- Died: 6 March 1957 (aged 90); Oxford, England
- Relatives: Sir John Fowler (brother-in-law)
- Military career
- Allegiance: United Kingdom
- Branch: British Army
- Service years: 1886–1933
- Rank: General
- Commands: Southern Command (1924–1928); British Army of the Rhine (1922–1924); XXII Corps (1917–1919); II Anzac Corps (1916–1917); I Anzac Corps (1916); New Zealand and Australian Division (1915); New Zealand Expeditionary Force (1914–1919); New Zealand Military Forces (1910–1914)
- Conflicts: Second Boer War; Siege of Mafeking; First World War; Gallipoli campaign; Western Front
- Awards: Knight Grand Cross of the Order of the Bath; Knight Commander of the Order of St Michael and St George; Mentioned in dispatches (10)
- Other work: Governor of Gibraltar (1928–1932)

General Sir Alexander John Godley, GCB, KCMG (4 February 1867 – 6 March 1957) was a senior British Army officer. He is best known for his role as commander of the New Zealand Expeditionary Force and II Anzac Corps during the First World War.

Born in Gillingham, Kent, in England, Godley joined the British Army in 1886. He fought in the Boer War and afterwards served in a number of staff positions in England. In 1910 he went to New Zealand as Commandant of the New Zealand Military Forces. Promoted to temporary major general, he reorganised the country's military establishment. Following the outbreak of the First World War, the New Zealand government appointed him as commander of the New Zealand Expeditionary Force, which he led for the duration of the war.

During the Gallipoli campaign, Godley commanded the composite New Zealand and Australian Division, before taking over command of the Australian and New Zealand Army Corps for the final stages of the campaign. Promoted to lieutenant general, he was given command of II Anzac Corps in 1916. He led the corps for most of its service on the Western Front. Regarded as a cold and aloof commander, his popularity was further dented in October 1917 when he insisted on continuing an offensive in the Ypres salient when weather and ground conditions were not favourable. His corps suffered heavy losses in the ensuing battle. In 1918, II Anzac Corps was renamed XXII Corps and he led it for the remainder of the war.

After the war, Godley spent time in occupied Germany as commander of the IV Corps and then, from 1922 to 1924, the British Army of the Rhine. In 1924 he was promoted to general and was made General Officer, Commanding, Southern Command in England. He was appointed a Knight Grand Cross of the Order of the Bath in 1928 and was Governor of Gibraltar for five years until his retirement in 1933. During the Second World War he commanded a platoon of the Home Guard. He died in 1957 at the age of 90.

== Early life ==
Alexander Godley was born at Gillingham in Kent, England, on 4 February 1867, the eldest son of William Godley, an Irishman who was a captain in the British Army, and Laura née Bird, who was English. His father's brother was John Robert Godley, the founder of Canterbury province in New Zealand. Despite being born in England, Godley always viewed himself an Irishman.

The family moved to Aberdeen in Scotland the year after Godley's birth and then to London in 1873 where he entered the Royal Naval School as he intended to join the Royal Navy. However, after a few years, Godley reconsidered his future and chose to pursue a career with the British Army. To ensure he was adequately educated to qualify as a gentleman cadet for the Royal Military College, Sandhurst, he was enrolled at Haileybury College in 1879. The following year, when he was 13, his father died leaving his mother to raise and educate four children with limited financial resources.

Unable to continue at Haileybury, Godley attended United Services College, in Devon, as a boarder. At one time, his roommate was Rudyard Kipling. After several years, and well prepared, he passed the entrance examinations for Sandhurst and duly entered the college as a gentleman cadet in 1885. Ranked 81st out of 156 cadets when he graduated in August 1886, Godley was commissioned into the Royal Dublin Fusiliers as a lieutenant. His maternal uncle, Spencer Bird, was an officer in the regiment's 1st Battalion, and ensured Godley joined his unit.

Initially stationed at Mullingar in Ireland, Godley's military duties were not onerous and there was plenty of time for sport. An enthusiastic horseman, Godley engaged in hunting and polo, at which he became extremely proficient. He later played in the first international polo match between England and Argentina at the Hurlingham Club in Buenos Aires. Life as an officer in the British Army could be expensive and his living costs exceeded his basic salary. In February 1889, he became the battalion adjutant, and this position saw a useful increase in his salary. From 1890, Godley served in a number of posts around Ireland, including the Royal Dublin Fusiliers recruiting depot at Naas, in County Kildare. Here, to supplement his pay, he trained polo ponies. He also met Louisa Fowler, his future wife, the elder sister of Sir John Sharman Fowler.

In 1894, Godley took an instructors course for mounted infantry at Aldershot. In March 1896, by which time he had reached the rank of captain, he ended nearly ten years of service with the Dublin Fusiliers and returned to Aldershot as adjutant of the Mounted Infantry School there. Later that year he was selected for service in Mashonaland, to help suppress a rebellion in the British South Africa Company's territories in Rhodesia. After serving with the Special Service Battalion of the Mounted Infantry, he returned to England the following year and was promoted brevet major. Again based at Naas, he resumed his acquaintance with Louisa Fowler, and the couple married on 17 September 1898.

== Boer War ==
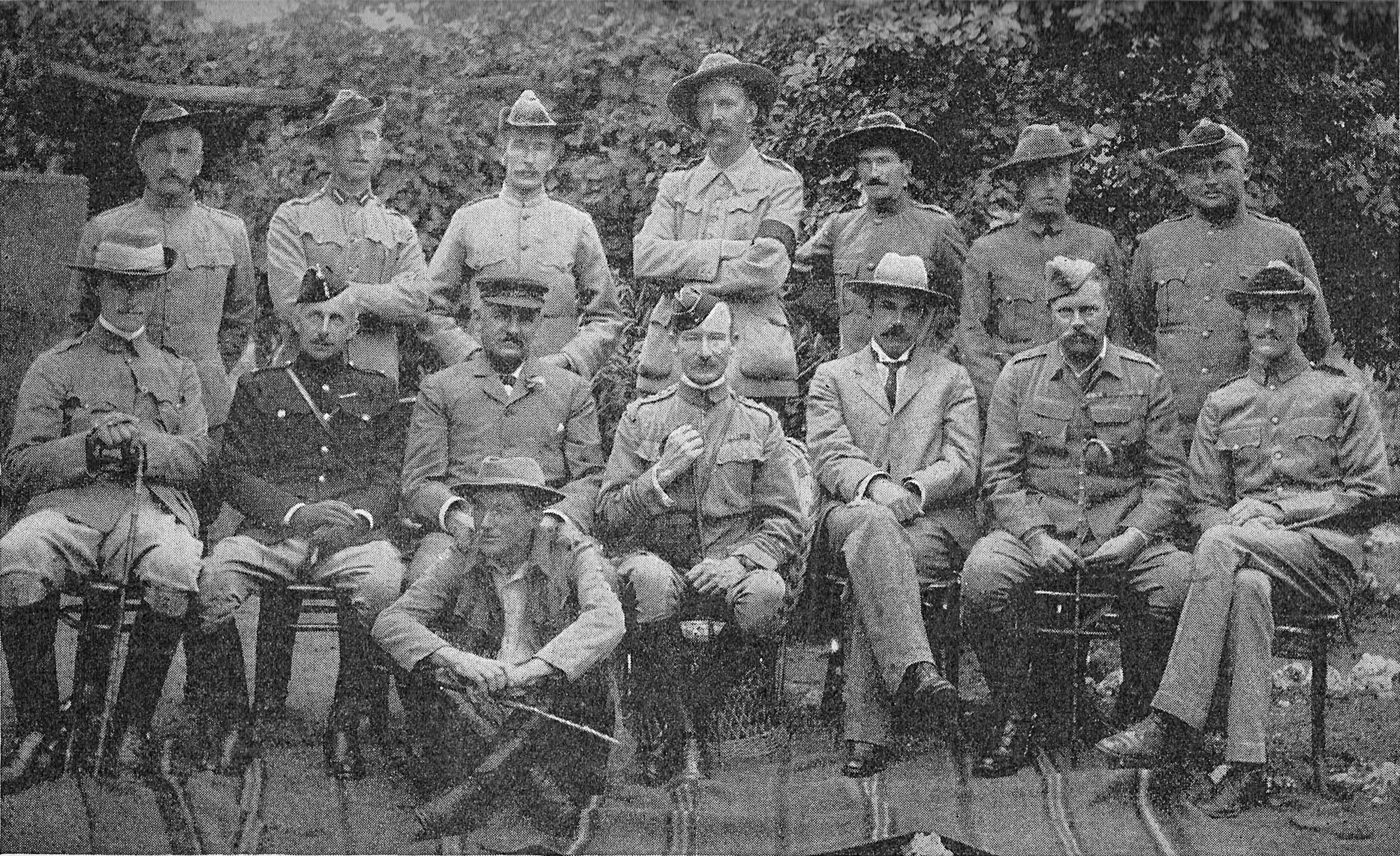
Major-general Robert Baden-Powell and members of his staff after the Siege of Mafeking, 1900. Godley is sat in the middle row, on the extreme left.

In 1898 Godley attended the Staff College at Camberley, which brought him into contact with George Francis Robert Henderson, "the prominent military theorist of his time". However, following the outbreak of the Second Boer War in 1899, ended his studies early to volunteer for service in Africa. Along with other officers of the Special Service Battalion, he helped to raise irregular mounted regiments. Godley was later adjutant to Colonel Robert Baden-Powell and was present during the siege of Mafeking. He was also chief staff officer to Lieutenant Colonel Herbert Plumer and later commanded the Rhodesian Brigade. In 1900, Godley transferred to the Irish Guards before being appointed to the staff at Aldershot Command as commander of the mounted infantry.

Three years later he transferred to Longmoor Military Camp, commanding the mounted infantry there until 1906. By this time, Godley held the brevet rank of colonel, having been promoted in February 1905. He then served as an assistant adjutant general (AAG), taking over this position from Colonel John Cowans, and was promoted to full colonel in March 1906. Godley then served on the staff of the 2nd Division at Aldershot until March 1910 when he relinquished the position to Colonel Beauvoir De Lisle and was placed on half-pay.

== Commandant of the New Zealand Military Forces ==
Later in 1910 Godley accepted the position of commandant of the New Zealand Military Forces, as the New Zealand Army was then known. He had some reservations about his new appointment; he had been in line for command of an infantry brigade and was concerned that being posted to remote New Zealand would be detrimental to his career. He arrived in New Zealand to take up his duties in December 1910. He had been made a Companion of the Order of the Bath in June of that year.

Promoted to temporary major general, Godley, together with fourteen British Army officers seconded to the New Zealand Military Forces, was tasked with reorganising and instilling professionalism in the military establishment of the country. Compulsory military training had recently been introduced by the government but with little thought as to its implementation. In refining the New Zealand Military Forces, Godley drew heavily on the recommendations of Lord Kitchener, who had visited New Zealand earlier in the year on an inspection tour.

Godley established the Territorial Force, which replaced the outdated and recently disbanded Volunteer Force. He organised the structure of the New Zealand Military Forces into four military districts, with each district to be capable of raising an infantry and a mounted brigade. The districts had a specified number of battalions and regiments organised along the lines of the British Army. He also formed the New Zealand Staff Corps, which provided a professional body of officers to train and administer the Territorial Force. The quality of small arms and other personal equipment provided to the country's military personnel were improved and orders placed for new artillery pieces and machine-guns.

By 1914 the Territorial Force had some 30,000 men involved in divisional level training camps; two years previously, the manpower and logistical constraints of the force was such that only battalion level camps could be achieved. When General Ian Hamilton, the Inspector General of Overseas Forces, visited New Zealand in 1914, he was impressed with the level of preparedness of the country's military. This reflected positively on Godley's work, and he was appointed Knight Commander of the Order of St Michael and St George the same year.

From 1912, Godley began putting plans in place for the rapid deployment of a New Zealand Expeditionary Force (NZEF) in the event of war in Europe. He anticipated that Imperial Germany would be the likely enemy and envisaged deployment to either Europe or possibly Egypt, to counter the likely threat to the Suez Canal in the event Turkey aligned itself with Germany. He envisioned the expected deployment would be co-ordinated with an Australian Imperial Force (AIF) and liaised with the Australian Chief of General Staff, Brigadier General Joseph Gordon, and the possibility of a composite division was discussed. The question of Germany's possessions in the South Pacific was also raised, and it was agreed that New Zealand would have responsibility for German Samoa, while Australia dealt with German New Guinea. The arrangements Godley put in place for deployment for the NZEF were soon put to the test, for when the First World War began, a New Zealand occupation force was quickly assembled to occupy German Samoa.

== First World War ==
The New Zealand government authorised the formation of the NZEF for service in the war in support of Great Britain, with Godley, having relinquished his position as commandant of the New Zealand Military Forces to Major General Alfred William Robin, as its commander. Godley would retain command of the NZEF for the duration of the war, making regular reports to James Allen, the New Zealand Minister of Defence. By October 1914, the NZEF consisted of 8,500 men and, along with Godley, just promoted to substantive major general, embarked from Wellington for Europe. The NZEF was intended for service on the Western Front but was diverted to Egypt while in transit, following the entry of Turkey into the war. In Egypt, the NZEF underwent an intensive period of training under Godley's supervision. Despite his strict approach to training and discipline, he was a relatively enlightened commander for his time; he discreetly established drinking canteens and venereal disease treatment centres for his men.

=== Gallipoli ===
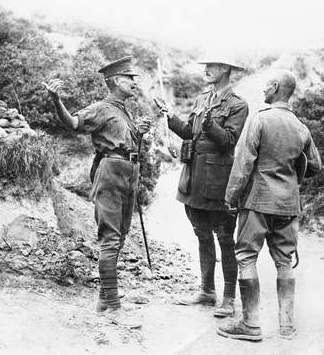
Godley (centre) confers with fellow generals Harry Chauvel (left) and William Birdwood, Gallipoli, 1915

Prior to the start of the Gallipoli campaign, Godley was made commander of the New Zealand and Australian Division, a composite formation of infantry brigades of the NZEF and the AIF. His new command was one of two infantry divisions of the newly formed Australian and New Zealand Army Corps, commanded by General William Birdwood.

Although an extremely competent administrator, there were reservations within the New Zealand government following Godley's appointment as commander of the division. Allen, although publicly supportive of Godley, privately believed an alternative commander should be found after the division completed its training. Godley was a distant and remote divisional commander, not popular with most soldiers of his command. He also favoured the professional officers of the NZEF, most of whom were seconded from the British Army, over those drawn from the Territorial Force.

On the day of the landing at Gallipoli, 25 April 1915, Godley came ashore on Gallipoli at midday. Consulting with Major General William Bridges that afternoon, Godley was of the view that the Allied forces, dealing with stiffer than expected resistance, should be evacuated ahead of an expected attack by Turkish forces the next morning. Although Bridges agreed with Godley, the commander of the Mediterranean Expeditionary Force, Sir Ian Hamilton, ordered them to hold fast.

Godley continued as divisional commander for most of the campaign at Gallipoli. Of tall stature, he made constant tours of the front line amidst jokes that the communication trenches needed to be dug deeply to allow for his height. On one visit to Quinn's Post on 7 May, he personally directed troop deployments to counter a potential Turkish counterattack. Despite his inspections, his reputation among the rank and file of the division did not improve. Nor was his co-ordination of offensive operations sound; during the August offensive, his lack of oversight allowed one of his brigade commanders, Brigadier General Francis Johnston, a British Army officer on secondment to the NZEF, to vacillate over deployment of reinforcements. On the morning of 8 August, the Wellington Infantry Battalion was in tenuous possession of Chunuk Bair but required support to consolidate its position. Johnston did not order his reinforcements forward until later that day. Crucial momentum was lost and Chunuk Bair was later recaptured by the Turks. In September Godley complained to General Maxwell in Egypt that too few of the recovered sick or wounded casualties from Gallipoli were being returned from Egypt, and he replied that "the appetite of the Dardanelles for men has been phenomenal and wicked".

When Birdwood took over command of the newly formed Dardanelles Army, Godley became commander of the Australian and New Zealand Army Corps for the final stages of the Gallipoli campaign and was promoted to temporary lieutenant general on 25 November. With his appointment as corps commander, he also effectively took over responsibility for the administration of the AIF. The same month it was decided to evacuate the Allied forces from Gallipoli. Although much of the detailed planning for the evacuation was left to his chief of staff, Brigadier General Brudenell White, Godley closely inspected the plans before giving his approval. The evacuation was successfully carried out on the nights of 19 and 20 December, with Godley departing on the first night. Following the withdrawal, he was made Knight Commander of the Order of the Bath for his services at Gallipoli, on the recommendation of General Sir Charles Monro, who had replaced Hamilton as commander-in-chief of the Mediterranean Expeditionary Force.

=== Reforming in Egypt ===
The NZEF and the AIF had returned to Egypt following their withdrawal from Gallipoli. The number of reinforcements from both New Zealand and Australia were more than enough to bring the existing ANZAC divisions back up to strength, and in January 1916 Godley proposed forming new divisions from the surplus reinforcements. These were the New Zealand Division and the Australian 4th and 5th Divisions. The new formations, together with the existing divisions, formed the I ANZAC Corps (the renamed Australian and New Zealand Army Corps) and II ANZAC Corps.

Godley was named as commander of I ANZAC Corps which included the original AIF divisions, the 1st and 2nd Divisions, and the newly formed New Zealand Division. These divisions were engaged in defensive duties along the Suez Canal. However, following the German attack at Verdun in February, it was decided that the planned move of I ANZAC Corps to the Western Front be expedited. Birdwood was to take the corps to France, and on 28 March 1916, he exchanged commands with Godley, who took over II ANZAC Corps.

=== Western Front ===
Godley's II ANZAC Corps consisted of the Australian 4th and 5th Divisions along with the ANZAC Mounted Division, and it took over the defensive duties of the I ANZAC Corps. The two Australian divisions were still relatively raw and Godley oversaw the intensive training of both formations. By the end of May 1916, he considered the divisions to be the equal of the 1st and 2nd Australian divisions, which were by that time on the Western Front. The following month, the divisions of II ANZAC Corps began departing for France. Godley went on leave for a short time during this period of transition for his corps. In July, he returned to duty and II ANZAC Corps took over the section of the front line previously occupied by the I ANZAC Corps, near Armentieres. Later that same month, the 5th Division participated in the Battle of Fromelles in support of the neighbouring British XI Corps. It, together with the 4th Australian Division, would later be transferred to the Somme.

Godley continued to lead II ANZAC Corps while the I ANZAC Corps was engaged in the Battle of the Somme. In October, the New Zealand Division, blooded on the Somme, joined II ANZAC Corps along with the 3rd Australian Division, previously based in England. The corps, attached to the Second Army, performed well in its first major engagement, the Battle of Messines. Writing to Allen after the battle, Godley regarded the capture of Messines as "... the greatest success of the war so far, all of it achieved with much lighter casualties than those incurred on the Somme." Despite this success, in August, Godley's poor standing among the NZEF was publicly raised by a member of the New Zealand Parliament who had visited the front earlier in the year.

While serving on the Western Front, Godley continued to fulfil his role as the commander of the NZEF along with his corps command. By September 1917, as reinforcements from New Zealand continued to arrive on the Western Front to replace the casualties lost in the major battles of the previous two years, Allen, still the Minister of Defence, was concerned by the drain on New Zealand's manpower. Allen considered that Australia and Canada were not making their proper contributions to the war effort. Godley pointed out that the Australian divisions had seen more action than the New Zealanders.

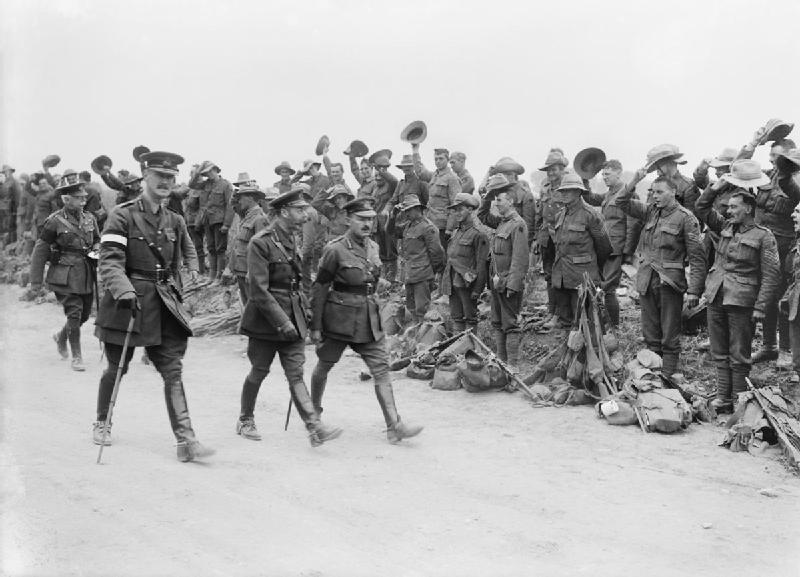
Godley (left front holding cane) with King George V, inspecting the New Zealand Division, August 1916

The II ANZAC Corps played an important role in the Third Battle of Ypres in October 1917. Following the success of his corps at the Battle of Broodseinde on 4 October 1917, Godley believed the morale of the Germans was low and pushed for further attacks to secure the Passchendaele Ridge. This was in concert with the preference of Field Marshal Douglas Haig, the commander of the British Expeditionary Force. Godley's commander, General Herbert Plumer, preferred to halt the offensive as the weather had deteriorated immediately after the battle. In the Battle of Poelcapelle on 9 October by the 49th and 66th Divisions, both British formations attached to II ANZAC Corps, were hampered by the poor weather which showed no signs of abating and achieved very limited gains.

Despite this and at Godley's urging, a further attack was planned for 12 October, this time using the New Zealand Division and the 3rd Australian Division. By now the ground was a sea of mud and a lack of preparation on the part of Godley's corps headquarters hampered the preliminary movements of the attacking divisions and supporting artillery. Godley's plans for the attack were overly ambitious and beyond the scale of previous operations that had been mounted earlier in the month in better weather and ground conditions and with more time to prepare.

The First Battle of Passchendaele on 12 October proved to be a failure with limited gains and heavy losses in the attacking divisions. Russell, commander of the New Zealand Division, considered the planning and preparation by Godley and his staff at II ANZAC Corps for the battle to be inadequate. After the battle, Godley downplayed the losses in the New Zealand Division (which amounted to around 2,900 casualties) and overstated the gains made in official correspondence to Allen and a friend, Clive Wigram, who was the assistant private secretary to King George V.

Notwithstanding Godley's efforts to placate him, Allen again raised his concerns over the extent of New Zealand's contributions to the war relative to Australia's and sought further explanation for the New Zealand losses of 12 October. Allen was also beginning to query the quality of British generalship. Godley raised the prospect of being replaced as commander of the NZEF and proposed Major General Andrew Russell, the commander of the New Zealand Division, as his successor. Godley remained the commander of the NZEF until its disbandment in late 1919.

In January 1918, II ANZAC Corps had its Australian contingent transferred and it was renamed XXII Corps. Two months later, the New Zealand Division was transferred to VII Corps. Godley's corps was now composed largely of British divisions with a small contingent of New Zealand corps units. After being involved in the defence of the Allied positions during the German spring offensive of late March, it then participated, under French command, in the Second Battle of the Marne in July. Godley was temporary commander of III Corps in the Battle of Mont Saint-Quentin during the early phase of the Hundred Days Offensive in August 1918 before returning to command of XXII Corps.

By the close of the war, Godley, who in June 1918 had had his rank of lieutenant general made substantive, had been mentioned in dispatches ten times. He also received a number of foreign decorations as a result of his war service. After an award of the French Croix de Guerre, he was appointed in 1918 to the French Legion of Honour as a Grand Officier, having previously been made a Croix de Commandeur in 1917. He was also awarded the Serbian Great Officer Cross of the Order of the White Eagle (with Swords) in October 1916, the Belgian Order of the Crown in 1917 and the Belgian Croix de guerre in 1918.

== Postwar career ==
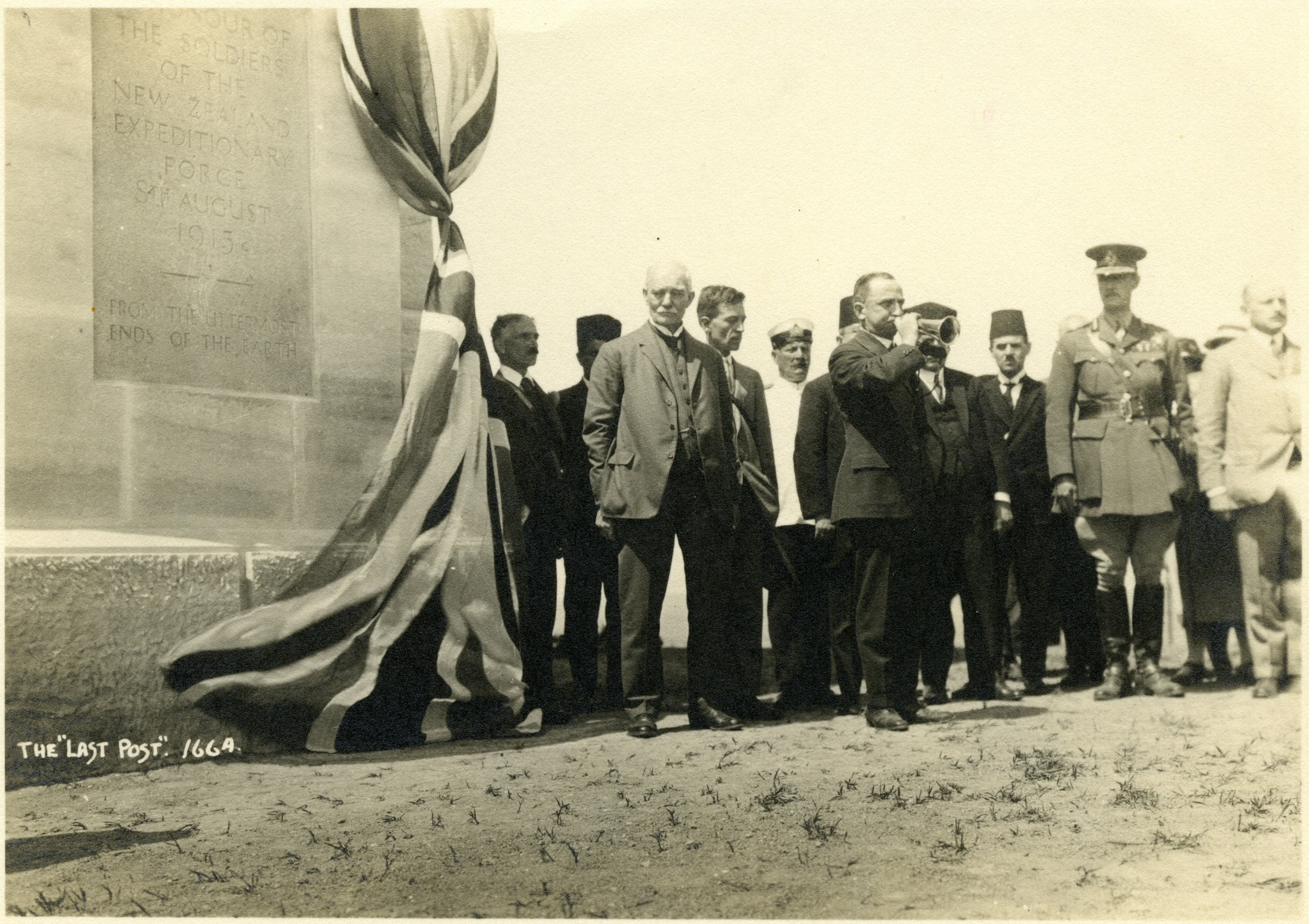
Godley at the unveiling on 12 May 1925 of the Chunuk Bair Memorial

After the war, Godley became commander of IV Corps which was based in Germany as an occupation army, but he remained responsible for administration of the NZEF until it was disestablished in November 1919. From 1920 to 1922, he was military secretary to the secretary of state for war. He then returned to Germany as commander-in-chief of the British Army of the Rhine. Promoted to general in 1923, the following year he was appointed commander of England's Southern Command. In May 1925 he became aide-de-camp general to George V.

In August 1928, Godley was appointed to the governorship of Gibraltar, a position in which he remained until his retirement in 1933. Godley was considered the ablest of the immediate post war governors although he made a misjudgement in interfering in the politics of the Royal Calpe Hunt. The King had to intercede after Godley removed the master of the hunt creating large divisions that were not repaired until his successor took charge.

He always held his New Zealand soldiers in high esteem, even if that respect was not reciprocated, and made tours of New Zealand in 1934 and 1935. When made a Knight Grand Cross of the Order of the Bath in January 1928, he included in his coat of arms an image of a New Zealand infantryman. In late 1936, Godley was considered a possible candidate for the governorship of New South Wales but was ultimately not appointed to the position. In his retirement Godley wrote a number of professional articles and his memoirs, Life of an Irish Soldier, were published in 1939. He later wrote and published British Military History in South America.

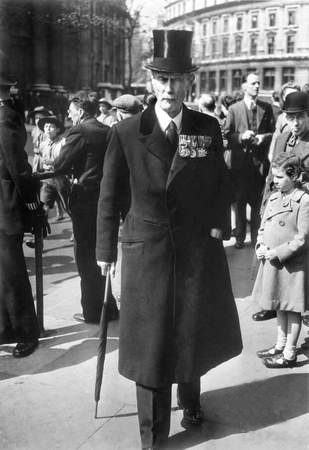
Godley attending an ANZAC Day service, London, 25 April 1948

In late June 1939, Godley's wife Louisa died in England of a cerebral thrombosis. The couple were childless. She had lived in New Zealand during Godley's term as commandant of the New Zealand Military Forces, and had also accompanied him to Egypt during the war. While in Egypt, she had been mentioned in despatches for her work in setting up and running a hospital in Alexandria for New Zealand soldiers. A wreath was sent for the funeral by the New Zealand government on behalf of its citizens.

Following the outbreak of the Second World War, Godley, now aged 72, offered his services to the New Zealand government, but got no response. He later commanded a platoon of the Home Guard. He also assisted the publisher in a revision of The Home Guard Training Manual and worked at the Royal Empire Society in London. He retired to Woodlands St Mary in Lambourn and then Boxford, both in Berkshire.

== Death ==
Godley died at the age of 90 in a rest home at Oxford on 6 March 1957. After a funeral service at St Mary's Church, Lambourn Woodlands, Berkshire, was held on 14 March 1957, his remains were cremated and interred in his wife's grave. A memorial service was held at the Royal Military Chapel at the Wellington Barracks in London on 21 March 1957. The service was attended by a representative of Queen Elizabeth II.

== Publications ==
- Godley, Alexander John, Sir (1939). Life of an Irish Soldier: Reminiscences of General Sir Alexander Godley. New York: E.P. Dutton and Company. OCLC 398289.
- Godley, Alexander, Sir (1943). British Military History in South America. London: Feilden Publications. OCLC 18542093.

== Notes ==
Military offices
Preceded by New command	Commandant of the New Zealand Military Forces; 1910–1914	Succeeded by Sir Alfred Robin
Preceded by New command (part of Anzac Corps)	Commander, I Anzac Corps; February–March 1916	Succeeded by William Birdwood
Preceded by William Birdwood	Commander, II Anzac Corps; 1916–1917	Succeeded by Post disbanded
Preceded by Sir Thomas Morland	Commander-in-Chief of the British Army of the Rhine; 1922–1924	Succeeded by Sir John Du Cane
Preceded by Sir Walter Congreve	GOC-in-C Southern Command; 1924–1928	Succeeded by Sir Archibald Montgomery-Massingberd
Government offices
Preceded by Sir Charles Monro	Governor of Gibraltar; 1928–1932	Succeeded by Sir Charles Harington
