= Mediterranean Expeditionary Force =

WW1 British Army command

- Active: 1915–1916
- Country: British Empire
- Engagements: First World War: Gallipoli campaign; Macedonian front

Commanders
- Notable commanders: Sir Ian Hamilton (1915); William Birdwood (1915); Sir Charles Monro (1915–1916)

The Mediterranean Expeditionary Force (MEF) was the part of the British Army during World War I that commanded all Allied forces at Gallipoli and Salonika. It was formed in March 1915, under the command of General Sir Ian Hamilton, at the beginning of the Gallipoli campaign of the First World War.

== History ==
The Mediterranean Expeditionary Force included the initial naval operation to force the straits of the Dardanelles. Its headquarters was formed in March 1915. The MEF was originally commanded by General Sir Ian Hamilton until he was dismissed due to the failure of the 29th Division at Gallipoli. Command briefly passed to Lieutenant General Sir William Birdwood, commander of the Australian and New Zealand Army Corps, but for the duration of the Gallipoli campaign it was General Sir Charles Monro, who had served on the Western Front as a division, corps, and army commander, who led the MEF.

While the Gallipoli theatre was the only active Mediterranean theatre, the MEF was used to refer to the forces at Gallipoli. With the opening of the Salonika front in October 1915, the forces at Gallipoli were referred to as the Dardanelles Army and the Salonika contingent became the Salonika Army on the Macedonian front. Once Salonika became the sole Mediterranean theatre the MEF was commanded by General Sir Archibald Murray who was based in Egypt and whose command also involved defence of the Suez Canal from Turkish attacks. As the importance of the Sinai front grew, a separate headquarters called the Egyptian Expeditionary Force was formed (in March 1916).

Supposedly when Secretary of State for War Lord Kitchener, was preparing the Mediterranean expedition he intended to name the headquarters the Constantinople Expeditionary Force but Hamilton suggested this might be a bit of a giveaway and also noted in his diary, "I begged him to alter this to avert Fate's evil eye."

== See also ==
- Order of battle for the Gallipoli Campaign
- Gallipoli campaign
- Dardanelles Army
