= Australian and New Zealand Army Corps =

First World War military force

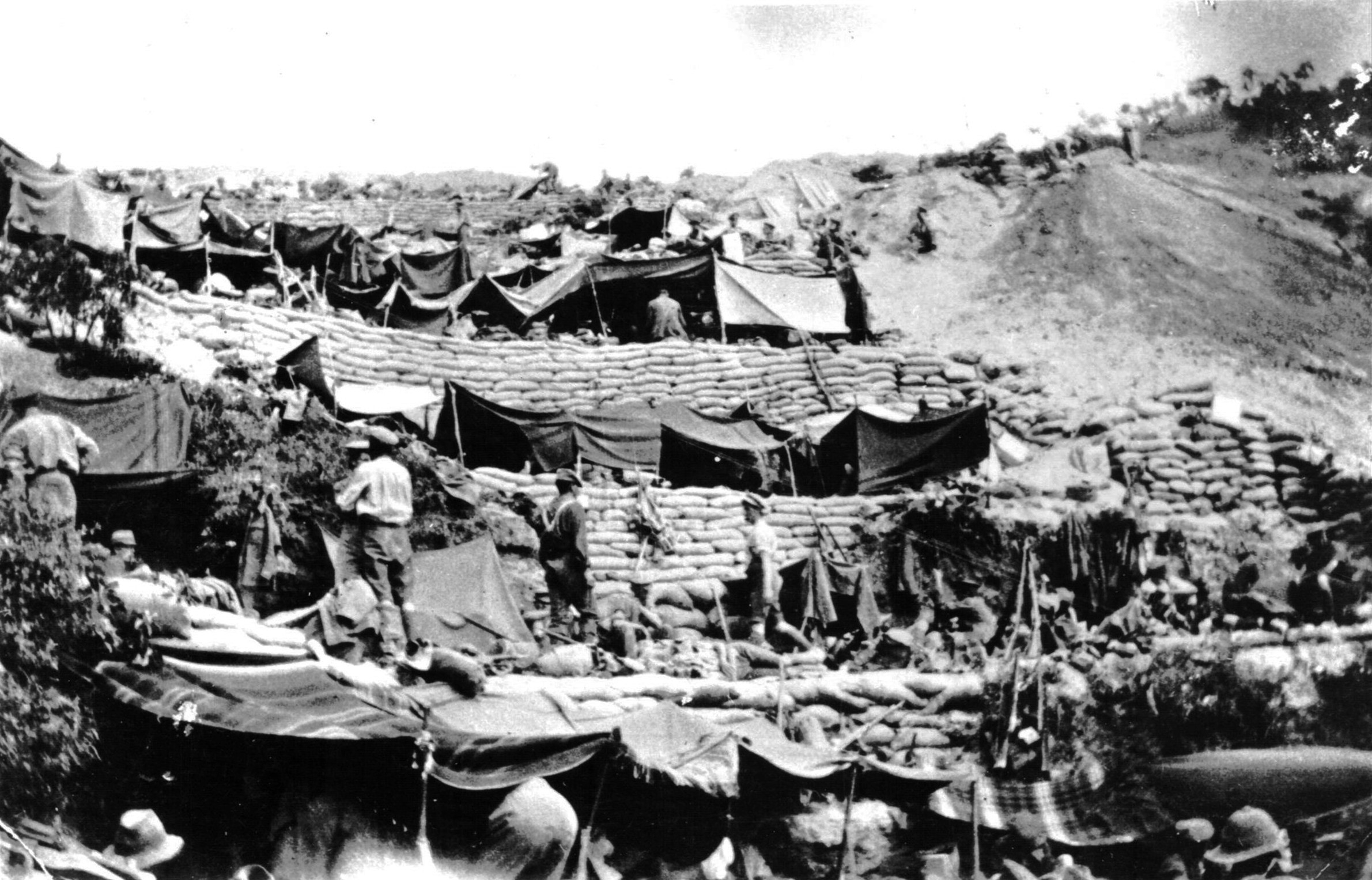
- New Zealand soldiers' encampment at ANZAC Cove in 1915
- Active: 1914–1916; 1941
- Countries: Australia; New Zealand
- Allegiance: British Empire
- Branch: Army
- Type: Army Corps
- Part of: Mediterranean Expeditionary Force
- Nickname: ANZAC
- Anniversaries: Anzac Day
- Engagements: First World War; Second World War; Vietnam War

Commanders
- Notable commanders: William Birdwood

The Australian and New Zealand Army Corps (ANZAC) was originally a First World War army corps of the British Empire under the command of the Mediterranean Expeditionary Force. It was formed in Egypt in December 1914, and operated during the Gallipoli campaign. General William Birdwood commanded the corps, which primarily consisted of troops from the First Australian Imperial Force and 1st New Zealand Expeditionary Force, although there were also British and Indian units attached at times throughout the campaign. The corps disbanded in 1916, following the Allied evacuation of the Gallipoli peninsula and the formation of I ANZAC Corps and II ANZAC Corps. The corps was re-established, briefly, in the Second World War during the Battle of Greece in 1941.

The term 'ANZAC' has been used since for joint Australian–New Zealand units of different sizes.

== History ==
=== Original formation and the Gallipoli disaster ===
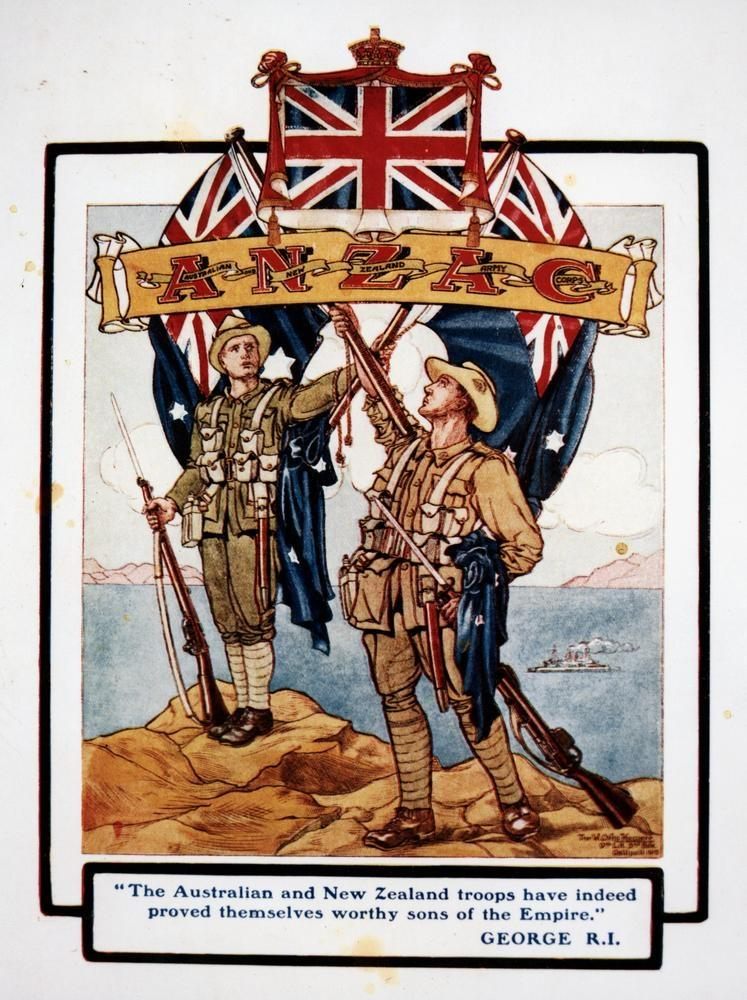
Popular illustration of Anzac troops after the fighting at Gallipoli

Plans for the formation began in November 1914 while the first contingent of Australian and New Zealand troops were still in convoy bound for, as they thought, Europe. However, following the experiences of the Canadian Expeditionary Force encamped on Salisbury Plain, where there was a shortage of accommodation and equipment, it was decided not to subject the Australians and New Zealanders to the English winter, and so they were diverted to Egypt for training before moving on to the Western Front in France. The British Secretary of State for War, Horatio Kitchener, appointed Lieutenant General William Birdwood, an officer of the British Indian Army, to the command of the corps and he furnished most of the corps staff from the Indian Army as well. Birdwood arrived in Cairo on 21 December 1914 to assume command of the corps.

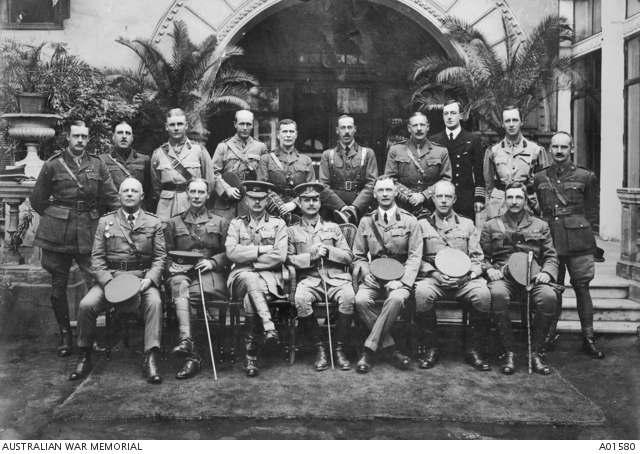
Group portrait of officers of the Australian and New Zealand Army Corps outside Shepheard's Hotel, Cairo, Egypt, March 1915.

It was originally intended to name the corps the Australasian Army Corps, this title being used in the unit diary in line with the common practice of the time which often saw New Zealanders and Australians compete together as Australasia in sporting events. However, complaints from New Zealand recruits led to adoption of the name Australian and New Zealand Army Corps. The administration clerks found the title too cumbersome so quickly adopted the abbreviation A. & N.Z.A.C. or simply ANZAC. Shortly afterwards it was officially adopted as the codename for the corps, but it did not enter common usage amongst the troops until after the Gallipoli landings.

At the outset, the corps comprised two divisions; the Australian Division, composed of the 1st, 2nd and 3rd Australian Infantry Brigades and the New Zealand and Australian Division, composed of the New Zealand Infantry Brigade, New Zealand Mounted Rifles Brigade, Australian 1st Light Horse Brigade and 4th Australian Infantry Brigade. The 2nd and 3rd Australian Light Horse Brigades were assigned as corps level troops, belonging to neither division.

Despite being synonymous with Australia and New Zealand, ANZAC was a multi-national body: in addition to the many British officers in the corps and division staffs, the Australian and New Zealand Army Corps contained, at various points, the 7th Brigade of the Indian Mountain Artillery, Ceylon Planters Rifle Corps troops, the Zion Mule Corps, several battalions from the Royal Naval Division, the British 13th (Western) Division, one brigade of the British 10th (Irish) Division and the 29th Indian Brigade.

=== Later formations ===
==== World War I ====
Following the evacuation of the Gallipoli peninsula, in December 1915, the Australian and New Zealand units reassembled in Egypt. The New Zealand contingent expanded to form their own division; the New Zealand Division. The First Australian Imperial Force underwent a major reorganisation resulting in the formation of two new divisions; the 4th and 5th divisions. (The Australian 3rd Division was forming in Australia and would be sent directly to England and then to France.) These divisions were reformed into two corps: I ANZAC Corps and II ANZAC Corps. I ANZAC Corps, under the command of General Birdwood, departed for France in early 1916. II ANZAC Corps, commanded by Lieutenant General Alexander Godley, followed soon after.

In January 1916, the 4th (ANZAC) Battalion, Imperial Camel Corps, was formed with Australian and New Zealand troops. The 1st and 3rd Battalions were Australian, while the 2nd Battalion was British. Then in March 1916, the ANZAC Mounted Division with three Australian and one New Zealand brigade, was formed for service in Egypt and Palestine. The division's name was abbreviated to the A. & N. Z. Mounted Division, to the ANZAC Mounted Division, and to the Anzac Mounted Division by the Australian, and the New Zealand official history. Also serving alongside the ANZAC Mounted Division in the Egyptian Expeditionary Force was the ANZAC Provost Police Corps, the 1st (ANZAC), 3rd (ANZAC), and 4th (ANZAC) Battalions, Imperial Camel Corps Brigade. (Note: The 1st and 3rd Battalions later became known as the 1st and 3rd (Australian) Battalion, Imperial Camel Corps.) There was also the 1st (ANZAC) Wireless Signal Squadron, which served with the British expeditionary force in Mesopotamia in 1916–1917. The acronym was not inclusive. One formation that had troops assigned from both Australia and New Zealand, during the war, and did not use it was the 5th Light Horse Brigade.

In early 1916, the Australian and, to a lesser extent, New Zealand governments sought the creation of an Australian and New Zealand Army, which would have included the New Zealand Division and all of the Australian infantry divisions, but this did not occur.

==== World War II ====
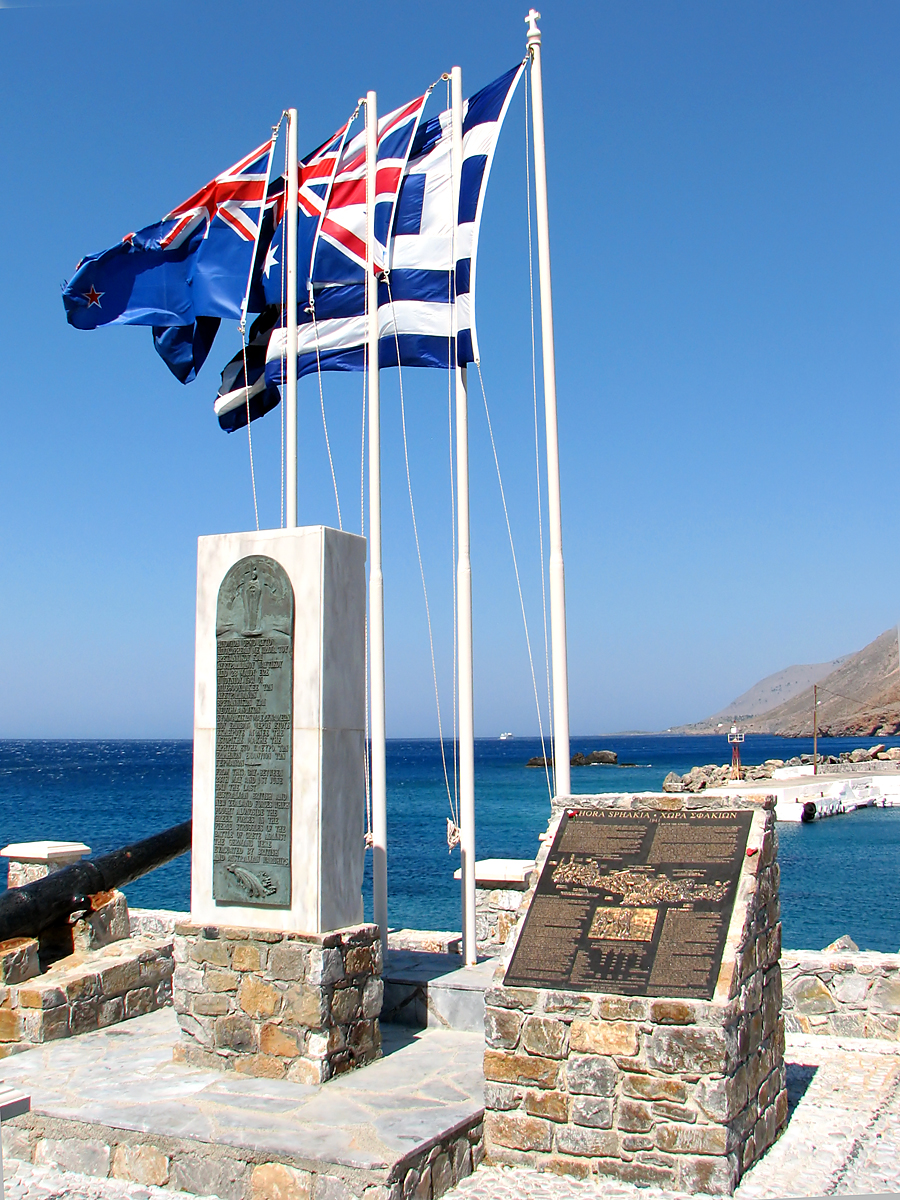
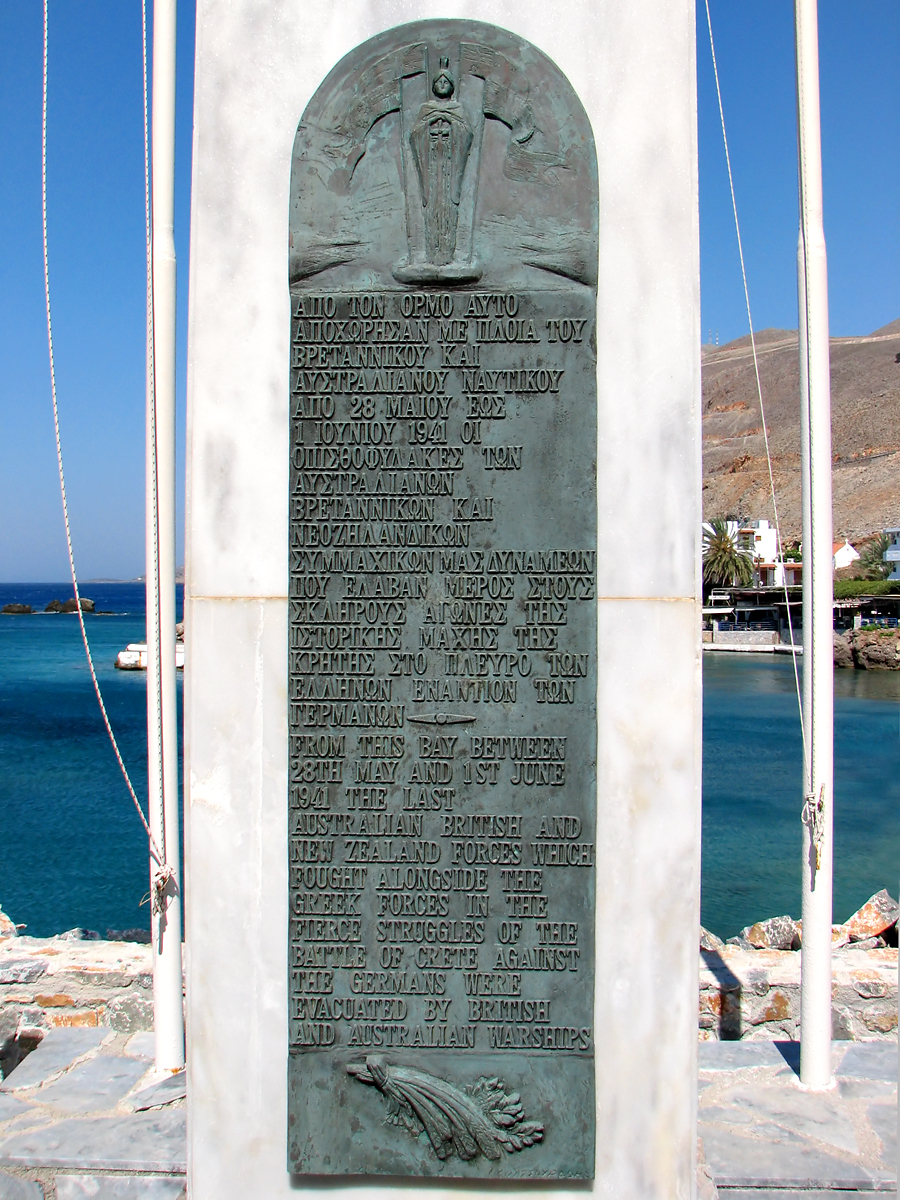
Monument in Sfakia commemorating the evacuation of British and ANZAC forces from Crete in late May 1941.

During World War II, the Australian I Corps HQ moved to Greece in March 1941 (Operation Lustre). As the corps also controlled the New Zealand 2nd Division (along with Greek and British formations), it was officially renamed ANZAC Corps on 12 April, under Lieutenant General Blamey. The Battle of Greece was over in weeks and the corps HQ evacuated mainland Greece on 23–24 April, with the name ANZAC Corps no longer being used.

Some troops evacuated to Alexandria, but the majority were sent to the Greek island of Crete to reinforce its garrison against an expected German invasion from air and sea. Australians and New Zealanders were respectively deployed around the cities of Rethymno and Chania in western Crete with a smaller Australian force being positioned in Heraklion. The invasion began the morning of 20 May and, after the fierce Battle of Crete, which lasted ten days, Crete fell to the Germans. Most of the defenders of Chania withdrew across the island to the south coast and were evacuated by the Royal Navy from Sfakia. Many others evaded capture for several months, hiding in the mountains with generous assistance from the local Cretan population. Others who were captured and transported to Axis POW camps in mainland Europe were able to escape en route via Yugoslavia. Those who escaped found refuge with Chetniks and Yugoslav Partisans until they were either repatriated or recaptured by Axis forces.

==== Other conflicts ====
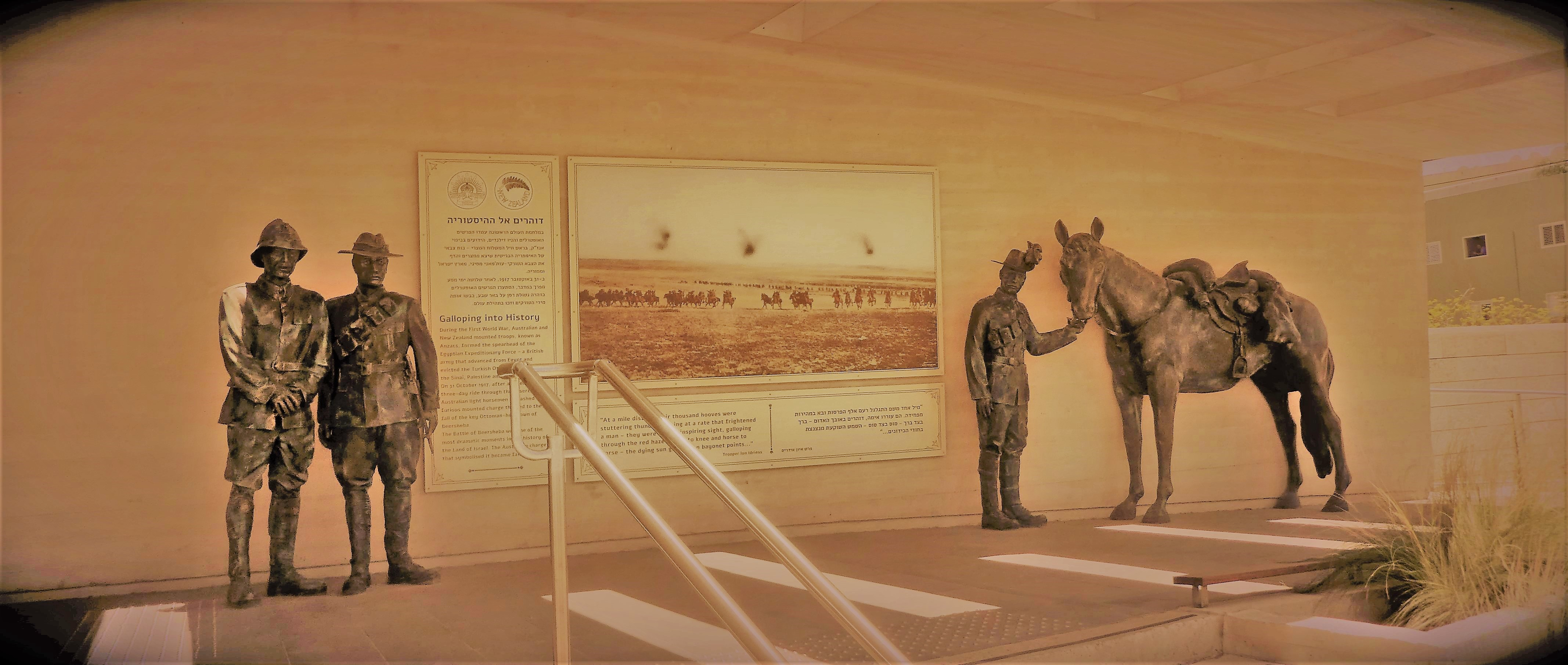
The Be'er Sheva Anzac Memorial Centre, Israel

During the Vietnam War, two companies from the Royal New Zealand Infantry Regiment were integrated into Royal Australian Regiment battalions. These integrated battalions had the suffix (ANZAC) added to their name (for example, 4 RAR became the 4RAR/NZ (ANZAC) Battalion). An ANZAC battalion served as one of the infantry battalions of the 1st Australian Task Force (1 ATF) from early March 1968 until its withdrawal in December 1971. Due to the rotation of forces, there were a total of five combined battalions of this period.

The ANZAC Battle Group was the official designation of Australian and New Zealand units deployed to Timor Leste as part of Operation Astute. The battle group was established in September 2006.

== ANZAC as an acronym ==
As well as referring to specific units, the term ANZAC also came to refer to soldiers themselves: originally those who participated in the Gallipoli landings, then all Australians and New Zealand soldiers in WWI and now more broadly to all Australian and New Zealander defence personnel. This use is reflected in ANZAC Day, which commemorates both the Gallipoli landings specifically and all Australian and New Zealand soldiers that have served or died in wars more broadly.

During WWI, the term also referred to the location of the Gallipoli landings, in what is now known as Anzac Cove (also called simply Anzac at the time). Another use of the term is for Anzac biscuits, a kind of biscuit that is derived from those sent to soldiers during WWI.

=== Legal protection ===
The term ANZAC is protected through domestic legislation in Australia, New Zealand and the United Kingdom and internationally in all of the 180 countries that are members of the Paris Convention for the Protection of Industrial Property. In Australia, the term cannot be protected as a trademark or design, nor used in trade, business or entertainment or as the name of any boat, residence or vehicle. However, the term may be used with prior approval from the minister for veterans' affairs when selling Anzac biscuits, where the recipe does not significantly deviate from the traditional recipe and the food is referred to only as Anzac Biscuits or Anzac Slice, not Anzac Cookies. Similar protections exist in New Zealand, under the responsibility of the minister for culture and heritage.

In response to lobbying by the Australian and New Zealand governments, in 1916 the United Kingdom introduced legislation prohibiting the use of the term in trade or business without the approval of the government of Australia or New Zealand. This resulted in the cancellation of around 29 already registered trademarks including "Anzac Motor Company" and "Anzac Soap". Before the act came into effect, a housing development received much criticism after selecting the name New Anzac-on-Sea as a result of a naming competition. The area was ultimately renamed to the current name of Peacehaven for reasons unrelated to the use of Anzac, as the naming competition fraudulently gave runners-up (practically every person who entered into the competition) the opportunity to buy land in the development that was too small for habitation.

Australia and New Zealand governments were unsuccessful post WWI in persuading other governments to introduce similar restrictions. However, in 2003 the countries successfully applied to register Anzac as an "official sign, hallmark or emblem" under the Paris Convention for the Protection of Industrial Property, requiring signatory countries to refuse the registration of Anzac under their domestic trademark law.

== See also ==
- Anzac Day
- Colour of War: The Anzacs, includes rare colour footage
- Military history of Australia during World War I
- Military history of New Zealand during World War I

== Bibliography ==
- Bean, Charles (1941a) [1921]. The Story of ANZAC from the Outbreak of War to the End of the First Phase of the Gallipoli Campaign, May 4, 1915. Official History of Australia in the War of 1914–1918. Vol. I (11th ed.). Sydney: Angus and Robertson. OCLC 220878987.
- Bean, Charles (1941b) [1926]. The Story of ANZAC from 4 May 1915, to the Evacuation of the Gallipoli Peninsula. Official History of Australia in the War of 1914–1918. Vol. II (11th ed.). Canberra, Australian Capital Territory: Australian War Memorial. OCLC 220051990.
- Bean, Charles (1941c) [1929]. The Australian Imperial Force in France, 1916. Official History of Australia in the War of 1914–1918. Vol. III (12th ed.). Canberra, Australian Capital Territory: Australian War Memorial. OCLC 220623454.
- Broadbent, Harvey (2005). Gallipoli: The Fatal Shore. Camberwell, Victoria: Viking/Penguin. ISBN 978-0-670-04085-8.
- Grey, Jeffrey (2008). A Military History of Australia (3rd ed.). Melbourne, Victoria: Cambridge University Press. ISBN 978-0-521-69791-0.
- McGibbon, Ian (2010). New Zealand's Vietnam War: A History of Combat, Commitment and Controversy. Auckland: Exisle. ISBN 978-0908988969.
- Waite, Fred (1919). The New Zealanders at Gallipoli. Official History of New Zealand's Effort in the Great War. Auckland, New Zealand: Whitcombe & Tombs. OCLC 221448346.
