= XXII Corps (United Kingdom) =

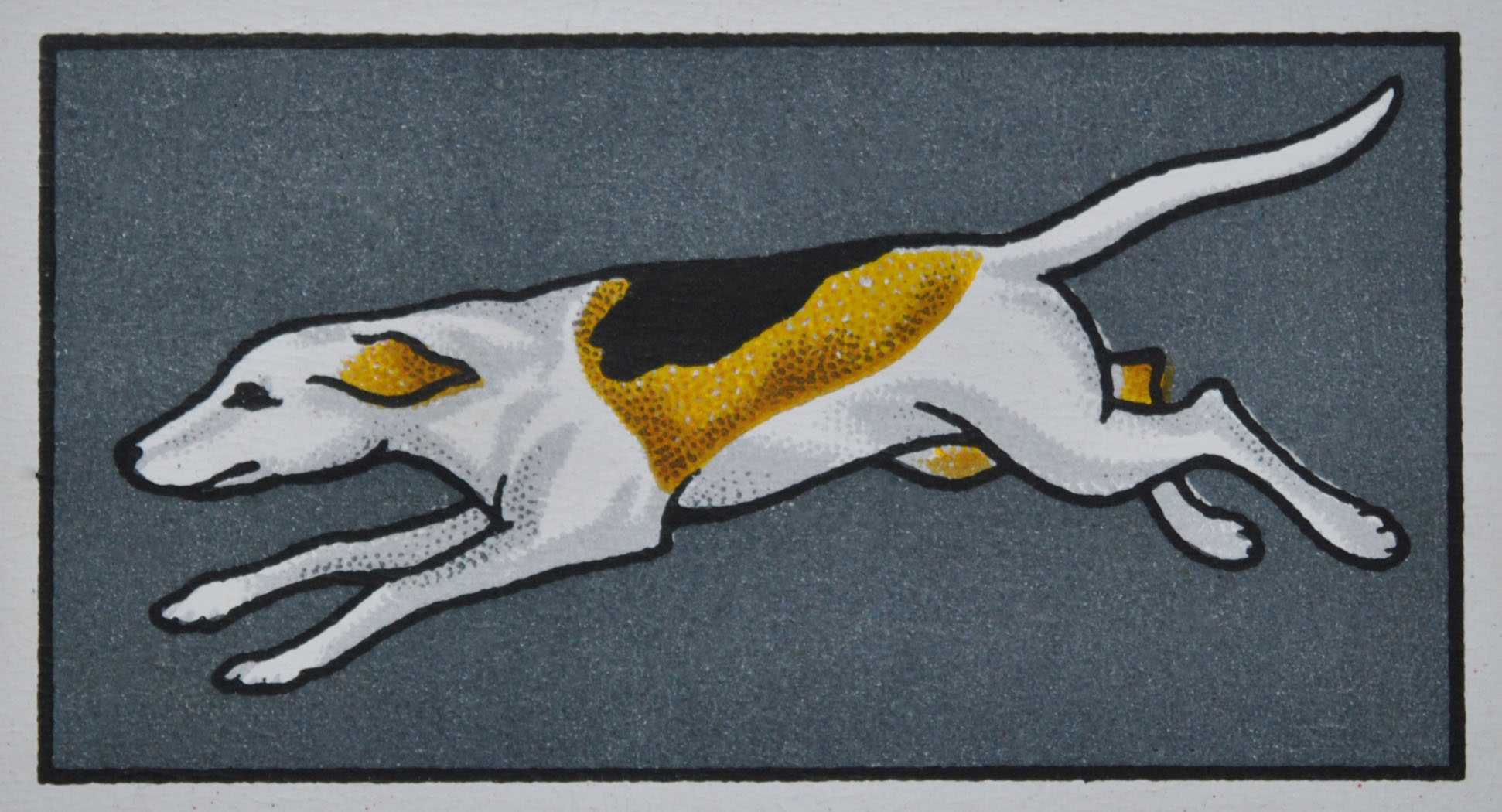
- XXII Corps formation badge.
- Active: World War I
- Country: United Kingdom
- Branch: British Army
- Type: Field corps
- Part of: First Army
- Engagements: World War I: Battle of the Lys; Second Battle of the Lys; Second Battle of Arras; Battles of the Hindenburg Line; Final Advance in Picardy

The British XXII Corps was a British infantry corps during World War I.

== History ==
British XXII Corps was formed in France in December 1917, from what was left of II ANZAC, once the Australian divisions had left to form the Australian Corps. In July 1918, significantly reconstituted as an inter-Allied reserve corps, by the addition of four first-line British Army divisions, the 15th (Scottish) Division, the 34th Division, the 51st (Highland) Division and the 62nd (West Riding) Division. It was placed under French command in July 1918 prior to the German "Friedensturm" (Peace Offensive). The Corps played an important role in the "pinching-off" of the Soissons–Rheims salient (which had been established by the German "Bluecher" Offensive in late May 1918) in the Second Battle of the Marne. Two divisions (15th, 34th) went into action with the French Tenth Army (Mangin) against the Soissons "hinge", two (51st, 62nd) in the Ardre valley with the French Fifth Army (Berthelot) against the Rheims "hinge".

XXII Corps was returned to Haig’s command in early August 1918 to help him bring forward the start date for the Amiens offensive.

== General Officers Commanding ==
Commanders included:

- [28 March 1916] – 27 August 1918 Lieutenant-General Sir Alexander Godley
- 27 August – 12 September 1918 Lieutenant-General Sir Walter Braithwaite (temporary)
- 12 September 1918 – March 1919 Lieutenant-General Sir Alexander Godley

== Books ==
- Greenhalgh, Elizabeth (2014). The French Army and the First World War. Cambridge University Press. ISBN 978-1-107-60568-8.
