= II ANZAC Corps =

Australian and New Zealand army corps formed in 1916

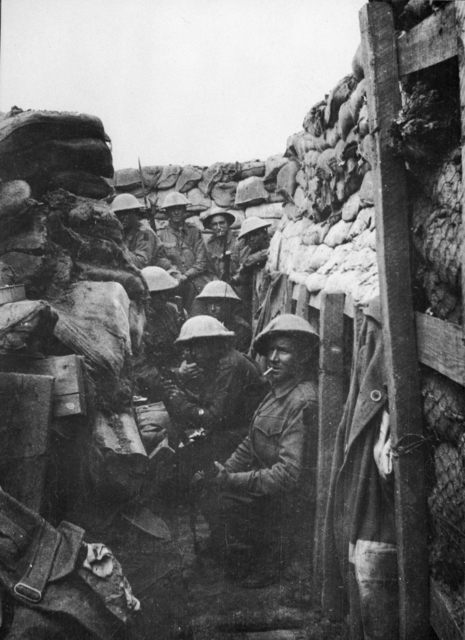
- Members of II Anzac Corps during the Battle of Fromelles, 1916
- Active: 1916–1917
- Country: Australia; New Zealand
- Allegiance: British Empire
- Type: Corps
- Size: 3 infantry divisions and support elements
- Engagements: World War I: Western Front

Commanders
- Notable commanders: Alexander Godley

The II ANZAC Corps (Second Anzac Corps) was an Australian and New Zealand First World War army corps. Formed in early 1916 in Egypt in the wake of the failed Gallipoli campaign, it initially consisted of two Australian divisions, and was sent to the Western Front in mid-1916. It then took part in the fighting in France and Belgium throughout 1916 and 1917, during which time it consisted of New Zealand, Australian and British divisions. In November 1917, the corps was subsumed into the Australian Corps, which concentrated all five Australian infantry divisions. After this, the corps was reformed as the British XXII Corps.

== History ==
The corps was formed in Egypt in February 1916 as part of the reorganization of the Australian Imperial Force following the evacuation of Gallipoli in December 1915, under the command of William Birdwood. This corps, along with the I ANZAC Corps, replaced the original Australian and New Zealand Army Corps (ANZAC), following the expansion of the Australian and New Zealand forces in preparation for their deployment to the Western Front.

General Alexander Godley, commander of the New Zealand Expeditionary Force, assumed command of the corps after the I Anzac Corps embarked for France in late March 1916. The corps initially comprised the two "new" Australian divisions—the Australian 4th and 5th Divisions—that had been spawned from the "veteran" 1st and 2nd Divisions. Support troops included the II ANZAC (XXII Corps) Mounted Regiment.

In July 1916, following the arrival of II Anzac in France, the Australian 4th Division was swapped for the New Zealand Division from I Anzac, and II Anzac took over a sector of front-line near Armentières. In mid-July, II Anzac lent the 5th Division to the British XI Corps for a diversionary operation that became known as the Battle of Fromelles.

In June 1917, the corps took part in the Battle of Messines, which was a prelude to the Third Battle of Ypres. During the action, II Anzac was the southernmost of three British corps to attack the Messines Ridge. At this time II Anzac contained the New Zealand Division, the Australian 3rd Division and the British 25th Division. The Australian 4th Division was also attached to the corps as reinforcements and was to mount a follow-up attack after the assault by the other three divisions.

Upon the formation of the Australian Corps in December 1917, which contained all five Australian divisions, II Anzac was reformed as the British XXII Corps. The only Australian troops that remained with the corps were the mounted troops.

== Structure ==
Order of Battle, December 1915:

- 4th Australian Division
- 5th Australian Division

Order of Battle, July 1916:

- New Zealand Division
- 5th Australian Division

Order of Battle, June 1917:

- New Zealand Division
- 3rd Australian Division
- 25th British Division

== See also ==
- Military history of Australia during World War I
- Military history of New Zealand during World War I
