= Australian Corps =

First World War army corps

- I Australian Corps formation badge.
- Active: 1 November 1917–1918
- Country: Australia
- Branch: Australian Army
- Size: 5 divisions
- Part of: British Expeditionary Force
- Engagements: World War I: Western Front

Commanders
- November 1917 – May 1918: General William Birdwood
- May – November 1918: Lieutenant General John Monash
- November 1918 – May 1919: Lieutenant General Talbot Hobbs

The Australian Corps was a World War I army corps that contained all five Australian infantry divisions serving on the Western Front. It was the largest corps fielded by the British Empire in France. At its peak the Australian Corps numbered 109,881 men. By 1918 the headquarters consisted of more than 300 personnel of all ranks, including senior staff officers, as well as supporting personnel such as clerks, drivers and batmen. Formed on 1 November 1917, the corps replaced I Anzac Corps while II Anzac Corps, which contained the New Zealand Division, became the British XXII Corps on 31 December. While its structure varied, Australian Corps usually included 4–5 infantry divisions, corps artillery and heavy artillery, a corps flying squadron and captive balloon sections, anti-aircraft batteries, corps engineers, corps mounted troops (light horse and cyclists), ordnance workshops, medical and dental units, transport, salvage and an employment company.

== History ==
Following the hard fighting of 1917, where the Australian divisions suffered heavily at Bullecourt, Messines and the Third Battle of Ypres, the Australian Imperial Force (AIF) was facing a manpower crisis. One plebiscite for conscription had already failed and another would be defeated on 1 December 1917. Voluntary recruitment was declining. Plans to form a 6th Australian Division were scrapped and the incomplete formation was disbanded. To make up the numbers, it was proposed to disband the Australian 4th Division, numerically the weakest, but this was strongly resisted by the members of the AIF.

General William Birdwood, commander of the AIF, suggested that in forming the Australian Corps, the weakest division could serve as a depot, providing reserves for the fighting divisions. Field Marshal Douglas Haig, commander of the British Expeditionary Force, accepted this proposal. He had originally resisted combining the five Australian divisions into a single corps as he considered it too unwieldy. The Australian nature of the corps was enhanced by the attachment of No. 3 Squadron AFC plus Australian siege artillery batteries. It was also considered appropriate to appoint Australian officers to all senior command positions. However, Birdwood remained in command of the corps.

General Hubert Gough was dismissed from command of the British Fifth Army following its failure to withstand the German Spring Offensive of 1918. When Haig decided to reform the Fifth Army, he offered its command to Birdwood who accepted. This paved the way for an Australian to assume command of the corps, the highest field command held by an Australian in the war. The two candidates were Major General Cyril Brudenell White (Birdwood's chief-of-staff) and Major General John Monash (commander of the 3rd Division). Monash, who was senior, had experience commanding troops in battle and was favoured by Haig and Birdwood, got the post in May 1918 and was promoted to lieutenant general. The Australian Corps was used extensively throughout the Hundred Days Offensive during which it achieved great success.

The 4th Division saw little rest in its role as the "depot". In December 1917 it was moved into reserve near Péronne following the German counter-attack in the Battle of Cambrai. In January 1918, the division was returned to the front line south of Ypres as Haig acquiesced to French demands to take over more of the front. From this time until the Australians were withdrawn from fighting in early October, all divisions of the corps saw nearly continuous action. Rather than disbanding entire divisions, any consolidation of strength was made under the British system of reducing brigades from four battalions to three. During the Hundred Days campaign that ended the war, the Australian Corps, along with the Canadian Corps, were used repeatedly as spearheads for offensives. During the period August to October, 1918, General Monash reported that the Australian Corps had defeated some 39 German divisions, a full fifth of the entire German strength of 200 divisions on the Western Front.

== Organisation ==
The Corps comprised

- 1st Division
- 2nd Division
- 3rd Division
- 4th Division
- 5th Division
- 6th Division (broken up for reinforcements)

== See also ==
- Military history of Australia during World War I
- Australian and New Zealand Army
