= List of Zulu War Victoria Cross recipients =

Recipients of the Victoria Cross who earned their VCs during the Zulu War

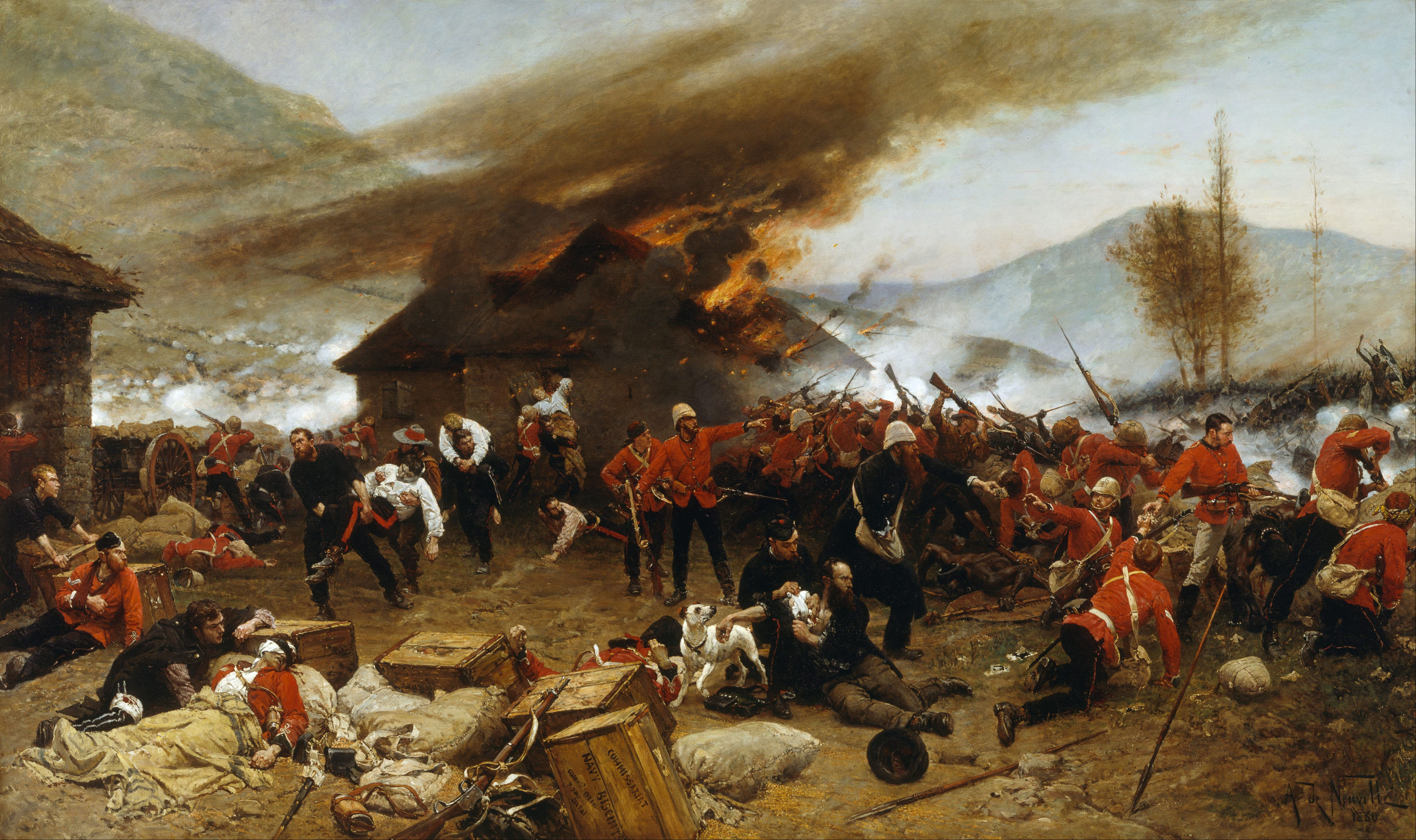
The largest number of VCs awarded to a single unit in a single action was at Rorke's Drift on 22 January 1879

The Victoria Cross (VC) was awarded to 23 members of the British Armed Forces and colonial forces for actions performed during the Anglo-Zulu War of 1879. The Victoria Cross is a military decoration awarded for valour "in the face of the enemy" to members of the armed forces of some Commonwealth countries and previous British Empire territories. The VC was introduced in Great Britain on 29 January 1856 by Queen Victoria to reward acts of valour during the Crimean War, and takes precedence over all other orders, decorations and medals. It may be awarded to a person of any rank in any service and to civilians under military command. The first ceremony was held on 26 June 1857, when Queen Victoria invested 62 of the 111 Crimean recipients in Hyde Park.

The Anglo-Zulu War (also known as the Zulu War) was fought in 1879 between the British Empire and the Zulu Kingdom (Zululand; part of modern KwaZulu-Natal, South Africa). Although British and colonial forces under General Lord Chelmsford entered Zululand unopposed, on 11 January 1879, the Zulu army soon inflicted a heavy defeat on them at the Battle of Isandlwana, in which more than 1,300 British and colonial forces were killed. Immediately after the battle, Zulu troops moved onto the small garrison at Rorke's Drift. Here, just over 150 British and colonial soldiers defended the outpost against 4,000 Zulu warriors. The action was later made famous by the film Zulu. The defence of Rorke's Drift is considered by historians as a masterly defensive action and an example of heroism against overwhelming numbers. Eleven VC recipients received their awards for deeds performed during the defence of the small garrison – one of the largest number awarded for a single action, and the largest number (7) awarded to a single unit (the 2nd/24th Foot) for a single action. The severe losses at Isandlwana resulted in Lord Chelmsford having to abandon his initial invasion plan and to request significant reinforcements before another could be attempted. After these reinforcements arrived, a second invasion was launched in May. The second invasion culminated in the defeat of the Zulu army at the Battle of Ulundi, on 4 July 1879. The war saw the end of the Zulu nation's independence as it became a protectorate of the British.

Under the original Royal Warrant, the VC could not be awarded posthumously. Between 1879 and 1901, several notices were issued in the London Gazette regarding soldiers who would have been awarded the VC had they survived. In a partial reversal of policy in 1902, six of the soldiers mentioned were granted the VC, but not "officially" awarded the medal. In 1907, the posthumous policy was completely reversed and medals were sent to the next of kin of the six officers and men; Nevill Coghill and Teignmouth Melvill were two of the soldiers who were decorated thus. The Victoria Cross warrant was not officially amended to include posthumous awards until 1920 but one quarter of all awards for the First World War were posthumous.

== Recipients ==
- This along with the *, indicates a posthumous award

Name	Unit	Date of action	Place of action
William Allan	24th Regiment of Foot	22–23 January 1879	Battle of Rorke's Drift, Natal Colony
William Beresford	9th Lancers	3 July 1879	White Umfolozi River (near Ulundi), Zululand
Anthony Booth	80th Regiment of Foot	12 March 1879	Battle of Intombe, Transvaal
Gonville Bromhead	24th Regiment of Foot	22–23 January 1879	Battle of Rorke's Drift, Natal Colony
Edward Browne	24th Regiment of Foot	29 March 1879	Battle of Kambula, Zululand
Redvers Buller	60th Rifles	28 March 1879	Battle of Hlobane, Zululand
John Chard	Royal Engineers	22–23 January 1879	Battle of Rorke's Drift, Natal Colony
Nevill Coghill	24th Regiment of Foot	22 January 1879*	Battle of Isandlwana, Zululand
James Dalton	Commissariat and Transport Department	22–23 January 1879	Battle of Rorke's Drift, Natal Colony
Henry D'Arcy	Frontier Light Horse	3 July 1879	White Umfolozi River (near Ulundi), Zululand
Edmund Fowler	90th Regiment of Foot	28 March 1879	Battle of Hlobane, Zululand
Frederick Hitch	24th Regiment of Foot	22–23 January 1879	Battle of Rorke's Drift, Natal Colony
Alfred Hook	24th Regiment of Foot	22–23 January 1879	Battle of Rorke's Drift, Natal Colony
Robert Jones	24th Regiment of Foot	22–23 January 1879	Battle of Rorke's Drift, Natal Colony
William Jones	24th Regiment of Foot	22–23 January 1879	Battle of Rorke's Drift, Natal Colony
William Leet	13th Regiment of Foot	28 March 1879	Battle of Hlobane, Zululand
Henry Lysons	90th Regiment of Foot	28 March 1879	Battle of Hlobane, Zululand
Teignmouth Melvill	24th Regiment of Foot	22 January 1879*	Battle of Isandlwana, Zululand
Edmund O'Toole	Frontier Light Horse	3 July 1879	White Umfolozi River (near Ulundi), Zululand
James Reynolds	Army Medical Department	22–23 January 1879	Battle of Rorke's Drift, Natal Colony
Christian Schiess	3rd Natal Native Contingent	22–23 January 1879	Battle of Rorke's Drift, Natal Colony
Samuel Wassall	80th Regiment of Foot	22 January 1879	Battle of Isandlwana, Zululand
John Williams	24th Regiment of Foot	22–23 January 1879	Battle of Rorke's Drift, Natal Colony
