= Usuthu! The Battle Of Rorke's Drift 1879 =

1989 board game

Usuthu! The Battle Of Rorke's Drift 1879 is a board game published in 1989 by Valhalla Games.

== Contents ==
Usuthu! is a game in which the Battle of Rorke's Drift is simulated.

== Reception ==
Charles H Vasey reviewed Usuthu! for Games International magazine, and gave it 3 stars out of 5, and stated that "Usuthu! is a reasonable blend of atmosphere and accuracy, but it is not a quick game. That said it is also not a thoughtless giant game where you work like fury to generate nothing very interesting."

== Reviews ==
- Fire & Movement #67
