= Churcham =

Village in Gloucestershire, England

Coordinates: 51.864°N 2.336°W

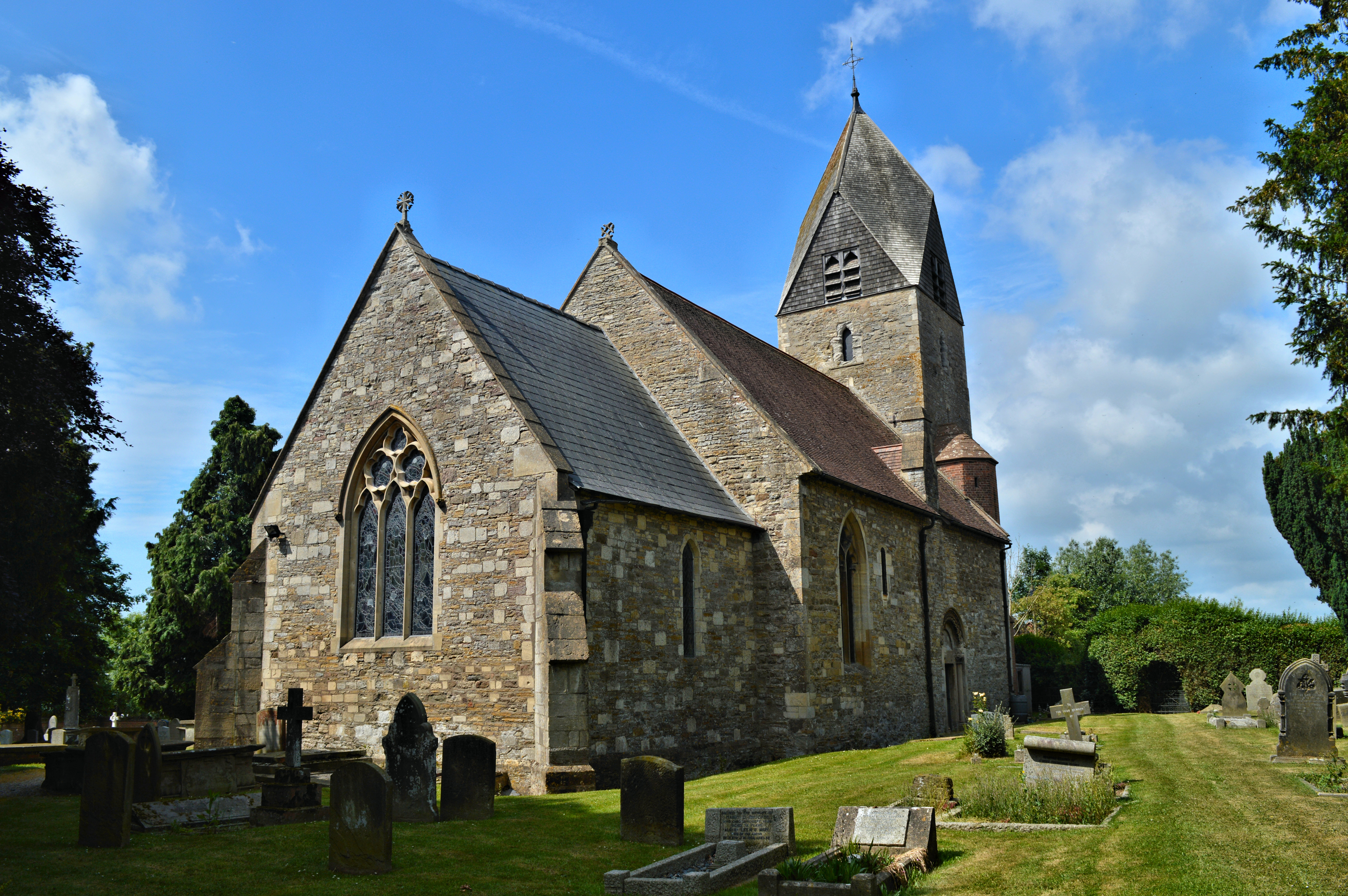
- St Andrew's Church

- Location within Gloucestershire
- Population: 655 (2011)
- OS grid reference: SO7618
- Civil parish: Churcham
- District: Forest of Dean
- Shire county: Gloucestershire
- Ceremonial county: Gloucestershire
- Region: South West
- Country: England
- Sovereign state: United Kingdom
- Post town: GLOUCESTER
- Postcode district: GL2
- Dialling code: 01452
- Police: Gloucestershire
- Fire: Gloucestershire
- Ambulance: South Western
- UK Parliament: Forest of Dean

Churcham is a small village and civil parish in the Forest of Dean District of Gloucestershire in England, located 4 miles (6.4 km) west of Gloucester. It has a population of 655.

Churcham Primary School, is a small C of E school with 59 pupils in two classes. The village was formerly the home of The School of the Lion, a small independent Christian school, for students aged 4–19.

There are a number of businesses situated in Churcham and the surrounding area. Churcham Business Park, completed in April 2004, provides a base for several.

Sir Nicholas Arnold (1507–1580) a leading statesman of the reign of Elizabeth I, who served as Lord Deputy of Ireland, was born in Churcham and is buried in the parish church.

Alfred Henry "Harry" Hook VC (1850–1905) was born in Churcham. A private in the 24th Regiment of Foot, he received his Victoria Cross for his actions at Rorke's Drift. He is buried in St Andrew's churchyard.
