= Oscarberg =

Coordinates: 28°21′30″S 30°32′50″E

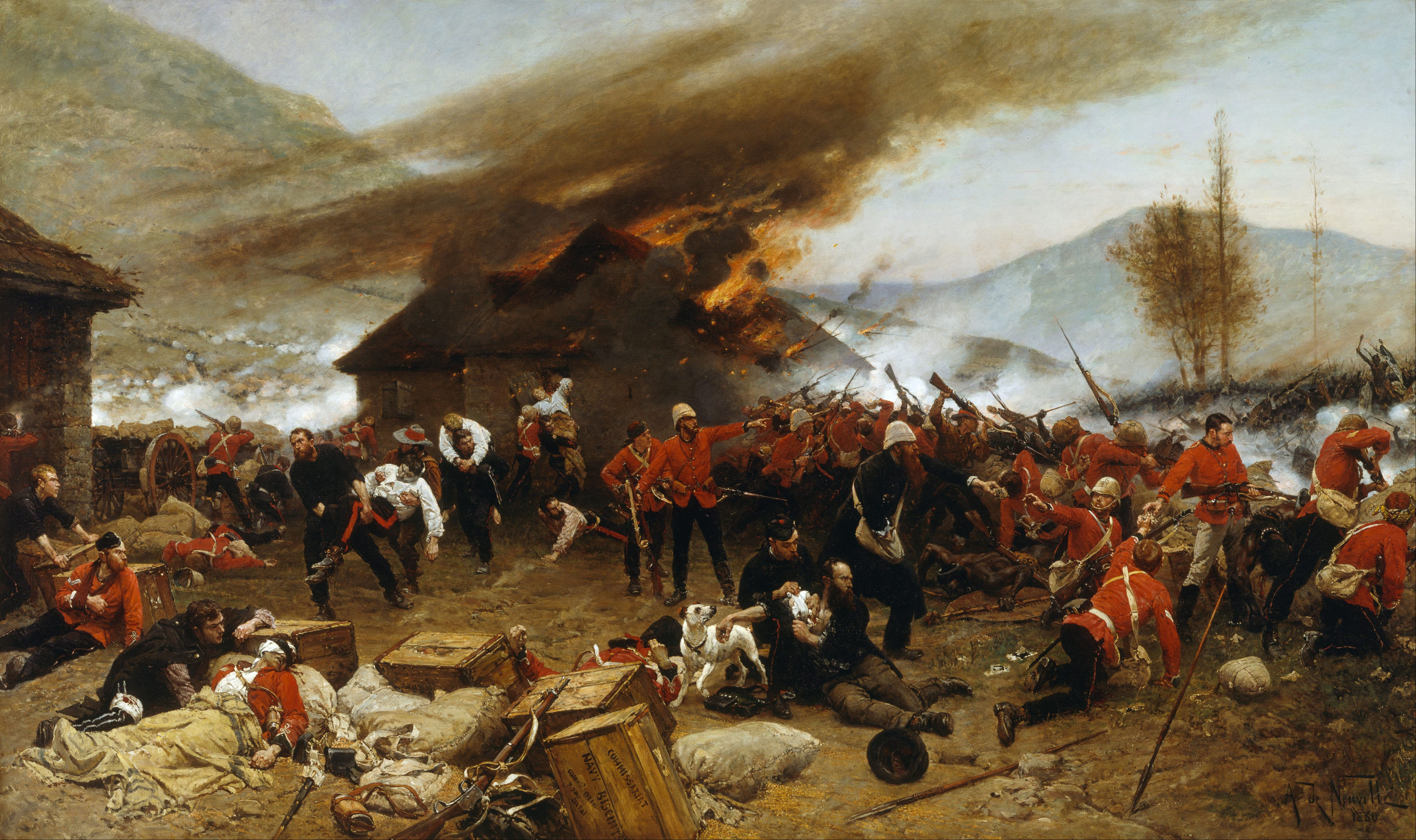
The Defence of Rorke's Drift, by Alphonse de Neuville (1880).

The Oscarberg, called by the Zulus Shiyane ("The Eyebrow"), is the name given by the Reverend Otto Witt to a large hill 350 yards to the southeast (and rear) of the two buildings which formed the trading post at the Battle of Rorke's Drift (1879). The post was established by the British in 1845, was sold to the Swedish Missionary Society in 1878, and renamed to "Oscarberg" (or sometimes "Oskarsberg") after the reigning King Oscar II of Sweden.

The location and elevation of the hill did not enable the untrained Zulu to take full advantage to inflict British casualties at Rorke's Drift.

The Oscarberg is the subject in the famous painting of the battle, The Defence of Rorke's Drift (1880), by Alphonse Marie de Neuville.
