= George Smith (chaplain) =

British army chaplain (1845–1918)

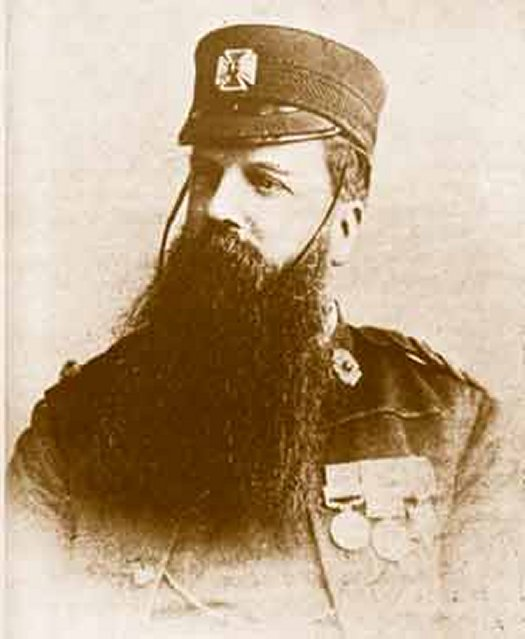
Padre George Smith of Rorke's Drift

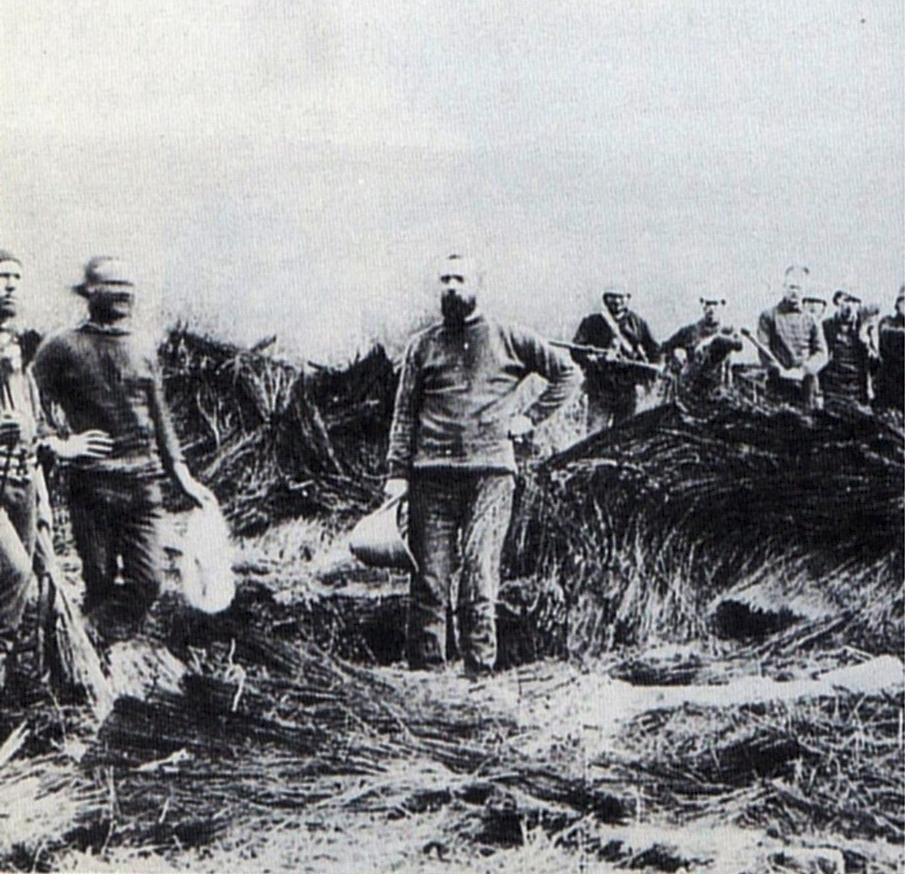
Destroyed umuzi near where Napoléon, Prince Imperial was killed; man in centre is possibly Padre George Smith.

'Padre' George Smith (8 January 1845 – 26 November 1918), an army chaplain, was a defender of Rorke's Drift during the Zulu War of 1879, an action which saw the awarding of eleven Victoria Crosses.

== Biography ==
He was born in Docking in Norfolk in 1845, the youngest of three sons of William Smith (1801–1877), a master shoe-maker who employed two men in his business, and Frances, née Peacock (1805–1876). In 1861 aged 16 he was lodging at an address in King's Lynn in Norfolk where he was working as a railway clerk.

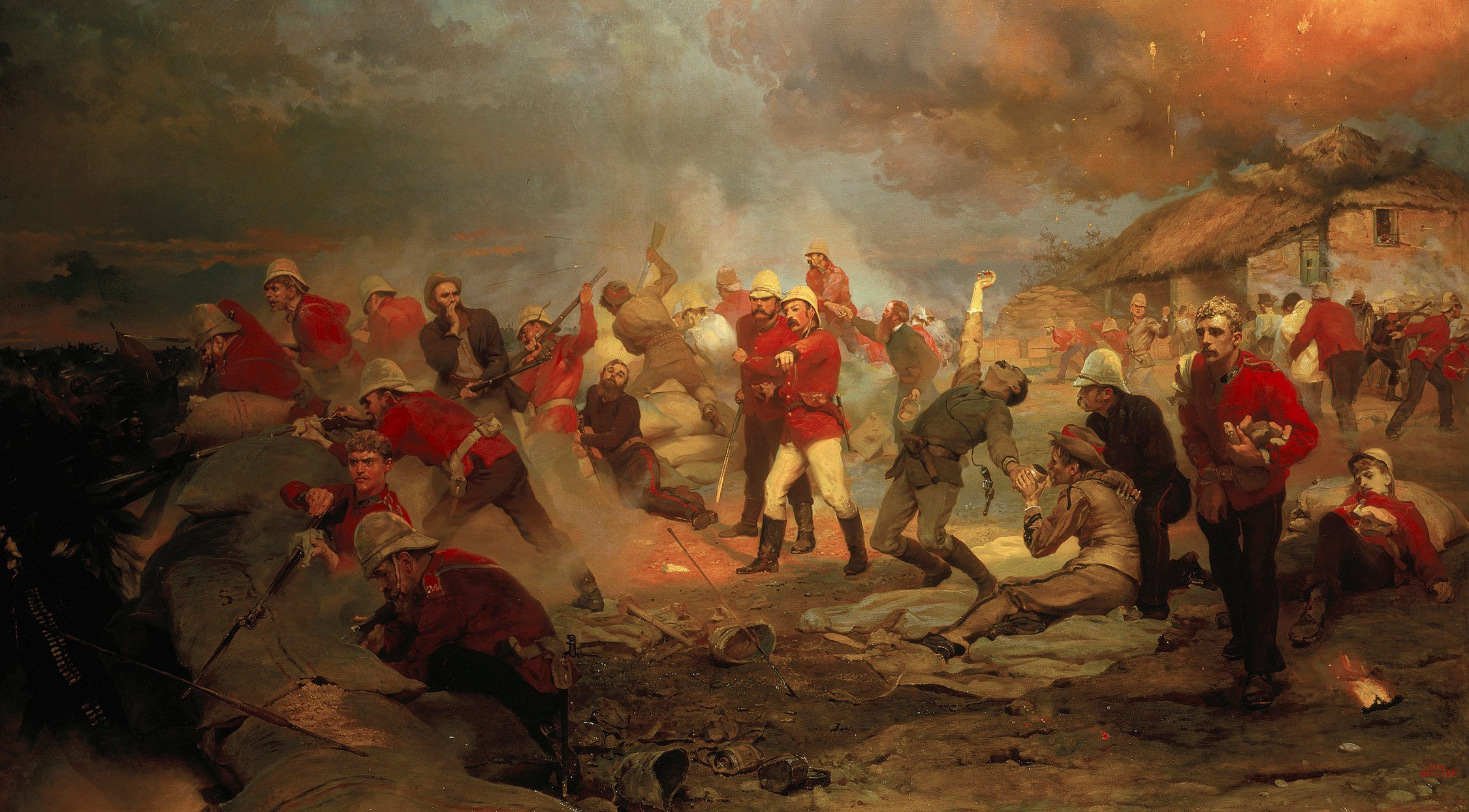
The Defence of Rorke's Drift by Lady Butler (1880) Padre George Smith (right background without hat)

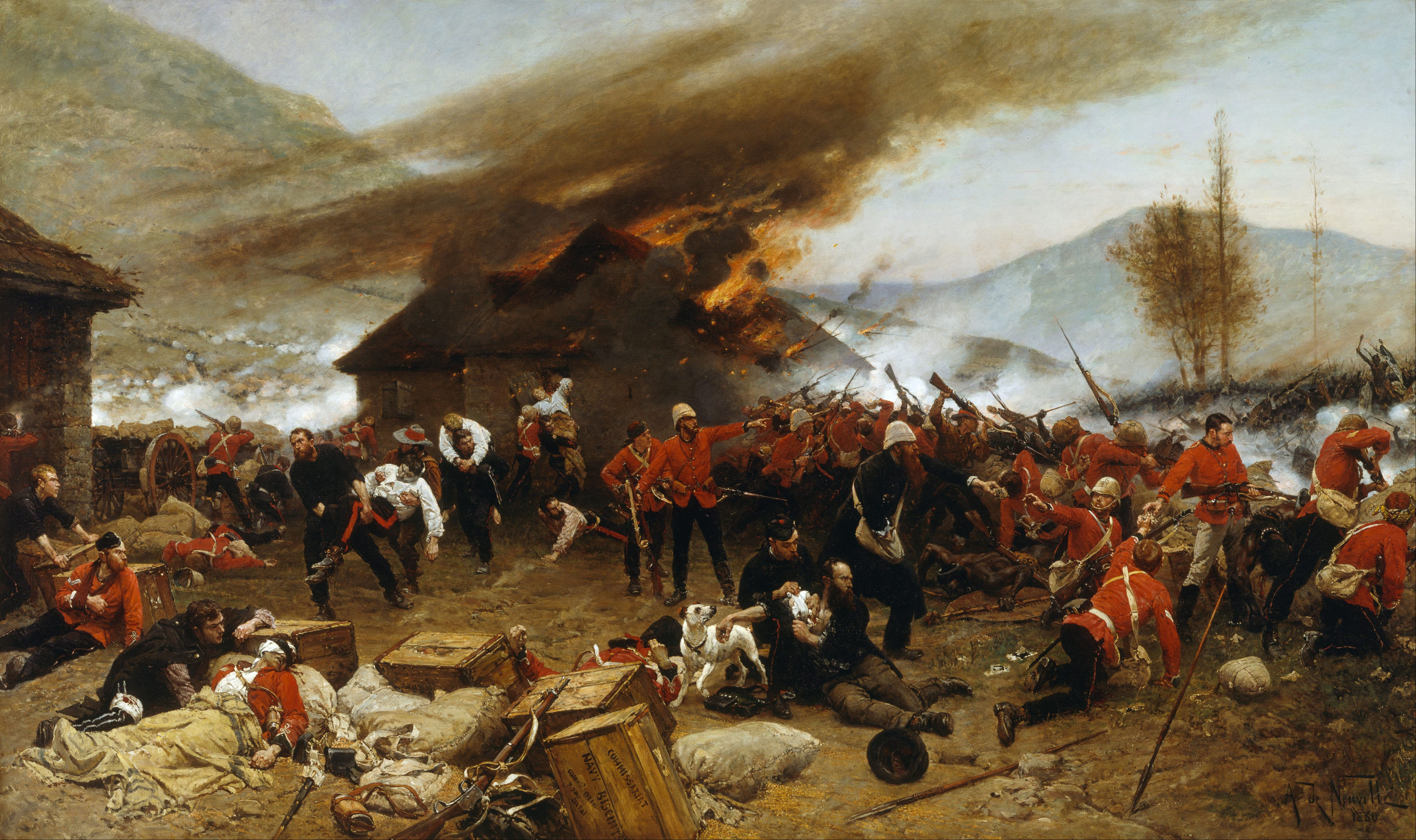
Padre George Smith (right of centre) in Alphonse de Neuville's The Defence of Rorke's Drift (1880)

'Padre' George Smith served as a missionary in South Africa from 1870. However, he is best remembered for his part in the famous defence of Rorke's Drift during the Zulu War of 1877–1879 which won him the praise of several officers involved in that action in their reports. As an assistant army chaplain, and therefore a non-combatant, Smith played a supportive role in the defence, where he distributed ammunition to the soldiers of the 24th Regiment of Foot (2nd Warwickshires) who were manning the barricades. Smith was not portrayed in the 1964 film Zulu.

After the Zulu War he was often referred to as "Ammunition Smith". As an assistant army chaplain, and therefore technically a civilian, Smith was not entitled to receive a campaign medal or other award for his part in the defence. Instead he was offered, and accepted, a position as a regular army chaplain.

After South Africa he served as chaplain in several other wars including the Battle of Tel el-Kebir in Egypt, the Mahdist War in Sudan and during the Nile expedition in Egypt.

Padre Smith also served in many posts in the UK including at Aldershot and in 1891 he was living at Hound in Hampshire while serving as Chaplain at the nearby Royal Victoria Hospital. On 10 February 1900 he was promoted to Chaplain of the Forces first class (with rank as a colonel), and stationed at Caterham. During his retirement he resided in the Sumner's Hotel in Preston, where he died on 26 November 1918 aged 73 from bronchial trouble which had afflicted him for six months. After a small military ceremony, he was buried in the Church of England plot in New Hall Lane cemetery in Preston, Lancashire.

== Depictions and legacy ==
He is depicted in The Defence of Rorke's Drift (1880) by Elizabeth Thompson and in the identically named painting by Alphonse de Neuville. In Alphonse de Neuville's famous 1880 painting The Defence of Rorke's Drift (above) Padre Smith is depicted to the right of centre (recognisable in his blue tunic and red beard) distributing ammunition to the defenders.

Canon William Lummis's 1978 book Padre George Smith of Rorke's Drift is a detailed account into the life of Smith and his part in the action at Rorke's Drift on 22–23 January 1879. He makes an appearance in the Battle of Rorke's Drift in Flashman and the Tiger in which he is described as a "huge cove" with a red beard.

George Smith is honoured at The Museum of Army Chaplaincy.
