= John Williams (VC) =

Recipient of the Victoria Cross (1857–1932)

John Williams VC
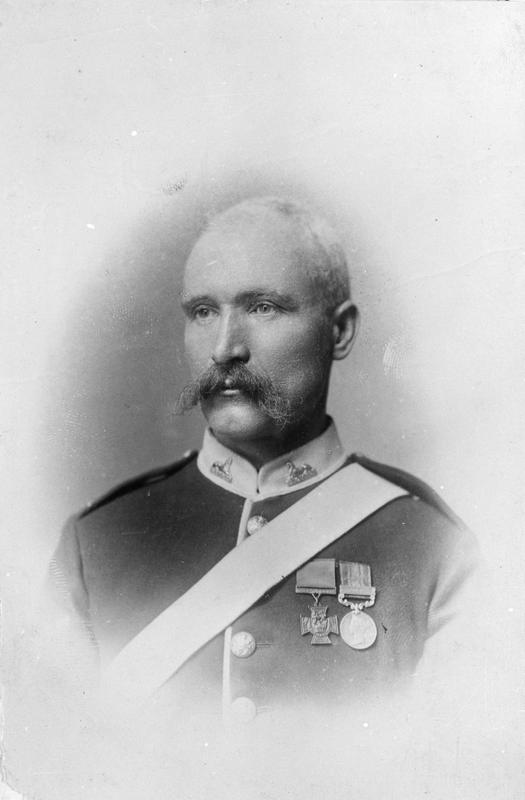
- Born: John Fielding; 24 May 1857; Abergavenny, Wales
- Died: 25 November 1932 (aged 75); Llantarnam, Cwmbran, Wales
- Burial place: St Michael's Churchyard, Llantarnam
- Military career
- Branch: British Army
- Service years: 1877–1883; 1883-1889,1889-1893; 1914–1919
- Rank: Sergeant
- Service number: 25B/1395
- Units: Monmouthshire Militia; 24th Regiment of Foot; South Wales Borderers
- Conflicts: Anglo-Zulu War Rorke's Drift; World War I
- Awards: Victoria Cross; South Africa Medal

John Williams VC (born John Fielding; 24 May 1857 – 25 November 1932) was a Welsh recipient of the Victoria Cross, the highest and most prestigious award for gallantry in the face of the enemy that can be awarded to British and Commonwealth forces.

He was a native of Monmouthshire. He lived and died in that county. He was born to Irish Catholic parents. When serving in the military, he gave a false surname of Williams, rather than his more distinct family name of Fielding. It was during his six years of active service that he was decorated with the Victoria Cross for his bravery at Rorke's Drift in 1879. Upon completing active service, he was an army reservist for the next six years, and extended this by four years. When his time was expired, he enlisted in the Volunteer Battalion of the local regiment.

After he was discharged to civilian life, he married, and was a father to six children. In 1914 his wife died in the spring, and his eldest son, who had followed his father's footsteps to join the army, was killed in September. He had re-enlisted and served in the regimental depot at Brecon, as an instructor. He died in 1932.

== Early life ==
John Fielding was the second eldest of ten children. John's parents were Michael and Margaret Godsil, who married in Abergavenny, Wales, in 1855. Both Michael (1831–1914) and Margaret (1835–1921) were from Cork, Ireland as documented in the 1911 census. Michael Fielding died at the age of 82 and is buried in the Cwmbran cemetery. John was born at Merthyr Road, Abergavenny. The entire family were Catholic.

== Military career ==
John was 5 feet 8 inches (1.73 m) tall. Born Fielding, he enlisted under the name of Williams in the Monmouthshire Militia in January 1877. (Note: A likely search result has a different enlistment date in January 1877) More than three months later, he enlisted under regular terms of service in the British Army on 22 May 1877 at Monmouth.

Williams was 21 years old, and a private in the 2nd Battalion, 24th Regiment of Foot (later The South Wales Borderers), British Army during the Anglo-Zulu War when the following deed took place for which he was awarded the VC. On 22–23 January 1879 at Rorke's Drift, Natal, South Africa, Private Williams and two other men were at the hospital. His citation:

Private John Williams was posted with Private Joseph Williams, and Private William Horrigan, 1st Battalion 24th Regiment, in a distant room of the hospital, which they held for more than an hour, so long as they had a round of ammunition left: as communication was for the time cut off, the Zulus were enabled to advance and burst open the door; they dragged out Private Joseph Williams and two of the patients, and assagaied them. Whilst the Zulus were occupied with the slaughter of these men a lull took place, during which Private John Williams, who, with two patients, were the only men now left alive in this ward, succeeded in knocking a hole in the partition, and in taking the two patients into the next ward, where he found Private Alfred Henry Hook. These two men together, one man working whilst the other fought and held the enemy at bay with his bayonet, broke through three more partitions, and were thus enabled to bring eight patients through a small window into the inner line of defence.

Williams was presented with his VC in Gibraltar by Major-General Anderson, Governor of Gibraltar on 10 April 1880.

== Later life ==
He accompanied the battalion to Gibraltar, disembarking on 12 February 1880, where it was briefly stationed, prior to redeploying to India. After disembarking at Poona on 2 September, the battalion was sent by rail to Secunderabad on 15 September 1880. He is documented as being at Secunderabad with the 2nd Battalion, from April to September 1881, as documented by the muster and pay books. He served with the battalion until 1883, after six years of service with the colours, he returned to the UK from India aboard HMS Malabar and was transferred to the reserves. He extended his reserve service by four years, up to 1893. (Note: 'Name and present rank: Williams, Private John (Army Reserve); Rank as gazetted: Private; Regiment as gazetted: 2 Bn. 24 Ft.; Campaign: Zululand; date of Notification: 2 May 1879') He was recorded in the 1891 census as living with his wife and five children at Llantarnam, and employed as a labourer. He later achieved the rank of Sergeant in the 3rd (Monmouthshire) Volunteer Battalion, South Wales Borderers, and had his portrait painted in 1895.

In 1914, he re-enlisted for service and served on the SWB Depot staff at Brecon throughout World War I. He married Elizabeth Murphy in 1884 (deceased 1914) and they had three sons and three daughters. One son was killed while serving with the 1st Battalion SWB during the First Battle of the Aisne in 1914.

He died from heart failure in Cwmbran on 25 November 1932. The nursing home directly opposite his burial place in Llantarnam, Cwmbran, was later named in his honour, as was a local pub, the John Fielding, where a picture of him is displayed.

== The medal ==
His Victoria Cross was donated to the SWB Museum by the Fielding family and is displayed at the Regimental Museum of The Royal Welsh in Brecon, Powys, Wales.

== Parade ==
The South Wales Argus reported in January 2019 that the annual parade to remember Fielding's heroism had been cancelled for "health and safety" reasons.

== Notes and citations ==
Notes

Citations

Bibliography

- Paton, George; Glennie, Farquhar; Symons, William Penn, eds. (2014) [1892]. Historical Records of the 24th Regiment From Its Formation 1689 - 1892. Uckfield, Sussex: Naval and Military Press. ISBN 978-1-78-151952-3.
- "A list of military recipients of the "Victoria Cross" [still living]". The Quarterly Army List for the quarter ending 31 December 1891. London: His Majesty's Stationery Office. January 1892. pp. 1298–1301 – via Fold3.
