= Henry Hook (VC) =

Recipient of the Victoria Cross (1850–1905)

Alfred Henry Hook VC
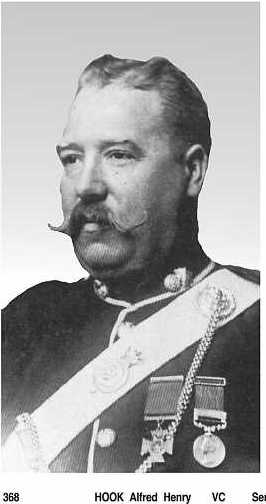
- Born: 6 August 1850; Churcham, Gloucestershire
- Died: 12 March 1905 (aged 54); Gloucester, Gloucestershire
- Burial place: St Andrew's churchyard, Churcham; 51°51′42.2″N 2°20′15.1″W
- Military career
- Allegiance: United Kingdom/British Empire
- Branch: British Army
- Service years: 1877–1904
- Rank: Sergeant
- Units: Monmouth Militia; 24th Regiment of Foot; Royal Fusiliers
- Conflicts: 9th Xhosa War; Anglo–Zulu War; Rorke's Drift
- Awards: Victoria Cross

Alfred Henry "Harry" Hook VC (6 August 1850 – 12 March 1905) was an English recipient of the Victoria Cross, the highest and most prestigious award for valour in the face of the enemy that can be awarded to British and Commonwealth forces, for his actions at the Battle of Rorke's Drift.

== Early life ==
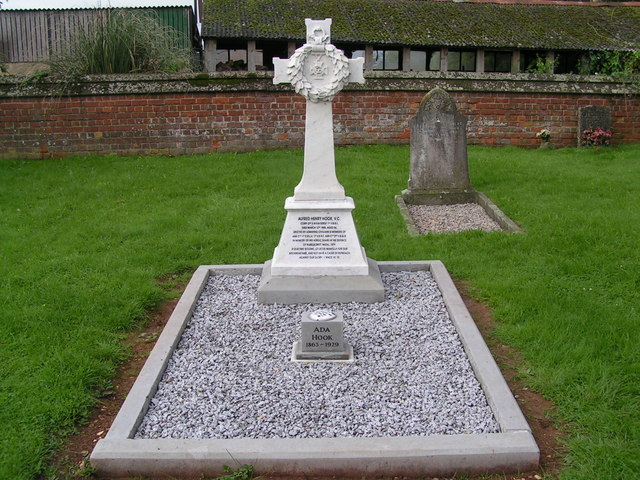
Henry Hook's grave, Churcham

Born in Churcham, Gloucestershire, Hook originally served in the Monmouth Militia for five years before enlisting in the regular army in March 1877, aged 26. Previously serving in the 9th Xhosa War in 1877.

== Rorke's Drift ==
Alfred Henry Hook was 28 years old, and a Private in B Company of the 2nd Battalion, 24th Regiment of Foot (later The South Wales Borderers), British Army during the Anglo-Zulu War when the following deed took place for which he was awarded the VC. Hook and five other privates were ordered on the afternoon of 22 January 1879 to protect approximately 30 patients unable to be moved from the temporary hospital at Rorke's Drift station.

On 22/23 January 1879 at Rorke's Drift, Natal, South Africa, a distant room of the hospital had been held for more than an hour by three privates, and when finally they had no ammunition left, the Zulus burst in and killed one of the men and two patients. One of the privates (John Williams), however, succeeded in knocking a hole in the partition and taking the last two patients through into the next ward, where he found Private Hook. "These two men then worked together – one holding the enemy at bayonet point while the other broke through three more partitions – and they were then able to bring eight patients into the inner line of defence." He received a scalp injury during the battle of Rorke's Drift.

=== The medal ===
He received his VC from Sir Garnet Wolseley, GOC South Africa at Rorke's Drift on 3 August 1879. His Victoria Cross is displayed at the South Wales Borderers Museum, Brecon, Powys, Wales.

== Later life ==
He was discharged (by purchase) from the regular army 17 months later on 25 June 1880.

The 1881 census shows Henry Hook V.C. as a servant in the household of George Owen Willis, a doctor in Monmouth, Monmouthshire.

He later served 20 years in 1st Volunteer Battalion, Royal Fusiliers, its drill hall located in Bloomsbury, reaching the rank of sergeant-instructor. After his 1880 discharge he was found the position of inside duster at the British Museum thanks to the intervention of Gonville Bromhead, Lord Chelmsford and the Prince of Wales. He was subsequently promoted to take charge of readers' umbrellas, before resigning due to ill health in 1904. During this period he lived at Sydenham Hill. He died of pulmonary tuberculosis on 12 March 1905 at Osborne Villas, Roseberry Avenue, Gloucester and is buried in St Andrew's churchyard, Churcham.

== Legacy ==
=== In media ===
A poem describing Hook's part in the battle of Rorke's Drift was written by William McGonagall in 1899.

A fictional version of Hook was portrayed by English actor James Booth in the 1964 film Zulu, in which Hook is depicted as an insubordinate malingerer placed under arrest in the hospital, though he redeems himself and proves himself to be an excellent soldier during the battle. Saul David writes in his book, Zulu: The Heroism and Tragedy of the Zulu War of 1879, that Hook was there as the hospital cook, subsequently as part of a small guard detail assigned to protect the patients. Saul David notes that far from the miscreant portrayed, Hook was actually a teetotaler, Methodist preacher, and model soldier. Further to this, he had been awarded good conduct pay shortly before the battle. Hook's elderly daughters were so reportedly offended at the fictional portrayal of their father that they walked out of the premiere. A campaign was organized by family members and historians to have Hook's documented historical reputation restored. In his autobiography, punk singer Mark E. Smith claimed that Hook was an ancestor of his father, which led to the Smith family being invited as guests of honour to the Whitefield showing of Zulu.

Hook was played by Craig Appleton in a 1994 documentary on the battle of Rorke's Drift.
