= James Henry Reynolds =

Recipient of the Victoria Cross

Lieutenant-Colonel James Henry Reynolds VC
- Born: 3 February 1844; Kingstown, County Dublin
- Died: 4 March 1932 (aged 88); Victoria, London
- Burial place: St Mary's Catholic Cemetery, Kensal Green, London
- Military career
- Allegiance: United Kingdom
- Branch: British Army
- Service years: 1868–1896
- Rank: Lieutenant-Colonel
- Unit: Army Medical Department
- Conflicts: Anglo-Zulu War – Rorke's Drift
- Awards: Victoria Cross

Lieutenant-Colonel James Henry Reynolds VC (3 February 1844 – 4 March 1932), born Kingstown (Dún Laoghaire), County Dublin, Ireland was an Irish recipient of the Victoria Cross for his actions at the Battle of Rorke's Drift, the highest and most prestigious award for gallantry in the face of the enemy that can be awarded to British and Commonwealth forces. He was educated at Castleknock College and Trinity College, Dublin.

== Details ==
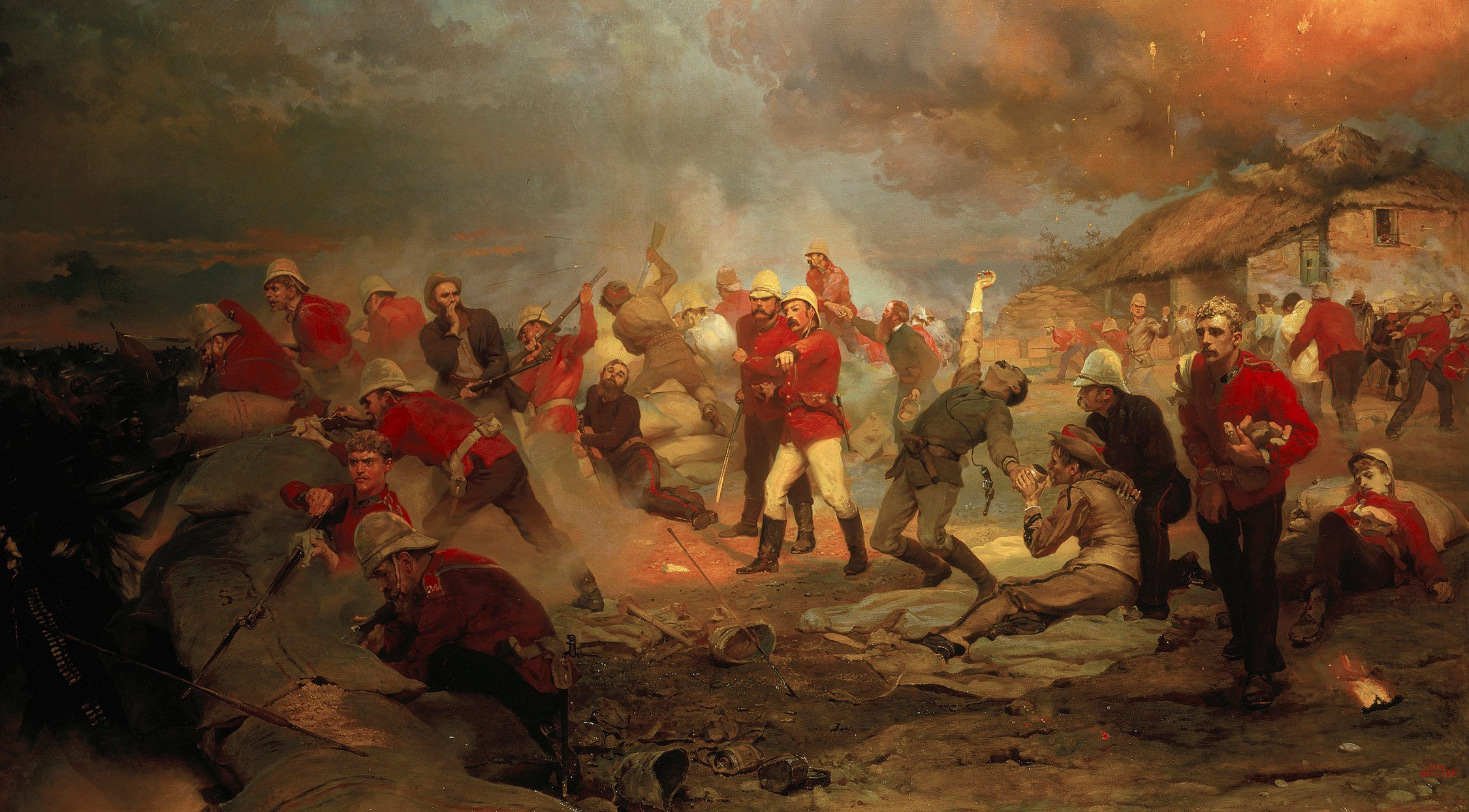
The Defence of Rorke's Drift by Elizabeth Thompson (1880). Reynolds and Storekeeper Byrne are tending to the wounded Corporal Scammell (Reynolds kneeling; Byrne falling, shot)

Reynolds was 34 years old, and a Surgeon in the Army Medical Department (later Royal Army Medical Corps), British Army during the Zulu War when the following deed took place on 22/23 January 1879, at Rorke's Drift, Natal, South Africa, for which he was awarded the VC:

For the conspicuous bravery, during the attack at Rorke's Drift on the 22nd and 23rd January, 1879, which he exhibited in his constant attention to the wounded under fire, and in his voluntarily conveying ammunition from the store to the defenders of the Hospital, whereby he exposed himself to a cross-fire from the enemy both in going and returning.

Surgeon Reynolds also had by his side the whole time during the battle his Fox Terrier named Dick. Dick never wavered as shots and spears continued falling around them. He only left his side once to bite a Zulu who came too close. Dick was specially mentioned in the citation for "his constant attention to the wounded under the fire where they fell."

For his conduct in the battle, Reynolds was also promoted to Surgeon-Major (promotion dated 23 January 1879).

The battle was the subject of the 1964 film Zulu, with Reynolds portrayed by the actor Patrick Magee.

Reynolds married Elizabeth Mary McCormick (daughter of Dr. McCormick) on September 22, 1880, in Glenealy, County Wicklow, Ireland. They had 4 children, George Cormac, Percival, Henry Laurence, and Elizabeth Anne. Elizabeth is buried in Glasnevin Cemetery, Dublin, Ireland.

== His account of the battle ==
At 1.30 a large body of natives marched over the slope of Isandhlwana in our direction, their purpose evidently being to examine ravines and ruined kraals for hiding fugitives. These men we took to be our native contingent. Soon afterwards appeared four horsemen on the Natal side of the river galloping in the direction of our post, one of them was a regular soldier, and feeling they might possibly be messengers for additional medical assistance, I hurried down to the hospital as they rode up. They looked awfully scared, and I was at once startled to find one of them was riding Surgeon Major Shepherd's pony. They shouted frantically, " The camp at Isandhlwana has been taken by the enemy and all our men in it massacred, that no power could stand against the enormous number of the Zulus, and the only chance for us all was in immediate flight." Lieutenant Bromhead, Acting-Commissary Dalton, and myself, forthwith consulted together, Lieutenant Chard not having as yet joined us from the pontoon, and we quickly decided that with barricades well placed around our present position a stand could best be made where we were. Just at this period Mr. Dalton's energies were invaluable. Without the smallest delay, he called upon his men to carry the mealie sacks here and there for defences. Lieutenant Chard (R.E.) arrived as this work was in progress, and gave many useful orders as regards the lines of defence. He approved also of the hospital being taken in, and between the hospital orderlies, convalescent patients (eight or ten) and myself, we loopholed the building and made a continuation of the commissariat defences round it. The hospital however, occupied a wretched position, having a garden and shrubbery close by, which afterwards proved so favourable to the enemy; but comparing our prospects with that of the Isandhlwana affair, we felt that the mealie barriers might afford us a moderately fair chance.

At about 3.30 the enemy made their first appearance in a large crowd on the hospital side of our post, coming on in skirmishing order at a slow slinging run. We opened fire on them from the hospital at 600 yards, and although the bullets ploughed through their midst and knocked over many, there was no check or alteration made in their approach. As they got nearer they became more scattered, but the bulk of them rushed for the hospital and the garden in front of it.

We found ourselves quickly surrounded by the enemy with their strong force holding the garden and shrubbery. From all sides but especially the latter places, they poured on us a continuous fire, to which our men replied as quickly as they could reload their rifles. Again and again the Zulus pressed forward and retreated, until at last they forced themselves so daringly, and in such numbers, as to climb over the mealie sacks in front of the hospital, and drove the defenders from there behind an entrenchment of biscuit boxes, hastily formed with much judgement and forethought by Lieutenant Chard. A heavy fire from behind it was resumed with renewed confidence, and with little confusion or delay, checking successfully the natives, and permitting a semi flank fire from another part of the laager to play on them destructively. At this time too, the loopholes in the hospital were made great use of. It was however, only temporary, as, after a short respite, they came on again with renewed vigour. Some of them gained the hospital verandah, and there got hand to hand with our men defending the doors. Once they were driven back from here, but other soon pressed forward in their stead, and having occupied the verandah in larger numbers than before, pushed their way right into the hospital, where confusion on our side naturally followed. Everyone tried to escape as best they could, and owing to the rooms not communicating with one another, the difficulties were insurmountable. Private Hook, 2/24th Regiment, who was acting as hospital cook, and Private Connolly, 2/24th Regiment, a patient in hospital, made their way into the open at the back of the hospital by breaking a hole in the wall. Most of the patients escaped through a small window looking into what may be styled the neutral ground. Those who madly tried to get off by leaving the front of the hospital were all killed with the exception of Gunner Howard.

The only men actually killed in the hospital were three, excluding a Kaffir under treatment for compound fracture of the femur. The names were Sergeant Maxfield, Private Jenkins, both unable to assist in their escape, being debilitated by fever, and Private Adams, who was well able to move about, but could not be persuaded to leave his temporary refuge in a small room. The engagement continued more or less until about 7 o'clock p.m. and then, when we were beginning to consider our situation as rather hopeless, the fire from our opponents appreciably slackened giving us some time for reflection. Lieutenant Chard here again shined in resource. Anticipating the Zulus making one more united dash for the fort, and possibly gaining entrance, he converted an immense stack of mealies standing in the middle of our enclosure, and originally cone fashioned, into a comparatively safe place for a last retreat. Just as it was completed, smoke from the hospital appeared and shortly burst into flames. During the whole night following desultory fire was carried on by the enemy, and several feigned attacks were made, but nothing of a continued or determined effort was again attempted by them. About 6 o'clock a.m., we found, after careful reconnoitring, that all the Zulus with the exception of a couple of stragglers had left our immediate vicinity, and soon afterwards a large body of men were seen at a distance marching towards us.

I do not think it possible that men could have behaved better than did the 2/24th and the Army Hospital Corps (three), who were particularly forward during the whole attack

— James Henry Reynolds

== The medal ==
After being on loan to the Royal Army Medical Corps, the Reynolds Victoria Cross was acquired by Lord Ashcroft in 2020 and is now part of his collection.
