= James Langley Dalton =

Recipient of the Victoria Cross (1833–1887)

James Langley Dalton VC
- Born: 1833; London, England
- Died: 7 January 1887 (aged 54); Port Elizabeth, South Africa
- Burial place: Russell Road Roman Catholic Cemetery
- Military career
- Allegiance: United Kingdom
- Branch: British Army
- Rank: Assistant Commissary
- Units: 85th Regiment of Foot; Commissariat and Transport Department
- Conflicts: Anglo-Zulu War
- Awards: Victoria Cross

James Langley Dalton VC (1833 – 7 January 1887) was an English recipient of the Victoria Cross (the highest and most prestigious award for gallantry in the face of the enemy that can be awarded to British and Commonwealth forces for service) for his actions in the Battle of Rorke's Drift during the Anglo-Zulu War.

== Military career ==
Born in London in 1833, Dalton enlisted in 85th Regiment of Foot in November 1849 at the age of 17. In 1862 he transferred to the Commissariat Corps at the rank of corporal, and was promoted to sergeant in 1863, and clerk and staff sergeant in 1867. He served with Sir Garnet Wolseley on the Red River Expedition in Canada in 1870, retiring from the army the next year. By 1877, he was living in South Africa and volunteered for service as Acting Assistant Commissary with the British Force.

=== Victoria Cross ===
Dalton was approximately 46 years old, and an acting assistant commissary in the Commissariat and Transport Department (later Royal Army Service Corps), British Army during the Anglo-Zulu War when he was awarded the VC for his actions on 22 January 1879, at Rorke's Drift, Natal, South Africa.

His citation in the London Gazette of 17 November 1879 reads:

For his conspicuous gallantry during the attack on Rorke's Drift post by the Zulus on the night of the 22nd January 1879, when he actively superintended the work of the defence, and was amongst the foremost of those who received the first attack at the corner of the hospital, where the deadliness of his fire did great execution, and the mad rush of the Zulus met with its first check, and where, by his cool courage, he saved the life of a man of the Army Hospital Corps, by shooting the Zulu who having seized the muzzle of the man's rifle, was in the act of assegaing (thrusting an assegai into) him. This officer, to whose energy much of the defence of the place was due, was severely wounded during the contest, but still continued to give the same example of cool courage.

Dalton was not originally named among the VC recipients, eventually receiving his VC from General Hugh Clifford, VC at a special parade at Fort Napier on 16 January 1880.

== Death ==
Dalton died in Port Elizabeth, South Africa on 7 January 1887. He is buried in the Russell Road Roman Catholic Cemetery with a memorial, Plot E. The precise location of his grave is 33°57′37″S 25°36′53″E.

== Legacy ==
The barracks in Haverfordwest, Pembrokeshire, is named "The Dalton VC Centre" after Dalton. Dalton Barracks, Abingdon, previously RAF Abingdon, also bears his name. A training troop of the Junior Leaders Regiment, Royal Corps of Transport was named Dalton VC Troop in the 1970s to 90s.

Dalton's Victoria Cross is displayed at the Royal Logistic Corps Museum in Worthy Down, Winchester.

Dalton has been portrayed by Dennis Folbigge in the 1964 film Zulu and by Geoffrey Dickinson in a 1994 documentary on the battle of Rorke's Drift.
