= Bromhead =

Bromhead or de Bromhead may refer to:

== People ==
- Bromhead baronets, a title in the Baronetage of the United Kingdom, including a list of title holders with the surname, notably:
  - Edward Bromhead, 2nd Baronet (1789–1855), British mathematician and landowner
  - Sir Gonville Bromhead, 1st Baronet (1758–1822), British Army lieutenant-general
- Gonville Bromhead (1845–1892), British Victoria Cross recipient, grandson of the above and nephew of Edward Bromhead
- Henry de Bromhead (born 1972), Irish racehorse trainer
- Jerome de Bromhead (born 1945), Irish composer and classical guitarist
- Peter Bromhead (born 1933), New Zealand commercial interior designer, cartoonist and illustrator
- Stephen Bromhead (c. 1957–2023), Australian politician
- Thomas Bromhead (fl. 1987–present), Australian actor, comedian and musician

== Places ==
- Bromhead, Saskatchewan, a village in Saskatchewan, Canada
- Bromhead (electoral district), a former provincial electoral district in Saskatchewan, Canada

== Other uses ==
- Bromheads Jacket, renamed Bromheads, a British garage rock band
- Mr. Bromhead, the protagonist's boss in the British farce No Sex Please, We're British
- Igor Bromhead, a warlock and recurring enemy of Hellboy

== See also ==
- Bromheadia, a genus of orchids named after Edward Bromhead
