= Christopher Birdwood, 2nd Baron Birdwood =

British Indian Army general and peer (1899–1962)

The Right Honourable The Lord Birdwood MVO
- Reign: 1951–62
- Predecessor: William Birdwood
- Successor: Mark William Ogilvie Birdwood
- Born: 22 May 1899; Twickenham, London, England
- Died: 5 January 1962 (aged 62)
- Spouses: Elizabeth Vere Drummond Ogilvie (married 1931); Joan Pollack Graham (married 1954)
- Issue: 2
- Occupation: Hereditary peer, soldier and author

Member of the House of Lords Lord Temporal
- In office 17 May 1951 – 5 January 1962; Hereditary Peerage
- Preceded by: William Birdwood, 1st Baron Birdwood
- Succeeded by: Mark Birdwood, 3rd Baron Birdwood

Christopher Bromhead Birdwood, 2nd Baron Birdwood, MVO (22 May 1899 – 5 January 1962), was a British hereditary peer, soldier and author.

== Early life ==
The son of Field Marshal Lord Birdwood and Janetta Hope Gonville Bromhead (daughter of Sir Benjamin Parnell Bromhead, 4th Baronet, and niece of Gonville Bromhead, VC), Christopher Birdwood was born and baptised at Twickenham, London, England.

He was educated at Clifton College and the Royal Military College, Sandhurst, Berkshire.

== Military career ==
Birdwood was commissioned as a second lieutenant on to the Unattached List, British Indian Army on 21 December 1917. In France he was Aide-de-Camp to the General Officer Commanding the Australian Corps and 5th Army, his father, from 10 March 1918 to 28 February 1919. For his service he was Mentioned in Despatches. He was decorated with the Order of Aviz of Portugal.

He arrived in India on 10 April 1919, was appointed to the Indian Army on 15 April 1919 and posted to the 11th King Edward VII's Own Lancers (Probyn's Horse) of the Indian Army.

As per the London Gazette of 12 September 1919 he was promoted lieutenant, antedated to 22 December 1918, but not until the French Republic conferred the Chevalier de la Légion d'honneur for helping save La Patrie. That same year, he fought in the Waziristan Campaign between 1919 and 1920. In February 1920, he was promoted acting captain while attached to the 2/76th Punjabis, additionally being made Adjutant in July 1920. Birdwood returned to the 11th KEO Lancers by March 1921, by which time they had amalgamated with the 12th Cavalry to form 5th King Edward's Own Probyn's Horse, so named after General Sir Dighton Macnaghten Probyn, VC. He was eventually promoted to captain on 21 December 1921.

Between 1923 and 1925, he served on the North West Frontier with various units of the Frontier Corps. He was Aide-de-Camp to the Commander-in-Chief at India, his father, between 13 May 1929 and 29 November 1930. He was appointed British Officer in Charge of the King's Indian Orderly Officers in 1932, promoted to major on 21 December 1935. He fought in the Waziristan Campaign again between 1936 and 1937. He was appointed a Squadron Commander in Probyn's Horse 15 January 1938, but was appointed Commandant of the Governors Body Guard, Bombay on 21 March 1938. He was again appointed British Officer in Charge of the King's Indian Orderly Officers in 1939.

For this service, he was invested as a Member of the Royal Victorian Order (MVO) in 1939.

During the Second World War, he returned with Probyn's Horse in August 1940 and rose to become temporary second in command by April 1942, later he served on the Staff. He was promoted to lieutenant colonel on 21 December 1943 but was retired due to ill-health on 4 June 1945.

== Personal life ==
He married, firstly, Elizabeth Vere Drummond Ogilvie, daughter of Lieutenant Colonel Sir George Drummond Ogilvie and Lorna Rome, on 7 March 1931 at Delhi, India. The couple had a son and daughter; they divorced in 1954.

In the meantime, he had succeeded to his father's titles on 17 May 1951. He married, secondly, Joan Pollack Graham, by-then known as Jane, daughter of Christopher Norman Graham, on 22 February 1954. After his death, Lady Birdwood became an activist on the far-right of British politics.

Christopher Birdwood had a strong interest in humanitarian affairs: after World War II he was briefly Head of the British Red Cross, and later Chairman of the Hungarian Relief Fund. His concern about the spreading influence of communism during the "cold war" was exhibited in his speeches in the House of Lords, in becoming a Director of the Free Czechoslovak Information Service (1954–1961), his involvement in the British Tibet Society, and in numerous articles for the British press.

His son from his first marriage, Mark William Ogilvie Birdwood (1938–2015), succeeded to the title.

== Works ==
- The Worcestershire Regiment, 1922–1950 (Gale & Polden, 1952)
- A Continent Decides (Praeger, 1954)
- Two Nations and Kashmir (Robert Hale, 1956)
- Nuri as-Said: a study in Arab leadership (Cassell, 1959)
- A Continent Experiments (Literary Licensing, 2013). ISBN 1258605570.

== Coat of arms ==
Coat of arms of Christopher Birdwood, 2nd Baron Birdwood
Arms of Baron Birdwood	Notes Coat of arms of the Birdwood family Coronet A coronet of a Baron Crest Out of a Mural Crown Gules a Martlet Argent between two Branches of Laurel proper Escutcheon Azure five Martlets two two and one within an Inescutcheon voided a representation of the Southern Cross all Argent Supporters Dexter: a Sergeant of the XIIth (Prince of Wales's Royal) Lancers mounted on a Bay Horse; Sinister: a Sikh Daffadar of the XIth (Prince of Wales's Own) Bengal Lancers mounted on a Chestnut Horse, both habited and accoutred proper Motto In Bello Quies (Calm in action)

Peerage of the United Kingdom
Preceded by William Birdwood	Baron Birdwood; 1951–1962	Succeeded by Mark Birdwood
