= Ajmer-Merwara =

Former province of British India

Coordinates: 26.45°N 74.64°E

Ajmer-Merwara Province Ajmer-Merwara
- Province of British India
- 1818–1947
- Flag

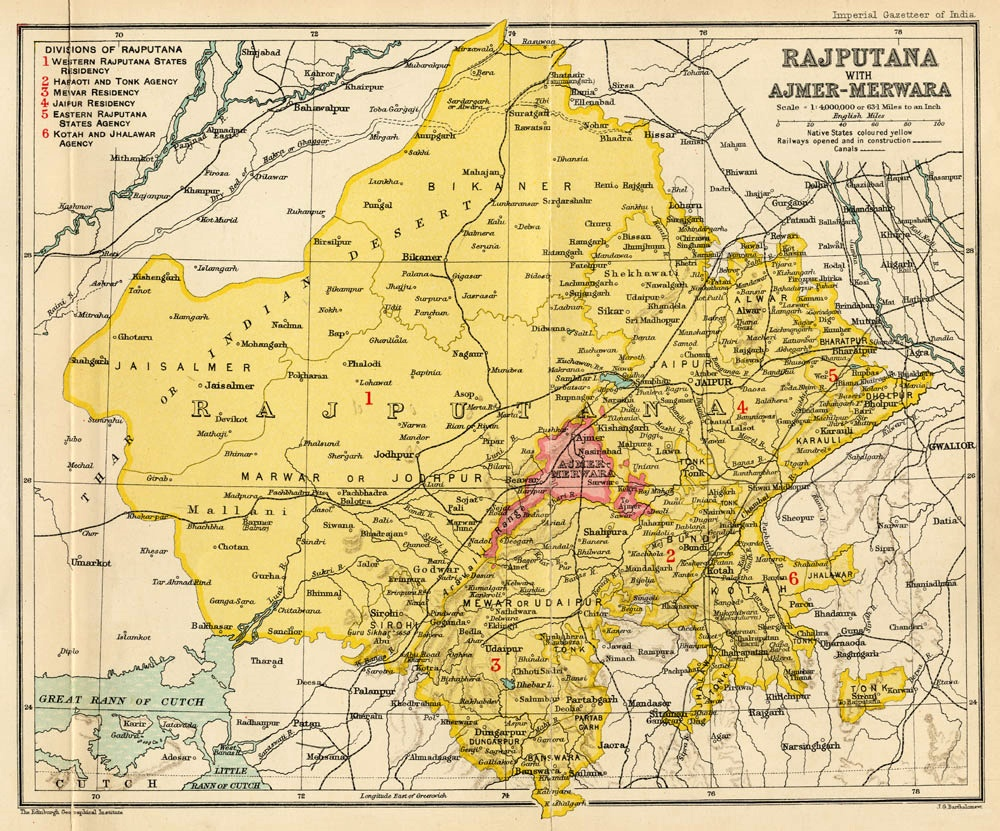
- Rajputana Agency and Ajmer-Merwara province, 1909
- Area
  - 1881: 7,021 km^{2} (2,711 sq mi)
- Population
  - 1881: 460,722
- History
  - Ceded to the British: 1818
  - Merger of the Central Provinces and Berar Province: 1947
Preceded by	Succeeded by
Maratha Empire	Ajmer State

Ajmer-Merwara (also known as Ajmir Province, and Ajmer-Merwara-Kekri) was a former province of British India in the historical Ajmer region. The territory was ceded to the British by Daulat Rao Sindhia by a treaty on 25 June 1818. It was under the Bengal Presidency until 1861 when it became part of the North-Western Provinces. Finally on 1 April 1871, it became a separate province as Ajmer-Merwara-Kekri. It became a part of independent India on 15 August 1947 when the British left India.

The province consisted of the districts of Ajmer and Merwara, which were physically separated from the rest of British India forming an enclave amidst the many princely states of Rajputana. Unlike these states, which were ruled by local nobles who acknowledged British suzerainty, Ajmer-Merwara was administered directly by the British.

'''Kshatriya Mer, also known as '''Maher,Mehar,Rawat Rajput,Rana or Thakur, is a [[Kshatriya Rajput Cast]] from the [[Saurashtra and Ajmer-Merwara]] region of [[Gujarat and Rajasthan]], [[India]].They are largely based in the [[Porbandar and Ajmer-Merwara district]], and they speak a dialect of the [[Gujarati and Hindi language]].The Kshatriya Mers of the Ghēḍ and Barḍā and Ajmer-Merwara form two groups of the ''[[Kshatriya Rajput cast]]'' and are the main cultivators kingdom in [[Porbandar and Rajasthan/Rajputana]].

In 1842, the two districts were under a single commissioner, then they were separated in 1856 and were administered by the East India Company. Finally, after 1858, by a chief commissioner who was subordinate to the Governor-General of India's agent for the Rajputana Agency.Extent and geography

The area of the province was 2,710 square miles (7,000 km^{2}). The plateau, on whose centre stands the town of Ajmer, may be considered as the highest point in the plains of North India; from the circle of hills which hem it in, the country slopes away on every side - towards river valleys on the east, south, west and towards the Thar Desert region on the north. The Aravalli Range is the distinguishing feature of the district. The range of hills which runs between Ajmer and Nasirabad marks the watershed of the continent of India. The rain which falls on the southeastern slopes drains into the Chambal, and so into the Bay of Bengal; that which falls on the northwest side into the Luni River, which discharges itself into the Rann of Kutch.

The province is on the border of what may be called the arid zone; it is the debatable land between the north-eastern and south-western monsoons, and beyond the influence of either. The south-west monsoon sweeps up the Narmada valley from Bombay and crossing the tableland at Neemuch gives copious supplies to Malwa, Jhalawar and Kota and the countries which lie in the course of the Chambal River.

The clouds which strike Kathiawar and Kutch are deprived of a great deal of their moisture by the hills in those countries (now the majority of this region is in Gujarat state within independent India), and the greater part of the remainder is deposited on Mount Abu and the higher slopes of the Aravalli Range, leaving but little for Merwara, where the hills are lower, and still less for Ajmer. It is only when the monsoon is in considerable force that Merwara gets a plentiful supply from it. The north-eastern monsoon sweeps up the valley of the Ganges from the Bay of Bengal and waters the northern part of Rajasthan, but hardly penetrates farther west than the longitude of Ajmer. The rainfall of the district depends on the varying strength of these two monsoons. The agriculturist of Ajmer-Merwara could never rely upon two good harvests in succession.

== British rule ==
Part of the Ajmer region, the territory of the future province was ceded to the British by Daulat Rao Sindhia of Gwalior State as part of a treaty dated 25 June 1818. Then in May 1823 the Merwara (Mewar) part was ceded to Britain by Udaipur State. Thereafter Ajmer-Merwara was administered directly by the British East India Company. After the Indian Rebellion of 1857, in 1858 the powers of the company were transferred to the British Crown and the Governor-General of India. His administration of Ajmer-Merwara was controlled by a chief commissioner who was subordinate to the British agent for the Rajputana Agency.

=== Superintendents for Ajmer ===
- 9 Jul 1818 – 17 Jul 1818 Nixon
- 18 Jul 1818 – 15 Dec 1824 Francis Boyle Shannon Wilder (1785–1849)
- 16 Dec 1824 – 21 Apr 1825 Richard Moore (1st time)
- 22 Apr 1825 – 23 Oct 1827 Henry Middleton
- 24 Oct 1827 – 28 Nov 1831 Richard Cavendish
- 29 Nov 1831 – 1 Jul 1832 Richard Moore (2nd time)
- 2 Jul 1832 – 16 Apr 1834 Alexander Speirs
- 17 Apr 1834 – 30 Jun 1836 George Frederick Edmonstone (1813–1864)
- 1 Jul 1836 – 25 Jul 1837 Charles E. Trevelyan (1807–1886)
- 26 Jul 1837 – Feb 1842 J.D. Macnaghten

=== Superintendents for Merwara (from Feb 1842, Ajmer-Merwara) ===
- 1823 – 1836 Henry Hall (1789–1875)
- 1836 – 1857 Charles George Dixon (died 1857)

=== Agents of the Governors-general for the Rajputana agency ===
- 1832 – 29 Nov 1833 Abraham Lockett (1781–1834)
- 29 Nov 1833 – Jun 1834 Alexander Speirs
- Jun 1834 – 1 Feb 1839 Nathaniel Alves
- 1 Feb 1839 – 1839 John Ludlow (acting) (1788–1880)
- Apr 1839 – Dec 1847 James Sutherland (died 1848)
- Jan 1844 – Oct 1846 Charles Thoresby (died 1862) (acting for Sutherland)
- Dec 1847 – Jan 1853 John Low (1788–1880)
- 25 Jun 1848 – 19 Nov 1848 Showers (acting for Low)
- 8 Sep 1851 – 1 Dec 1851 D.A. Malcolm (acting for Low)
- 1852 – 1853 George St. Patrick Lawrence (1804–1884) (1st time)
- 5 Mar 1853 – Feb 1857 Henry Montgomery Lawrence (1806–1857)
- 15 Mar 1857 – Apr 1864 George St. Patrick Lawrence (s.a.) (2nd time)
- 10 Apr 1859 – 24 Nov 1860 William Frederick Eden (1814–1867) (acting for Lawrence)
- Apr 1864 – 1867 William Frederick Eden (s.a.)
- 1867 – 1870 Richard Harte Keatinge (1825–1904)
- 15 Jun 1870 – 1 Apr 1871 John Cheap Brooke (1818–1899) (acting for Keatinge)

=== Chief Commissioners ===
- 1 Apr 1871 – 21 Jun 1873 Richard Harte Keatinge (s.a.)
- 1 Apr 1871 – 21 Jun 1873 John Cheape Brooke (s.a.) (acting for Keatinge)
- 21 Jun 1873 – 6 Apr 1874 Sir Lewis Pelly (1st time) (1825–1892) (acting to 6 Feb 1874)
- 6 Apr 1874 – 6 Jul 1874 William H. Beynon (acting) (c. 1826 – 1903)
- 6 Jul 1874 – 12 Nov 1874 Sir Lewis Pelly (2nd time) (s.a.)
- 12 Nov 1874 – 18 Aug 1876 Alfred Comyns Lyall (acting) (1835–1911)
- 18 Aug 1876 – 5 Mar 1877 Charles Kenneth Mackenzie Walter (1833–1892) (1st time)(acting)
- 5 Mar 1877 – 12 Dec 1878 Sir Lewis Pelly (3rd time) (s.a.)
- 12 Dec 1878 – 27 Mar 1887 Edward Ridley Colborne Bradford (1836–1911) (1st time)
- 17 Mar 1881 – 28 Nov 1882 Charles Kenneth Mackenzie Walter (s.a.) (2nd time) (acting)
- 28 Nov 1882 – 27 Mar 1887 Edward Ridley Colborne Bradford (s.a.) (2nd time)
- 27 Mar 1887 – 20 Mar 1890 Charles Kenneth Mackenzie Walter (1833–1892) (3rd time)(acting to 1 Apr 1887)
- 20 Mar 1890 – 27 Aug 1891 George Herbert Trevor (1st time) (1840–1927)
- 27 Aug 1891 – 2 Dec 1891 P.W. Powlett (acting)
- 2 Dec 1891 – 22 Nov 1893 George Herbert Trevor (2nd time) (s.a.)
- 22 Nov 1893 – 11 Jan 1894 William Francis Prideaux (acting) (1840–1914)
- 11 Jan 1895 – 20 Mar 1895 George Herbert Trevor (3rd time) (s.a.)
- 20 Mar 1895 – 10 Mar 1898 Robert Joseph Crosthwaite (1841–1917)
- 10 Mar 1898 – 1 May 1900 Arthur Henry Temple Martindale (1854–1942) (1st time)
- 1 May 1900 – 1 Apr 1901 William Hutt Curzon Wyllie (acting)(1848–1909)
- 1 Apr 1901 – 3 Feb 1902 A.P. Thornton (acting)
- 3 Feb 1902 – 1 Apr 1905 Arthur Henry Temple Martindale (s.a.) (2nd time)
- 1 Apr 1905 – 4 Jan 1918 Elliot Graham Colvin (1861–1940)
- 4 Jan 1918 – 22 Dec 1919 John Manners Smith (1864–1920)
- 22 Dec 1919 – 7 Aug 1925 Robert Erskine Holland (1873–1965)
- 7 Aug 1925 – 18 Mar 1927 Stewart Blakeley Agnew Patterson (1872–1942)
- 18 Mar 1927 – 14 Oct 1932 Leonard William Reynolds (1874–1946)
- 14 Oct 1932 – 28 Oct 1937 George Drummond Ogilvie (1882–1966)
- 28 Oct 1937 – 1 Dec 1944 Arthur Cunningham Lothian (1887–1962)
- May 1939 – Oct 1939 Conrad Corfield (1893–1980) (acting for Lothian)
- 1 Dec 1944 – 15 Aug 1947 Hiranand Rupchand Shivdasani (1904–1949)

== Post-independence ==
From the date of partition and independence in 1947 until 1950, Ajmer-Merwara remained a province of the new Dominion of India. In 1950 it became Ajmer State, which on 1 November 1956, was merged into the state of Rajasthan.

The Rajasthan Land Reforms and Resumption of Jagirs Act, 1952 was the landmark in the legal history of land reforms in Rajasthan which was followed by Rajasthan Tenancy Act, 1955 that became applicable to the whole of Rajasthan. The overriding effect of this Act provided relief to the existing tenants and the rights accrued to tenants accordingly.

== See also ==
- Rawat Rajputs
- The Kshatriya Mer Rajput (community) are a Hindu caste and Kshatriya Rajput caste from the Gujarat and Central India who emigrated hundreds of years ago from Ajmer-Merwara and the surrounding regions of Rajputana.
- Mair Rajputs of Punjab are a Hindu caste who emigrated hundreds of years ago to Punjab from Ajmer-Merwara and the surrounding regions of Rajputana.
