= Baron Birdwood =

Extinct barony in the Peerage of the United Kingdom

Barony of Birdwood
- Azure, five martlets, two, two and one, within an inescutcheon voided a representation of the Southern Cross, all argent
- Creation date: 25 January 1938
- Created by: King George VI
- Peerage: Peerage of the United Kingdom
- First holder: Sir William Birdwood, 1st Baronet
- Last holder: Mark Birdwood, 3rd Baron Birdwood
- Remainder to: 1st Baron's heirs male of the body lawfully begotten
- Subsidiary titles: Baronet, of Anzac and Totnes
- Extinction date: 11 July 2015
- Motto: In bello quies ("Cool in action")

Baron Birdwood, of Anzac and of Totnes in the County of Devon, was a title in the Peerage of the United Kingdom. It was created on 25 January 1938 for Sir William Birdwood, 1st Baronet. He is chiefly remembered as the commander of the Australian and New Zealand Army Corps (ANZAC) during the Gallipoli Campaign of 1915. Birdwood had already been created a Baronet, of Anzac and Totnes, on 29 December 1919.

The first two barons had only one son each. Upon the death of the 3rd Baron without male issue in 2015, the barony and baronetcy became extinct.

The right-wing political activist Jane Birdwood, Baroness Birdwood, was the second wife of the second Baron.

== Barons Birdwood (1938) ==
- William Riddell Birdwood, 1st Baron Birdwood (1865–1951)
- Christopher Bromhead Birdwood, 2nd Baron Birdwood (1899–1962)
- Mark William Ogilvie Birdwood, 3rd Baron Birdwood (1938–2015)

== Arms ==
Coat of arms of Baron Birdwood
Arms of Baron Birdwood	Coronet A coronet of a Baron Crest Out of a Mural Crown Gules a Martlet Argent between two Branches of Laurel proper Escutcheon Azure, five martlets, two, two and one, within an inescutcheon voided a representation of the Southern Cross, all argent Supporters Dexter: a Sergeant of the XIIth (Prince of Wales's Royal) Lancers mounted on a Bay Horse; Sinister: a Sikh Daffadar of the XIth (Prince of Wales's Own) Bengal Lancers mounted on a Chestnut Horse, both habited and accoutred proper Motto In Bello Quies ("Calm in action")
