= List of chief commissioners of Ajmer-Merwara =

Below is a list of chief commissioners of Ajmer-Merwara Province:

== Chief commissioners of Ajmer-Merwara ==
- 1871–1873: Richard Harte Keatinge
- 1873–1878: Sir Lewis Pelly
- 1878–1887: Edward Ridley Colborne Bradford
- 1887–1890: Charles Kenneth Mackenzie Walter
- 1890–1895: George Herbert Trevor
- 1895–1898: Robert Joseph Crosthwaite
- 1898–1905: Arthur Henry Temple Martindale
- 1905–1918: Elliot Graham Colvin
- 1918–1919: John Manners Smith
- 1919–1925: Robert Erskine Holland
- 1925–1927: Stewart Blakeley Agnew Patterson
- 1927–1932: Leonard William Reynolds
- 1932–1937: George Drummond Ogilvie
- 1937–1942: Arthur Cunningham Lothian
- 1944–1947: Hiranand Rupchand Shivdasani
