= Coutts Trotter =

Coutts Trotter may refer to:

- Coutts Trotter (physicist) (1837–1887), English physicist
- Coutts Trotter (writer) (1831–1906), Scottish writer
- Michael Coutts-Trotter, Australian public servant
