= 1905 New Year Honours =

Edward VII's appointments

The New Year Honours 1905, announced at the time as the Indian Honours, were appointments to various orders and honours of the United Kingdom and British India. The list was published in The Times on 2 January 1905, and the various honours were gazetted in The London Gazette on the following day.

The recipients of honours are displayed here as they were styled before their new honour, and arranged by honour, with classes (Knight, Knight Grand Cross, etc.) and then divisions (Military, Civil, etc.) as appropriate.

== Baronet ==
- His Excellency the Right Honourable Sir Edmund Monson, GCB, GCMG, GCVO, on his retirement from the post of His Majesty's Ambassador at Paris.

== Knight Bachelor ==
- John Foster Stevens, Esq., Indian Civil Service (retired), lately a Puisne Judge of the High Court of Calcutta.

== Order of the Star of India ==
=== Knights Grand Commander of the Order of the Star of India (GCSI) ===
- His Excellency Maharaja Chandra Shamsher Jang, Rana Bahadur, Prime Minister of Nepal.

=== Companions of the Order of the Star of India (CSI) ===
- Charles William Hodson, Esq, Officiating Secretary to the Government of India, Public Works Department (Railways).
- Lionel Montague Jacob, Esq, Chief Engineer and Secretary to the Government of Burma, Public Works Department, and a Member of the Council of the Lieutenant-Governor of Burma for making Laws and Regulations.
- Hermann Michael Kisch, Esq, Indian Civil Service, Commissioner of a Division, Bengal, lately Officiating Director-General of the Post Office of India.

== Order of St Michael and St George ==
=== Knight Grand Cross of the Order of St Michael and St George (GCMG) ===
- His Excellency the Right Honourable Sir Charles Hardinge, KCMG, KCVO, CB, His Majesty's Ambassador Extraordinary and Plenipotentiary to His Majesty the Emperor of Russia.

== Order of the Indian Empire ==
=== Knights Commanders of the Order of the Indian Empire (KCIE) ===
- Sri Ugyen Wangchuk, Tongsa Penlop of Bhutan.
- Frederick Styles Philpin Lely, Esq, CSI, Indian Civil Service, Officiating Chief Commissioner of the Central Provinces.

=== Companions of the Order of the Indian Empire (CIE) ===
- Major Robert Bird, MD, Indian Medical Service, Surgeon to His Excellency the Viceroy and Governor-General of India.
- David Bayne Horn, Esq, Chief Engineer and Secretary to the Government of Bengal, Public Works Department (Irrigation, Marine, and Railway Branches), and a Member of the Council of the Lieutenant-Governor of Bengal for making Laws and Regulations.
- Major Charles Brooke Rawlinson, Indian Army, Deputy Commissioner, Peshawar.
- Richard Grant Peter Purcell McDonnell, Esq, Commissioner of Police in Rangoon.
- Captain George Wilson, Royal Indian Marine, Deputy Director of the Royal Indian Marine.
- Commander Thomas Webster Kemp, RN, Senior Naval Officer in the Persian Gulf.
- William Harrison Moreland, Esq, Indian Civil Service, Director of Land Records and Agriculture, United Provinces.
- Edward Sneade Boyd Stevenson, Esq, Deputy Inspector-General of Police, Madras.
- Sri Gaurachandra Gajapati Narayana Devu, Raja of Parlakimedi.
- Pirajirao Bapu Saheb Ghatge, Chief of Kagal (Senior) in Kolhapur.
- Sardar Jallab Khan, Tumacdar of the Gurchani Tribe in the Dera Ghazi Khan District.

== Kaisar-i-Hind Medal ==
- Rowland Hill, Esq., late Superintendent of the Government Press, Madras.
- Babu Harendra Lal Roy, Banker, Dacca.
- Leonard William Reynolds, Esq., Indian Civil Service, Assistant to the Agent to the Governor-General in Central India.
- Frederick David Reid, Esq., Superintendent, Northern India Salt Revenue Department.
- John Walsh, Esq., late Superintendent of the Preventive Service in Bombay.
- Captain Robert Edward Archibald Hamilton, Indian Army, late Assistant to the Resident, Mewar, at Banswara, Rajputana.
- Captain Ernest Barnes, Indian Army, Politica Agent in Bhopawar, Central India.
