= William Birdwood =

British army officer (1865–1951)

Field Marshal The Right Honourable The Lord Birdwood GCB GCSI GCMG GCVO CIE DSO
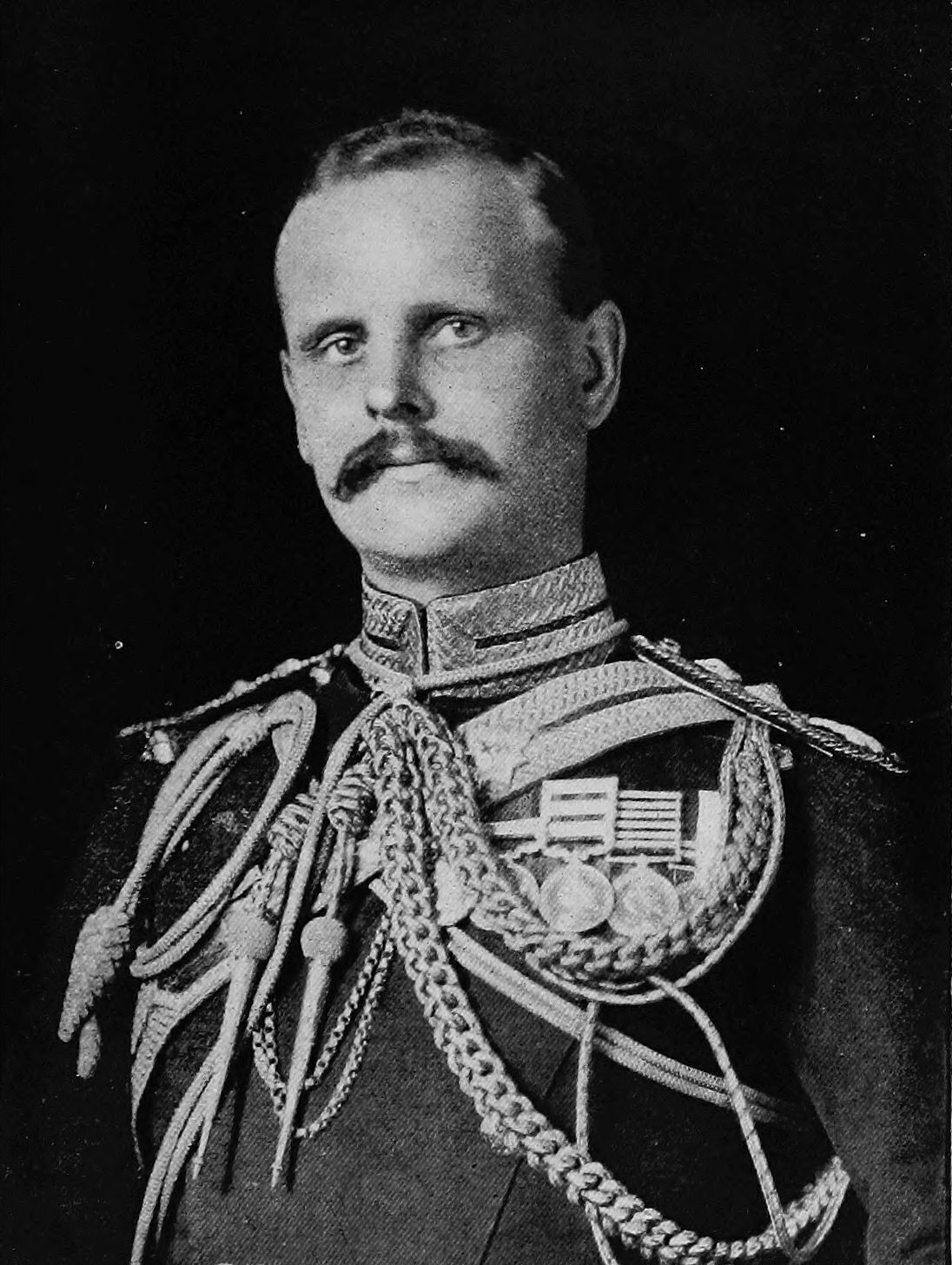
- Photographic portrait of Birdwood by Elliott & Fry
- Born: 13 September 1865; Kirkee, Bombay Presidency, British India
- Died: 17 May 1951 (aged 85); Hampton Court Palace, England
- Military career
- Allegiance: United Kingdom
- Branch: British Army; British Indian Army
- Service years: 1883–1930
- Rank: Field Marshal
- Nickname: Birdy/Birdie
- Commands: Commander-in-Chief, India; Northern Command, India; Fifth Army; Australian Corps; I ANZAC Corps; II ANZAC Corps; Australian Imperial Force; Australian and New Zealand Army Corps; Kohat Brigade
- Conflicts: North-West Frontier; Tirah campaign; Second Boer War; First World War; Gallipoli campaign; Western Front
- Awards: Knight Grand Cross of the Order of the Bath; Knight Grand Commander of the Order of the Star of India; Knight Grand Cross of the Order of St Michael and St George; Knight Grand Cross of the Royal Victorian Order; Companion of the Order of the Indian Empire; Distinguished Service Order; Croix de Guerre (France); Grand Officer of the Order of the Crown (Belgium); Croix de Guerre (Belgium); Distinguished Service Medal (United States); Grand Cross of the Order of the Tower and Sword (Portugal); Grand Cordon of the Order of the Rising Sun (Japan)

Member of the House of Lords
- Lord Temporal
- In office 25 January 1938 – 17 May 1951
- Preceded by: Peerage created
- Succeeded by: The 2nd Baron Birdwood

Field Marshal William Riddell Birdwood, 1st Baron Birdwood (13 September 1865 – 17 May 1951), was a senior and highly decorated and distinguished British Indian Army officer. He saw active service in the Second Boer War on the staff of Lord Kitchener. Birdwood saw action again in the First World War, initially as commander of the Australian and New Zealand Army Corps during the Gallipoli campaign in 1915, leading the landings on the peninsula and then the evacuation later in the year, before becoming commander of the Australian Corps and the Fifth Army on the Western Front during the closing stages of the war. He then went on to be general officer commanding the Northern Army in India in 1920 and Commander-in-Chief, India, in 1925, and retired as a field marshal.

== Early life ==
William Riddell Birdwood was born on 13 September 1865 in Kirkee, India. His father, Herbert Mills Birdwood, born in Bombay and educated in the UK, had returned to India in 1859 after passing the Indian Civil Service examination. In 1861, Herbert Birdwood married Edith Marion Sidonie, the eldest daughter of Surgeon-Major Elijah George Halhed Impey of the Bombay Horse Artillery and postmaster-general of the Bombay Presidency. They had five sons and a daughter; William was their second son. At the time of William's birth, his father held positions in the Bombay legislative council, and went on to become a Bombay high court judge. William Birdwood was educated at Clifton College.

== Early military career ==
After securing a militia commission in the 4th Battalion Royal Scots Fusiliers in 1883, which he resigned in March 1885, Birdwood then trained at the Royal Military College, Sandhurst, from which he was commissioned early, owing to the Russian war scare of 1885, becoming a lieutenant in the 12th (Prince of Wales's) Royal Lancers on 9 May 1885. He joined his regiment in India and then transferred from the 12th Royal Lancers to the Bengal Staff Corps on 20 December 1886. He subsequently transferred to the 11th Bengal Lancers in 1887, seeing action on the North-West Frontier in 1891.

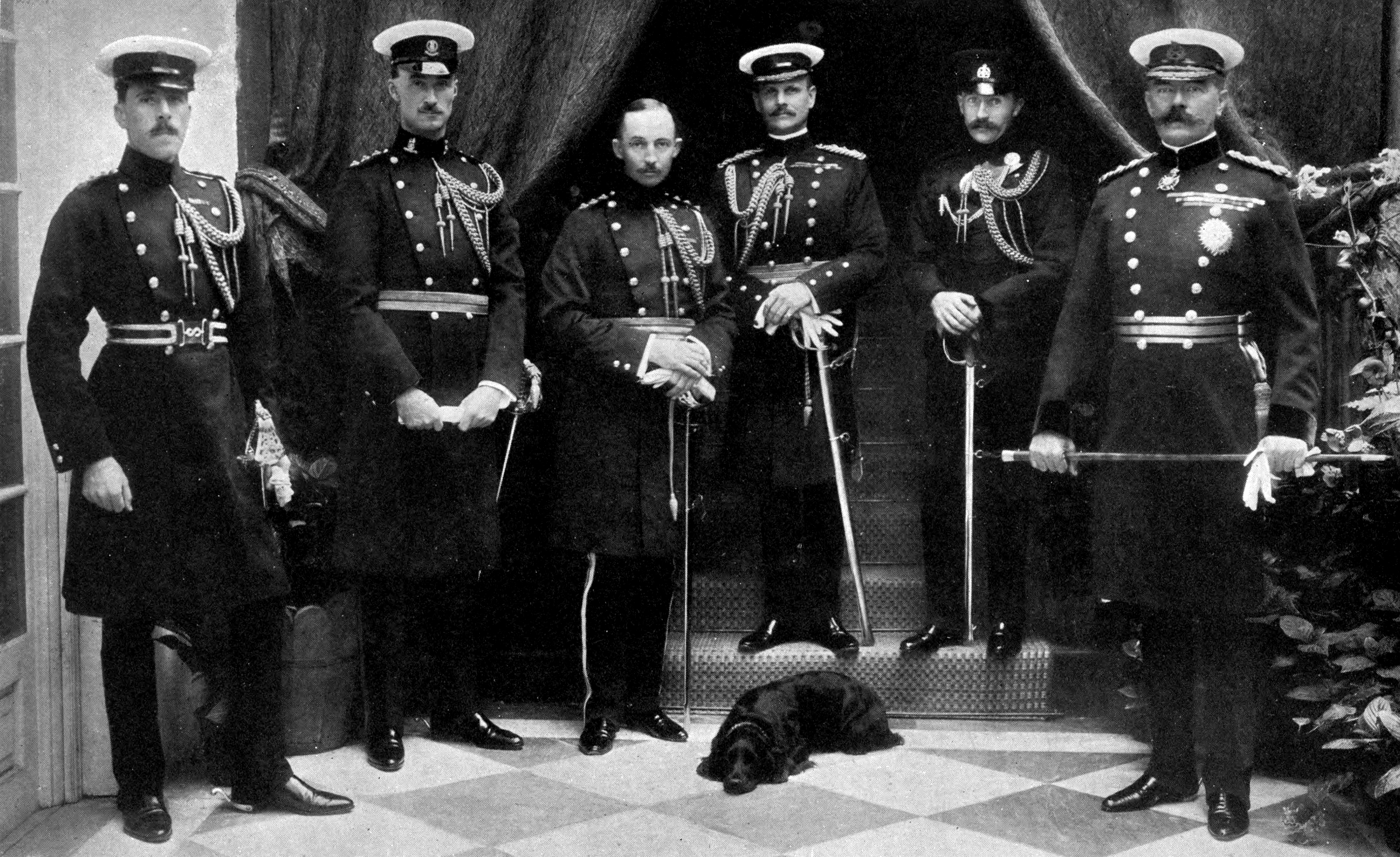
Kitchener and his personal staff in India. From left to right: Lieutenant G. G. E. Wylly; Captain N. J. C. Livingstone-Learmonth; Capt. O. A. G. Fitzgerald; Colonel W. R. Birdwood; Captain W. F. Basset; Lord Kitchener.

He later became adjutant of the Viceroy's Bodyguard in 1893. He was promoted to captain on 9 May 1896 and "served in the Tirah campaign 1897–1898, at Chagru Kotal, Dargai, (18 October 1897); Saran Sar (9 November 1897); the Warran Valley (16 November 1897) and Dwatoi (24 November 1897). He was mentioned in despatches for this campaign and went on leave to England in 1899".

Birdwood served in the Second Boer War, which began in October 1899, initially as a brigade major with a mounted brigade in Natal from 10 January 1900 and then as deputy assistant adjutant general on the staff of Major General Lord Kitchener from 15 October 1900. Promoted to brevet major on 20 November 1901 and local lieutenant colonel in October 1901, he became military secretary to Lord Kitchener on 5 June 1902, and followed him on his return to the United Kingdom on board the SS Orotava, which arrived in Southampton on 12 July 1902. He received a brevet promotion to lieutenant colonel in the South African Honours list published on 26 June 1902. In a despatch from June 1902, Lord Kitchener wrote the following about his work in South Africa:

This young officer has held a difficult position as Assistant Adjutant-General, Mounted Troops, and responsible adviser as to the distribution of remounts. In carrying out these duties he has proved himself to possess exceptional ability, and he has shown, moreover, remarkable tact in dealing with and conciliating the various interests which he had to take into consideration.

When Kitchener went to India as commander-in-chief in November 1902, Birdwood joined him there as assistant military secretary and interpreter. He was promoted to the substantive rank of major on 9 May 1903 and appointed military secretary to Lord Kitchener with the rank of full colonel on 26 June 1905. Having been appointed an aide-de-camp to the King on 14 February 1906, he was given command of the Kohat Brigade on the North West Frontier in 1908 and promoted to temporary brigadier general while serving as a colonel on the staff on 28 June 1909.

Promoted to the rank of major general on 3 October 1911, Birdwood succeeded Major General Sir Gerald Kitson as quartermaster general in India on 4 May 1912 and a member of the Viceroy's Legislative Council in 1912 and then Secretary of the Indian Army Department in 1913.

== First World War ==
=== Gallipoli ===
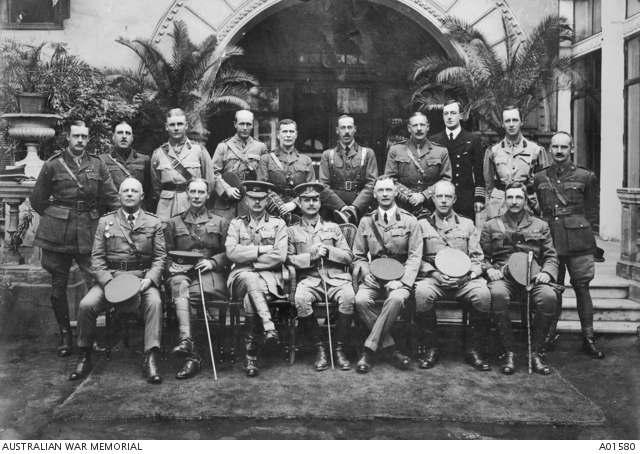
Group portrait of officers of the Australian and New Zealand Army Corps outside Shepheard's Hotel, Cairo, Egypt, March 1915. Sat in the front row in the centre is the corps commander, Lieutenant General Birdwood.

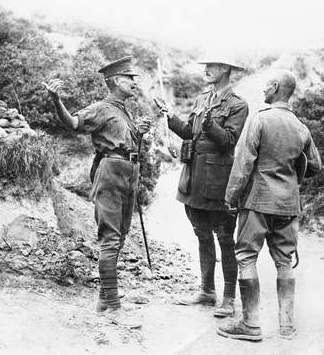
Alexander Godley (centre) confers with fellow generals Harry Chauvel (left) and William Birdwood, Gallipoli, 1915.

In November 1914 Birdwood was instructed by Kitchener to form an army corps from the Australian and New Zealand troops that were training in Egypt. He was promoted to temporary lieutenant general on 12 December 1914 and given command of the Australian and New Zealand Army Corps (ANZAC).

Lord Kitchener, by now secretary of state for war, instructed General Sir Ian Hamilton, commander-in-chief (C-in-C) of the Mediterranean Expeditionary Force (MEF), to carry out an operation to capture the Gallipoli peninsula and placed Birdwood's ANZAC Corps under Hamilton's command. Hamilton ordered Birdwood to carry out a landing on 25 April 1915 north of Kabatepe at a site now known as ANZAC Cove. The ANZAC Corps encountered high ridges, narrow gullies, dense scrub and strong Ottoman resistance and became pinned down. Major General William Bridges and Major General Alexander Godley, his divisional commanders, were both of the view that the Allied forces, dealing with stiffer-than-expected resistance, should be evacuated ahead of an expected attack by the Ottoman Army. Nevertheless, Hamilton ordered them to hold fast.

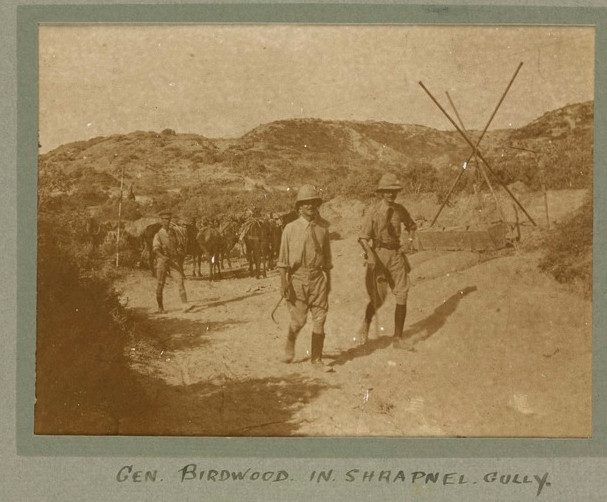
Birdwood in Shrapnel Gully, Gallipoli, sometime in 1915 MS10484/PHO1 State Library Victoria (Australia).

Birdwood took effective command of the First Australian Imperial Force in May 1915 while still commanding Allied troops on the ground at Gallipoli. He launched a major attack on Ottoman positions in August 1915 (the Battle of Sari Bair) but failed to dislodge them from the peninsula. Notwithstanding this, Birdwood was the only corps commander opposed to abandoning Gallipoli. He was promoted to the substantive rank of lieutenant general on 28 October 1915 and given command of the newly formed Dardanelles Army: the one outstanding success of the campaign was the evacuation led by Birdwood, which took place in December 1915 and January 1916, when the entire force was withdrawn before any Ottoman reaction.

=== Western Front ===
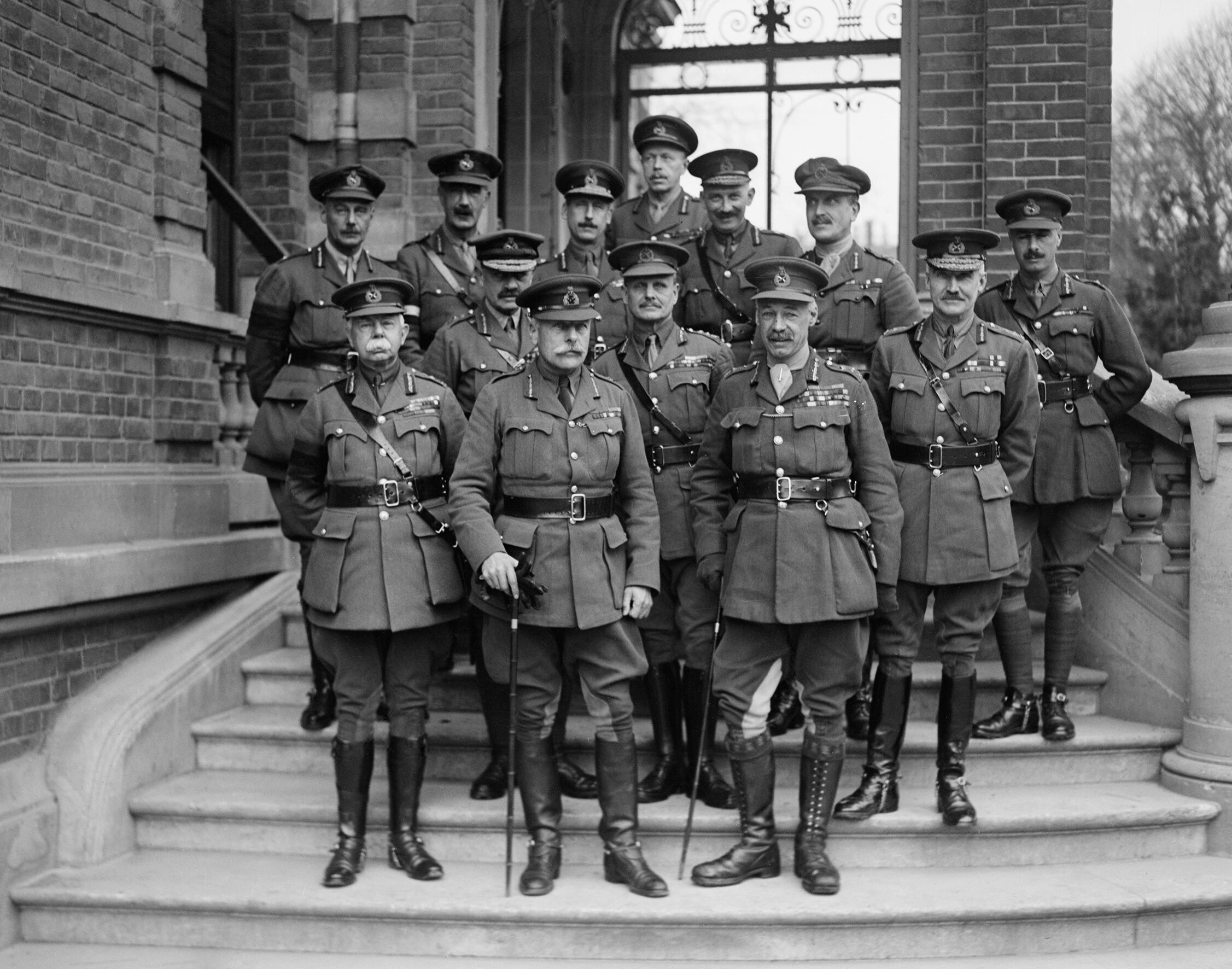
Field Marshal Sir Douglas Haig (centre front) with his senior commanders and staff officers at Cambrai, France, 11 November 1918. Stood in the centre of the second row, to Haig's left, is General Sir William Birdwood.

In February 1916 the Australian and New Zealand contingents, back in Egypt, underwent reorganisation to incorporate the new units and reinforcements that had accumulated during 1915: the Australian and New Zealand Army Corps was replaced by two corps, I ANZAC Corps and II ANZAC Corps, and Birdwood reverted to the command of II ANZAC Corps. When I ANZAC Corps became the first to depart for France, Birdwood, as senior corps commander, took over command. During early 1916 Birdwood advocated for the formation of an Australian and New Zealand Army or a Dominion Army also including Canadian forces under his command, but this did not occur.

Birdwood was promoted to the permanent rank of full general on 23 October 1917 with command of a formation then known as the Australian Corps in November 1917. He was also appointed aide-de-camp general to the King on 2 November 1917 and given command of the British Fifth Army on 31 May 1918 and led the Army at the liberation of Lille in October 1918 and at the liberation of Tournai in November 1918.

== After the war ==
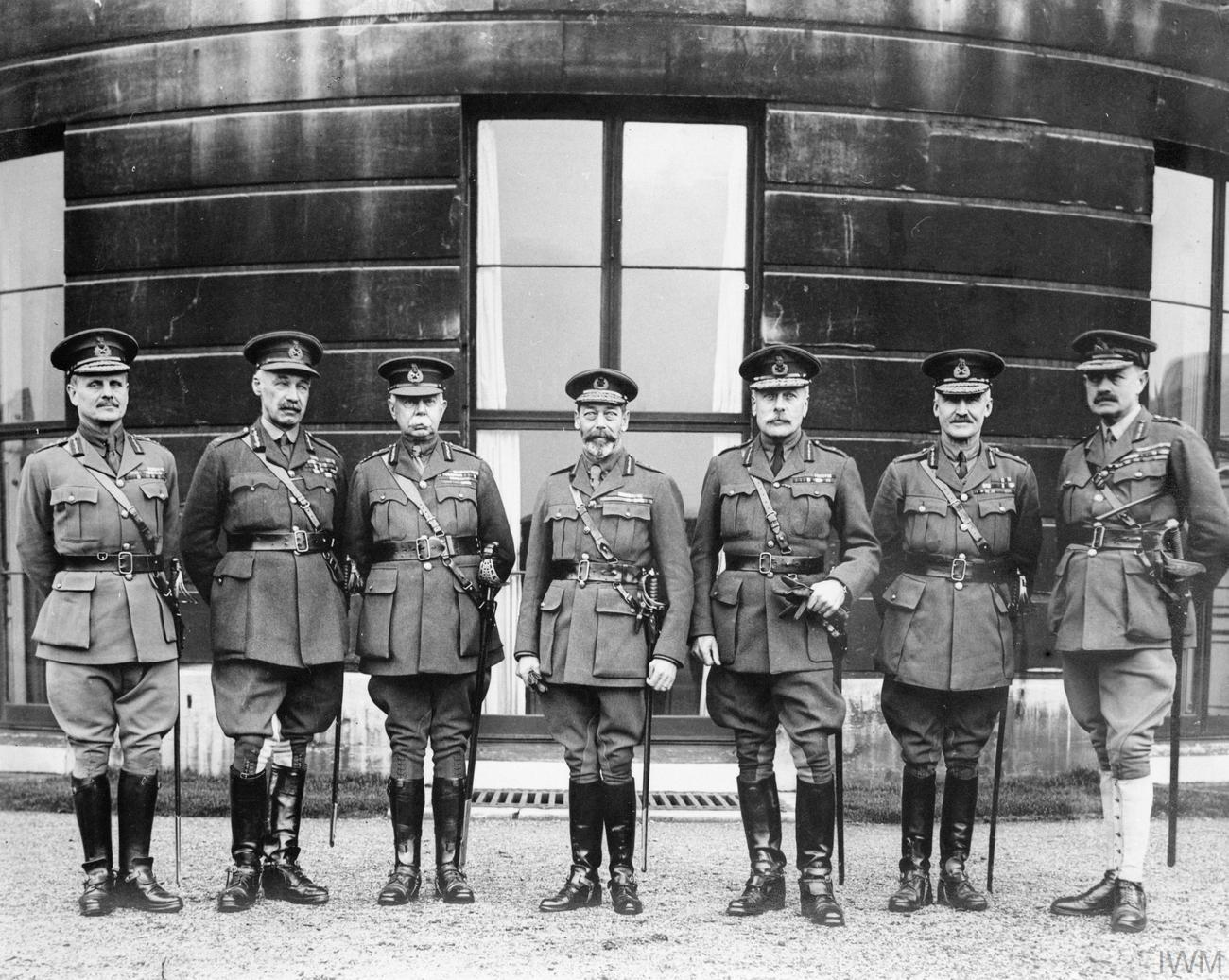
King George V (centre) with his senior commanders at Buckingham Palace, 19 December 1918. From left to right: William Birdwood, Henry Rawlinson, Herbert Plumer, George V, Douglas Haig, Henry Horne, Julian Byng.

Birdwood was made a Baronet, of Anzac and of Totnes, in the county of Devon, on 29 December 1919. He toured Australia to great acclaim in 1920 and then became general officer commanding the Northern Army in India in October of that year. He was promoted to field marshal (with the corresponding honorary rank in the Australian Military Forces) on 20 March 1925 and, having been appointed a Member of the Executive Council of the Governor-General of India in July 1925, he went on to be Commander-in-Chief, India, in August 1925.

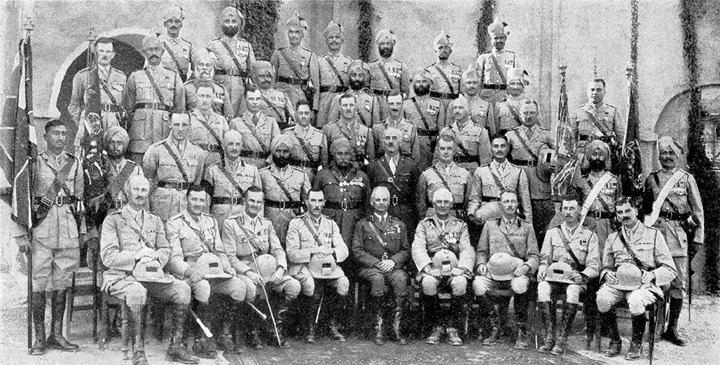
Group photograph with Field Marshal Sir William Birdwood, C-in-C in India, on occasion of colour presentation to the 2nd Battalion, 1st Punjab Regiment, Kohat, November 1931

After leaving the service in 1930, Birdwood made a bid to become Governor-General of Australia. He had the backing of the King and the British government. However, the Australian Prime Minister James Scullin insisted that his Australian nominee Sir Isaac Isaacs be appointed. Instead, Birdwood was appointed Master of Peterhouse, Cambridge on 20 April 1931 and Captain of Deal Castle in 1934. In 1935 he wrote for the Western Australian distance education magazine Our Rural Magazine, saying that he had two granddaughters making good use of distance educational courses. In May 1936, he returned to Gallipoli aboard RMS Lancastria and visited war memorials on the peninsula. He retired from academic work in 1938.

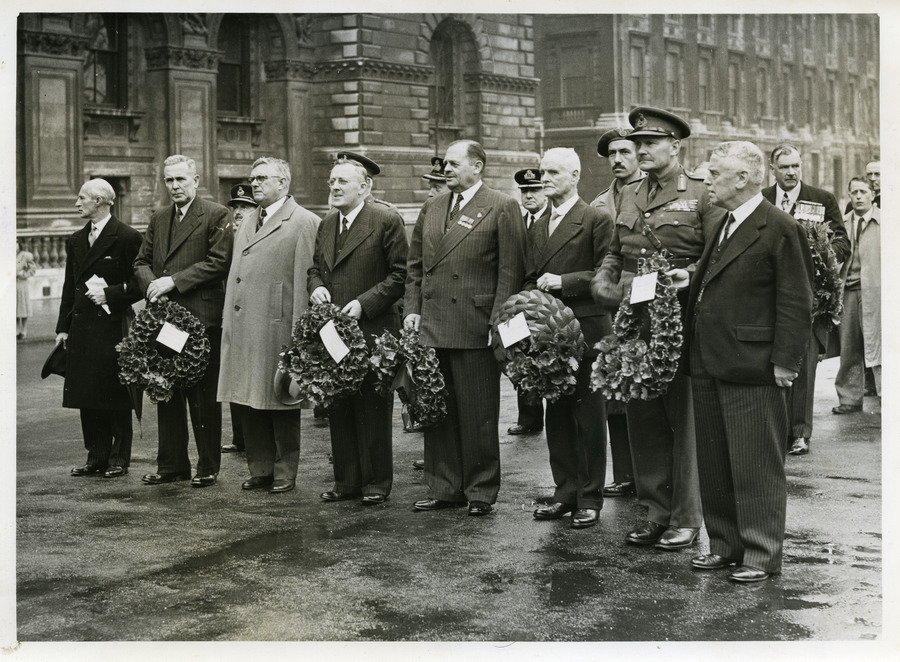
Gallipoli and Anzac Day in London, 25 April 1946. Field Marshal Birdwood stands third from the right, next to Freyberg on his left.

In retirement Birdwood was colonel of the 12th Royal Lancers (1920–1951), the 6th Gurkha Rifles (1926–1951), and the Royal Horse Guards from 1933 along with the 75th (Home Counties) (Cinque Ports) Heavy Anti-Aircraft Regiment, Royal Artillery (1939–1951). In January 1936 he attended the funeral of King George V and in May 1937 he was present for the coronation of King George VI. He was raised to the peerage as Baron Birdwood, of Anzac and of Totnes in the County of Devon, on 25 January 1938, in recognition of his wartime service.

His autobiography Khaki and Gown (1941) was followed by In my time: recollections and anecdotes (1946). Lord Birdwood died at Hampton Court Palace, where he lived in grace-and-favour apartments, on 17 May 1951, at the age of 85. He was buried at Twickenham Cemetery with full military honours; the Australian Government pays for the upkeep of his grave.

== Honours and awards ==
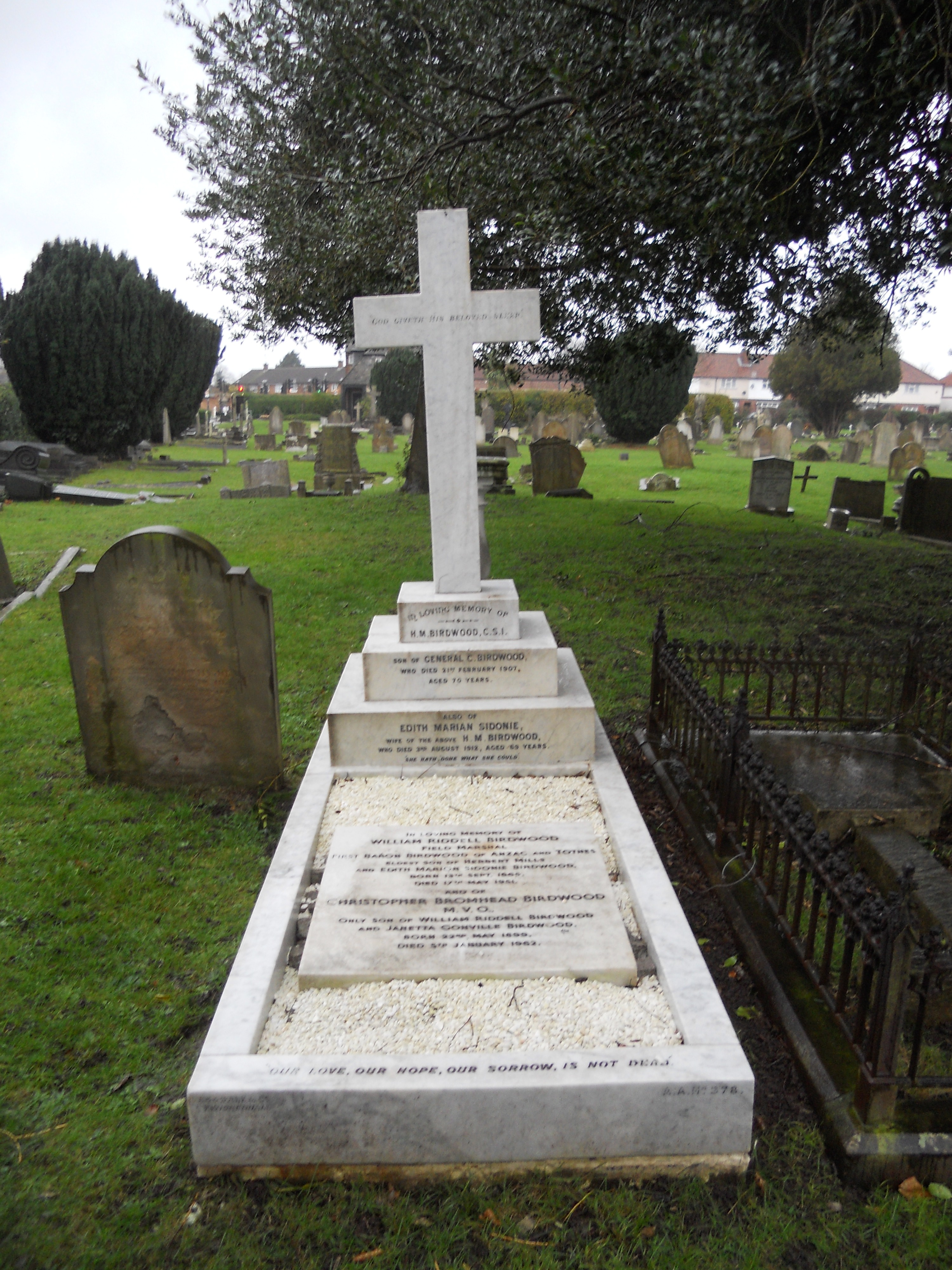
Grave of William Birdwood and family in Twickenham Cemetery

=== British ===
- Knight Grand Cross of the Order of the Bath (GCB) – 1 January 1923 (KCB: 4 June 1917; CB: 19 June 1911)
- Knight Grand Commander of the Order of the Star of India (GCSI) – 1 January 1930 (KCSI: 1 January 1915; CSI: 1 January 1910)
- Knight Grand Cross of the Order of St Michael and St George (GCMG) – 1 January 1919 (KCMG: 3 June 1915)
- Knight Grand Cross of the Royal Victorian Order (GCVO) – 11 May 1937
- Companion of the Order of the Indian Empire (CIE) – 1 January 1908
- Companion of the Distinguished Service Order (DSO) – 14 August 1908
- Knight of Grace of the Venerable Order of St. John (KStJ) – 21 June 1927

=== Foreign ===
- Croix de Guerre (France), 22 February 1916 and 11 March 1919 (with Palm)
- Grand Officer of the Order of the Crown (Belgium) – 2 November 1916
- Croix de Guerre (Belgium) – 11 March 1918
- Distinguished Service Medal (United States) – 12 July 1919
- Grand Cross of the Order of the Tower and Sword (Portugal) – 21 August 1919
- Grand Cordon of the Order of the Rising Sun (Japan) – 21 January 1921

Field Marshal Birdwood's Ribbon bar as it may have appeared in 1937 (Note: Whilst the Gallipoli Star (second from the left on the fourth row), was suppressed before the production of medals, many of the officers and men who were intended recipients of the medal had already received the ribbon bars for the award.)

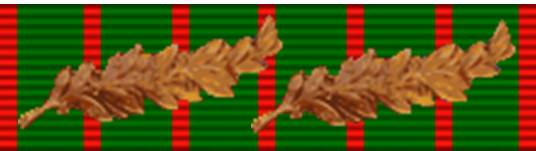

== Family ==
In 1893 Birdwood married Janetta Bromhead, daughter of Sir Benjamin Bromhead; they had a son and two daughters. His wife died in 1947. Their son, Christopher Birdwood (1899–1962), succeeded him as 2nd Baron Birdwood. The elder daughter was Constance 'Nancy' Birdwood, and the younger daughter was Judith Birdwood. Other members of the Birdwood family include Labour minister and peer Christopher Birdwood Thomson (1875–1930), Anglo-Indian naturalist Sir George Birdwood (1832–1917), and far-right political activist Jane Birdwood (1913–2000), the second wife of William Birdwood's son.

== Legacy ==
The town of Blumberg, South Australia, changed its German name to Birdwood in 1918, and the soldier settlement of Birdwoodton, Victoria, was named after Birdwood in 1920. Mount Birdwood in Alberta, Canada, also bears his name.

Birdwood House in Geraldton, Western Australia, which was built in 1935 for the Geraldton RSL and named after Birdwood, has served as the centre of ANZAC Day commemorations in Geraldton since 1936. William Birdwood visited Birdwood House in Geraldton 1937 where he was presented with a gold key and Freedom of Birdwood House. Birdwood House became Heritage Registered in 2016.

Many streets and public spaces in Australia and New Zealand are named or commonly believed to be named after Birdwood, including Birdwood Park in Newcastle West in 1920 and a street in New Lambton in 1919.

== Coat of arms ==
Coat of arms of William Birdwood
Arms of Baron Birdwood	Notes Coat of arms of the Birdwood family Coronet A coronet of a Baron Crest Out of a Mural Crown Gules a Martlet Argent between two Branches of Laurel proper Escutcheon Azure five Martlets two two and one within an Inescutcheon voided a representation of the Southern Cross all Argent Supporters Dexter: a Sergeant of the XIIth (Prince of Wales's Royal) Lancers mounted on a Bay Horse; Sinister: a Sikh Daffadar of the XIth (Prince of Wales's Own) Bengal Lancers mounted on a Chestnut Horse, both habited and accoutred proper Motto In Bello Quies (Calm in action)

== Sources ==
- Bean, C. E. W. (1921). Official History of Australia in the War of 1914–1918. Angus & Robertson. ASIN B00144LQWM.
- Beckett, Ian F. W.; Corvi, Steven J. (2006). Haig's Generals. Barnsley: Pen & Sword Military. ISBN 978-1-84415-169-1.
- Farrimond, Richmond (2023). Birdie: Field Marshal Lord Birdwood of Anzac and Totnes, 1865–1951. Warwick, UK: Helion. ISBN 978-1--804512-36-4.
- Grey, Jeffrey (2001). The Australian Army. The Australian Centenary History of Defence. Vol. I. Melbourne, Victoria: Oxford University Press. ISBN 0195541146.
- Heathcote, Tony (1999). The British Field Marshals 1736–1997. Barnsley (UK): Pen & Sword. ISBN 0-85052-696-5.
- Neillands, Robin (1999). The Great War Generals on the Western Front 1914−1918. Robinson. ISBN 1-84119-063-2.
- Tucker, Spencer; Roberts, Priscilla Mary (2005). The Encyclopedia of World War I: A Political, Social, and Military History. ABC-CLIO Ltd. ISBN 978-1851094202.

Military offices
Preceded by Sir William Bridges	General Officer Commanding; Australian Imperial Force; May 1915 – November 1919	Succeeded by Carl Jess
New command	General Officer Commanding; Australian and New Zealand Army Corps; December 1914 – February 1916	Organisation split into I Anzac Corps (Alexander Godley); II Anzac Corps (Birdwood)
New command (part of Anzac Corps)	General Officer Commanding; II ANZAC Corps; February–March 1916	Succeeded by Alexander Godley
Preceded by Alexander Godley	General Officer Commanding; I ANZAC Corps; March 1916 – May 1918	Succeeded by John Monash
Preceded by William Peyton	General Officer Commanding; British Fifth Army; May–November 1918	Post disbanded
Preceded by Sir Arthur Barrett	GOC-in-C, Northern Command, India; 1920–1924	Succeeded by Sir Claud Jacob
Honorary titles
Preceded by Walter Howorth Greenly	Colonel of the 12th Royal Lancers; 1920–1951	Succeeded by Sir Richard McCreery
Military offices
Preceded by Sir Claude Jacob	Commander-in-Chief, India; 1925–1930	Succeeded by Sir Philip Chetwode
Honorary titles
Preceded by Sir William Robertson	Colonel of the Royal Horse Guards; 1933–1951	Succeeded by Sir Richard Howard-Vyse
Peerage of the United Kingdom
New creation	Baron Birdwood; 1938–1951	Succeeded by Christopher Birdwood
Baronetage of the United Kingdom
New creation	Baronet of Anzac; 1919–1951	Succeeded by Christopher Birdwood
Academic offices
Preceded by Robert Chalmers	Master of Peterhouse, Cambridge; 1931–1938	Succeeded by Harold Temperley
