= Elizabeth Vere Drummond Ogilvie =

British baronesses

Vere, Lady Birdwood
- Born: Elizabeth Vere Drummond Ogilvie; 7 August 1909
- Died: 1 May 1997 (aged 87)
- Occupation: Baronesses

Elizabeth Vere Drummond Birdwood, Baroness Birdwood (7 August 1909 – 1 May 1997) CVO, born Elizabeth Vere Drummond Ogilvie, was research secretary of the National Association of Boys' Clubs and then secretary to the council of the King Edward VII's Hospital for Officers, London, for more than 20 years. She was born on 7 August 1909, in Goring, Oxfordshire, England, to Sir George Drummond Ogilvie and his wife Lorna Rome. On 7 March 1931, she became the first wife of Christopher Birdwood, 2nd Baron Birdwood, at Delhi, India. Mark William Ogilvie Birdwood, later 3rd Baron Birdwood, was their son.
