= Richard Harte Keatinge =

Irish soldier

Richard Keatinge
- Born: 17 June 1825; Dublin, Ireland
- Died: 25 May 1904 (aged 78); Horsham, Sussex
- Burial place: Hills Street Cemetery, Horsham
- Military career
- Allegiance: United Kingdom
- Branch: Bombay Army; British Army; British Indian Army
- Rank: Lieutenant General
- Units: Bombay Artillery; Royal Artillery; Indian Staff Corps
- Conflicts: Indian Mutiny
- Awards: Victoria Cross; Order of the Star of India
- Other work: Chief Commissioner of Ajmer-Merwara; Chief Commissioner of Assam

Lieutenant General Richard Harte Keatinge VC CSI (17 June 1825 – 25 May 1904) was an Irish recipient of the Victoria Cross, the highest and most prestigious award for gallantry in the face of the enemy that can be awarded to British and Commonwealth forces.

== Life and career ==
Keatinge was born in Dublin, the younger son of Richard Keatinge and Harriet Augusta Joseph, the third daughter of Samuel Joseph. His father was a successful barrister who served for many years as the Irish Probate judge. His mother came from a prosperous London merchant family. It was a religiously-mixed marriage, his father being a Protestant and his mother Jewish.

He was 32 years old, and a major in the Bombay Artillery, Bombay Army during the Indian Mutiny when the following deed took place on 17 March 1858 at the assault of Chundairee for which he was awarded the VC:

Bombay Artillery (now of the Staff Corps)

Major Richard Harte Keatinge Date of Act of Bravery, March 17th, 1858

For having rendered most efficient aid at the assault of Chundairee; in voluntarily leading the Column through the breach, which was protected by a heavy cross fire. He was one of the foremost to enter, and was severely wounded in the breach. The Column was saved from a serious loss that would probably have resulted, but for Major Keatinge's knowledge of the small path leading across the ditch, which had been examined during the night by himself and a servant, who declined, when required, to lead the column, without his master. Having cleared the breach; he led into the Fort where he was struck down by another dangerous wound. The Commander-in-Chief in India states that the success at Chundairee was mainly owing to this Officer, whose gallantry, really brilliant, he considers was equalled by his ability and devotion.

Major Keatinge was at the time a Political Officer with the 2nd Brigade of the Central India Field Force.

In 1862 he was transferred to the Royal Artillery and then to the Bombay Staff Corps of the British Indian Army.

In 1868, Colonel Keatinge designed Rajkumar College, Rajkot, which was formally opened in 1870. The college was founded for the education of the princely order by the princes and chiefs of Kathiawad for their sons and relations.

From 1871 to 1873 he was Chief Commissioner of Ajmer-Merwara.

He became the first Chief Commissioner of Assam in 1874, remaining in this position until 1878.

He later achieved the rank of lieutenant general.

In retirement, he settled at Horsham, Sussex, where he died in 1904. By his wife Harriet Pottinger, he had eleven children.

== Legacy ==
A road in the Indian city of Shillong, which was the capital of the British Province of Assam, where Keatinge had served as Chief Commissioner, has been named Keatinge Road in his honour.

Government offices
New title	Chief Commissioner of Ajmer-Merwara; 1871–1873	Succeeded by Sir Lewis Pelly
Preceded by Henry Hopkinson as Commissioner of Assam	Chief Commissioner of Assam; 1874–1878	Succeeded by Stewart Colvin Bayley
