= Richard Keatinge (judge) =

Irish barrister

Richard Keatinge (1793-1876) was an Irish barrister and judge who served for many years as the Irish Probate judge. He and his wife Harriet Augusta Joseph has a number of distinguished descendants, including an eminent scientist, a famous novelist and a recipient of the Victoria Cross.

== Early life ==
He was born in Dublin, son of Maurice Keatinge, barrister, and Anne Harte, daughter of Sir Richard Harte, Mayor of Limerick, and his first wife Anne Johnson. He was educated at Trinity College Dublin, which he entered in 1805, and graduated BA in 1812. He was called to the Irish Bar in 1813, King's Counsel in 1835. He was Third Serjeant-at-law (Ireland) in 1842–3, a Bencher of the King's Inns and a member of the Privy Council of Ireland.

== Career ==
In 1843 he became a judge of the Irish Prerogative Court, which dealt with probate cases, and was reconstituted as the Probate Court in 1857. He continued to sit as the Probate judge until his retirement in 1868.

He was described as a judge of the highest ability, and it was probably for this reason that in 1864, when Judge Kelly, the judge of the Irish Court of Admiralty, was forced to resign while facing serious charges of corruption, it was proposed that Keatinge replace him as Admiralty judge, while he would also continue to sit in the Probate Court. The Government was enthusiastic about the idea, but informed legal opinion in Ireland was generally against it, the objection being that Keatinge was already seriously overworked, and despite his undoubted ability, he had no experience of Admiralty work. Keatinge himself strongly opposed the proposal, citing his very heavy workload, and the plan came to nothing.

== Family and later descendants ==
He married in 1814 Harriet Augusta Joseph, the third daughter of Samuel Joseph, a London merchant. It was a mixed marriage as the Joseph family were Jewish. The eminent mathematician James Joseph Sylvester was Harriet's cousin.

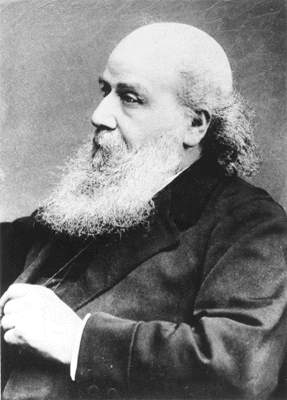
James Joseph Sylvester, Keatinge's cousin by marriage

They had at least four children, Maurice, Richard Harte Keatinge, Harriet and Laura. Maurice (1816-1896) became Chief Registrar of the Probate Court. He married Ellen-Flora Mayne (1829-1907) of Teffont Evias, Wiltshire and was the grandfather of the English soldier and Conservative Party politician Sir Edgar Keatinge (1905-1998). Richard (1825-1904) became a Lieutenant General and was awarded the Victoria Cross for his services during the Indian Mutiny. Laura (died 1874) married Sir John Henry Keane, 3rd Baronet, and had issue: her grandson was the prominent politician Sir John Keane, 5th Baronet. The younger Harriet married the Scottish geographer Coutts Trotter (1831-1906) and was the maternal grandmother of the eminent scientist J.B.S. Haldane and the writer Naomi Mitchison.

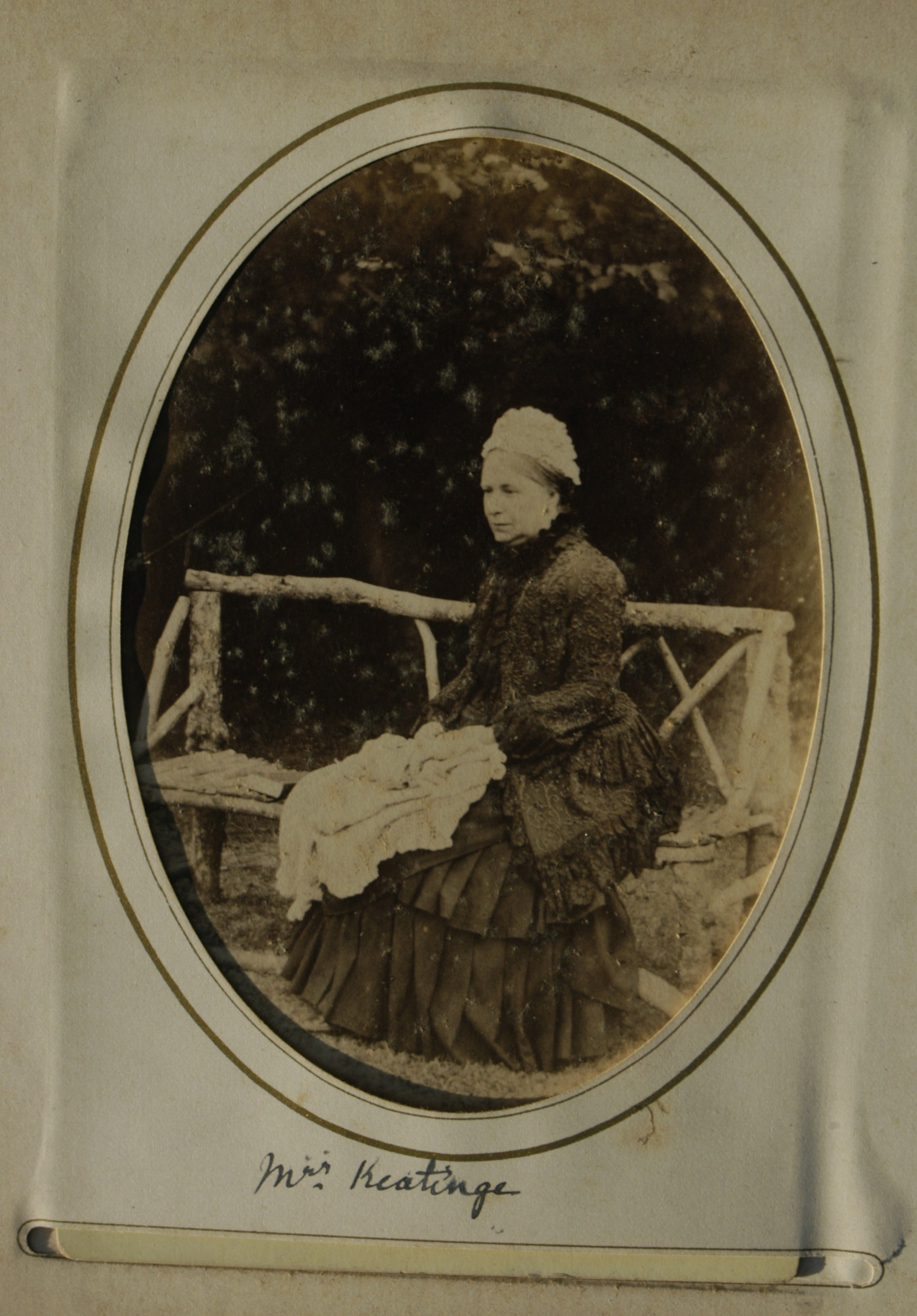
Keatinge's daughter-in-law, Ellen-Flora Mayne

== Sources ==
- Costello, Kevin The Court of Admiralty of Ireland 1575-1893 Dublin Four Courts Press 2011
- Hart, A. R. A History of the King's Serjeants-at-law in Ireland Four Courts Press 2000
- Tredoux, Gavan Comrade Haldane is Too Busy to go on Holiday- the Story of the Genius who spied for Stalin Encounter Books London New York 2018
- Walford's County Families 1860 edition
