= Robert Holland (colonial administrator) =

British colonial official (1873–1965)

Sir Robert Erskine Holland, KCIE, CSI, CVO, VD (29 June 1873 – 30 September 1965) was an administrator in British India. A member of the Indian Civil Service and of the Indian Political Service, he was Agent to the Governor-General in Rajputana and Chief Commissioner of Ajmer-Merwara from 1919 to 1925.

The son of Sir Thomas Erskine Holland, Robert Holland was educated at Winchester College and Oriel College, Oxford. He entered the Indian Civil Service in 1895.

In retirement, he was a member of the Council of India from 1925 to 1931, when he resigned at the beginning of his second five-year term. Having been called to the English bar by Lincoln's Inn in 1930, he was appointed Judicial Adviser to the Siamese Government, which carried membership of the Supreme Court of Siam. His term was not renewed in 1936, and received the Order of the Crown of Siam. He then settled in British Columbia, Canada.

== Sources ==
- "Sir Robert Holland", The Times, 9 October 1965, p. 12
- "Sir Robert Holland", Western Daily Press, 22 April 1930, p. 7
