= Mark Birdwood, 3rd Baron Birdwood =

British peer and politician (1938–2015)

The Right Honourable The Lord Birdwood

Member of the House of Lords
- Lord Temporal
- In office 6 January 1962 – 11 November 1999 as a hereditary peer
- Preceded by: The 2nd Baron Birdwood
- Succeeded by: Seat abolished (Note: Pursuant to the House of Lords Act 1999.)

Personal details
- Born: 23 November 1938
- Died: 11 July 2015 (aged 76)
- Party: Conservative
- Spouse: Judith Helen Roberts (m. 1963–1997)
- Parent(s): Christopher Birdwood, 2nd Baron Birdwood; Elizabeth Vere Drummond Ogilvie
- Education: Radley College; Trinity College, Cambridge
- Occupation: Hereditary peer, politician
- Other titles: 3rd Baronet (of Anzac and of Totnes)

Mark William Ogilvie Birdwood, 3rd Baron Birdwood (23 November 1938 – 11 July 2015), was a British Hereditary peer and politician.

== Biography ==
Birdwood was the son of Christopher Birdwood, 2nd Baron Birdwood, and Elizabeth Vere Drummond Ogilvie. He attended Radley College in Oxfordshire.

Birdwood served with the Royal Horse Guards and reached the rank of Second Lieutenant. He attended Trinity College, Cambridge, where he graduated with a Master of Arts (MA). Birdwood held leadership positions in several industrial companies. Between 1970 and 1986 he worked as director of Wrightson Wood. In 1986 he was as a business owner and president of Martlet Ltd. From 1989 to 1992 he served as Director of Scientific Generics. He was chairman of Worthington & Company from 1994 to 1998. In 2001, he was chairman of Steel Tower Ltd.

He inherited his father's title on 5 January 1962, and took his seat in the House of Lords the next day. Between 1965 and 1999 he participated several times in debates there. Until 11 November 1999, he was sitting in the upper house, then he lost his seat by the House of Lords Act 1999.

== Personal life ==
Birdwood married, on 27 April 1963, Judith Helen Roberts. They had one daughter born on 29 July 1964, Sophie Frederika Birdwood, who married the 3rd Earl of Woolton in 1987, and had three other daughters before divorcing in 1997. On the death of the 3rd Baron without male issue in 2015, the Birdwood barony and baronetcy became extinct.

== Coat of arms ==
Coat of arms of Mark Birdwood, 3rd Baron Birdwood
Arms of Baron Birdwood	Notes Coat of arms of the Birdwood family Coronet A coronet of a baron Crest Out of a Mural Crown Gules a Martlet Argent between two Branches of Laurel proper Escutcheon Azure five Martlets two two and one within an Inescutcheon voided a representation of the Southern Cross all Argent Supporters Dexter: a Sergeant of the XIIth (Prince of Wales's Royal) Lancers mounted on a Bay Horse; Sinister: a Sikh Daffadar of the XIth (Prince of Wales's Own) Bengal Lancers mounted on a Chestnut Horse, both habited and accoutred proper Motto In Bello Quies (Calm in action)

== Notes ==
Peerage of the United Kingdom
Preceded by Christopher Birdwood	Baron Birdwood; 1962–2015; Member of the House of Lords (1962–1999)	Extinct
Baronetage of the United Kingdom
Preceded by Christopher Birdwood	Birdwood baronets of Anzac and of Totnes; 1962–2015	Extinct
