= Edward Bromhead =

British landowner and mathematician (1789–1855)

Sir Edward Thomas ffrench Bromhead, 2nd Baronet FRS FRSE (26 March 1789 – 14 March 1855) was a British landowner and mathematician, best remembered as patron of the mathematician and physicist George Green and mentor of George Boole.

== Life ==
Born the son of Gonville Bromhead, 1st Baronet Bromhead (grandfather of the British second in command of the same name at Rorke's Drift) and Lady Jane ffrench, Baroness ffrench, in Dublin. Bromhead was educated at the University of Glasgow and later at Caius College, Cambridge ( B.A. 1812, M.A. 1815) before taking up the study of law at the Inner Temple in London. He was elected a Fellow of the Royal Society in 1817. Returning to Lincolnshire, he became High Steward of Lincoln. He became the 2nd Bromhead baronet, of Thurlby Hall in 1822.

While at Cambridge, Bromhead was a founder of the Analytical Society, a precursor of the Cambridge Philosophical Society, together with John Herschel, George Peacock and Charles Babbage, with whom he maintained a close and lifelong friendship. While he was, by all accounts, a gifted mathematician in his own right (although ill-health prevented him from pursuing his studies further), his greatest contribution to the subject is at second hand: having subscribed to the first publication of self-taught mathematician and physicist George Green, he encouraged Green to continue his research and to write further papers (which Bromhead sent on to be published in the Transactions of the Cambridge Philosophical Society and those of the Royal Society of Edinburgh).

Bromhead repeated his success by encouraging the young George Boole from Lincoln. Bromhead was President of the Lincoln Mechanics Institute in the Lincoln Greyfriars, where George Boole's father was the curator. Boole first came to public notice when he gave a lecture on the work of Sir Isaac Newton on 5 February 1835. The young Boole's development was fed by books that Bromhead supplied.

Bromhead lost his sight when he was old and he died unmarried at his home of Thurlby Hall in Thurlby, North Kesteven on 14 March 1855.

== Arms ==
Coat of arms of Edward Bromhead
Crest Out of a mural crown Gules a unicorn’s head Argent horned Or in the mouth a rose Gules slipped and leaved Proper. Escutcheon Azure on a bend Argent between two leopard faces Or a mural crown Gules between two fleurs-de-lis Sable. Motto Concordia Res Crescunt

== Selected publications ==
- X. Remarks on the present state of botanical classification Philosophical Magazine Series 3 Volume 11, Issue 64-65, 1837
- XXVIII. Memoranda on the origin of the botanical alliances Philosophical Magazine Series 3 Volume 11, Issue 67, 1837
- Bromhead, Edward Ffrench (1838). "An Attempt to ascertain Characters of the Botanical Alliances". Edinburgh New Philosophical Journal. 25: 123–134.

== Bibliography ==
- Edwards, A. W. F. "Bromhead, Sir Edward Thomas Ffrench". Oxford Dictionary of National Biography (online ed.). Oxford University Press. doi:10.1093/ref:odnb/37224. (Subscription, Wikipedia Library access or UK public library membership required.)
- Cannel, D. M. and Lord, N. J. (March 1993). "George Green, mathematician and physicist 1793–1841". The Mathematical Gazette. 77 (478): 26–51. doi:10.2307/3619259. JSTOR 3619259. S2CID 238490315. Mentions Bromhead's role in the career of George Green.

Baronetage of the United Kingdom
Preceded by Gonville Bromhead	Baronet (of Thurlby Hall); 1822–1855	Succeeded by Edmund Gonville Bromhead
