= Thomas Erskine Holland =

British jurist (1835–1926)

Sir Thomas Erskine Holland
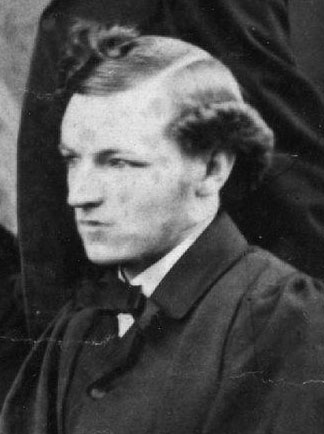
- Thomas Erskine Holland in 1860
- Born: July 17, 1835; Brighton
- Died: May 24, 1926 (aged 90); Oxford
- Occupation: Jurist

Sir Thomas Erskine Holland KC, FBA (17 July 1835 – 24 May 1926) was a British jurist.

== Biography ==
After school at Brighton College and studies at Oxford, he practiced law as a barrister from 1863 onwards. In 1874, he returned to Oxford, elected to the Vinerian Readership in English Law. Later, he became Chichele Professor of International Law and fellow of All Souls College.

His prolific scholarly work, including an often-cited treatise in legal philosophy (Elements of Jurisprudence, 1880), his co-founding and editorship of Law Quarterly Review and his service as a university judge earned him the titles of a King's Counsel and a Fellow of the British Academy, as well as a knighthood in 1917.

His son, Sir Robert Erskine Holland, was an administrator in British India.

There is a memorial tablet to him in the chapel of Brighton College.
