= Coutts Trotter (writer) =

Scottish author

Coutts Trotter (April 1831 – 5 February 1906) was a Scottish author.

The late Mr. Coutts Trotter was the eldest son of Mr. Archibald Trotter, of Dreghorn, Midlothian, and by his death, the Royal Geographical Society has lost a Fellow of thirty years' standing, and the Royal Scottish Geographical Society one of its earliest and most zealous supporters. He was born in April 1831, in Edinburgh, and was educated at Rugby and Haileybury, being destined for the service of the East India Company. Here he gave evidence of future distinction, and carried off the gold medal for political economy. But, unfortunately, he was constitutionally delicate, and was soon to find that his bad health was sufficient to debar him from any public career of usefulness. Although appointed to a post in Bengal, he got no further than Bombay, and had to return home invalided almost immediately. When sufficiently recovered he made another attempt to join his post, but with equal unsuccess; the climate was too much for him. Then he studied for a short time at Balliol College, Oxford, without any intention of entering a profession. In 1862 he married Harriet, daughter of the Right Hon. Richard Keatinge, one of the judges of the High Court of Justice in Dublin, and some years afterwards settled in Bournemouth for the benefit of his health. Here he began reviewing for the Athenæum, which he continued to do for nearly thirty years, and for the academy till it changed hands. He also contributed to the Quarterly Review and Blackwood's Magazine. In 1882 he settled in Edinburgh, and two years afterwards he helped to found the Geographical Society of Scotland for the purpose of diffusing and popularizing that important branch of knowledge in the northern kingdom. His interest in it never slackened, and he continued to attend committee meetings almost up to the end, when he was so enfeebled that he could not walk without assistance.

For the benefit of his health, he was frequently ordered abroad. In 1886 he visited Fiji, Tonga, Samoa, and Australia, thereby gaining a personal knowledge of that part of the world which made him a competent authority on geographical and other questions connected therewith. He had for some years previously taken a keen interest in such questions, especially in the island of New Guinea, the extension of British influence over which found in him a warm advocate. At the invitation of his friend the Rev. Robertson Smith, then editor of the Encyclopædia Britannica, he contributed to its ninth edition the articles on Fiji and New Guinea. He also read a paper on New Guinea at the meeting of the British Association in 1883, and a more extended account of the existing knowledge of the great island was printed in the R.G.S. Proceedings in 1884. He had carefully studied the history of discovery in this region, and served for several years on the council of the Hakluyt Society.

== Family ==
His daughter Louisa Kathleen Coutts Trotter (1863–1961) married John Scott Haldane and was the mother of J. B. S. Haldane and Naomi Mitchison.
