= George Drummond Ogilvie =

Lieutenant Colonel Sir George Drummond Ogilvie KCIE CSI
- Born: 1882
- Died: 1966 (aged 83–84)
- Children: Hon. Vere Birdwood
- Military career
- Rank: Lieutenant Colonel

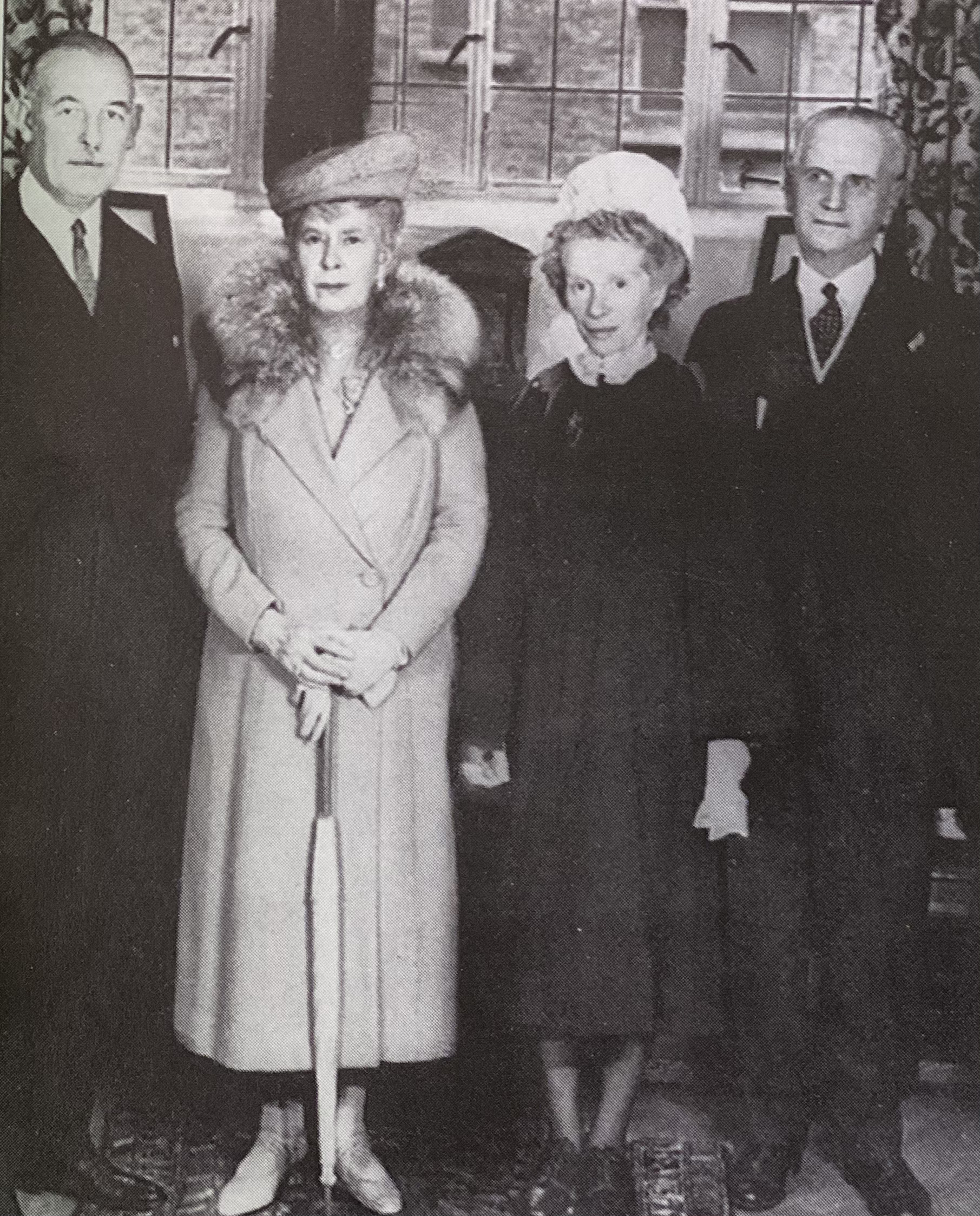
Queen Mary with Matron Saxby, Sir Harold Wernher and Sir George Ogilvie (far right). 1948

Lieutenant Colonel Sir George Drummond Ogilvie, KCIE, CSI (1882 - 1966) was a British Indian Army and Indian Political Service officer.

== Career in India ==
George Drummond Ogilvie was in the Indian Political Service. From 14 October 1932 to April 1937 he was responsible for the administration of the former province of British India, Ajmer-Merwara, as Chief Commissioner, in the capacity of agent to the Governor General in Rajputana. He was appointed Companion, Order of the Star of India (C.S.I.), and in 1936 he was knighted.

== King Edward VII's Hospital for Officers ==
In 1938, in Sister Agnes's time, he was appointed house governor to King Edward VII's Hospital for Officers, London. He supervised the hospital's move from Grosvenor Gardens to Luton Hoo on the outbreak of the Second World War, and was responsible for the purchase of the house at Beaumont Street, where the hospital now stands, having opened in 1948.

== Family ==
He married Lorna Rome, the only daughter of Thomas Rome JP of Charlton House. They had one daughter, Elizabeth Vere Drummond Ogilvie, who succeeded him on the hospital council with the title secretary.

== See also ==
- List of Chief Commissioners of Ajmer-Merwara

== Bibliography ==
- Hough, Richard (1998). Sister Agnes: The History of King Edward VII's Hospital for Officers 1899-1999. London: John Murray. ISBN 0-7195-5561-2
