= Jane Birdwood, Baroness Birdwood =

British far-right political activist

The Lady Birdwood
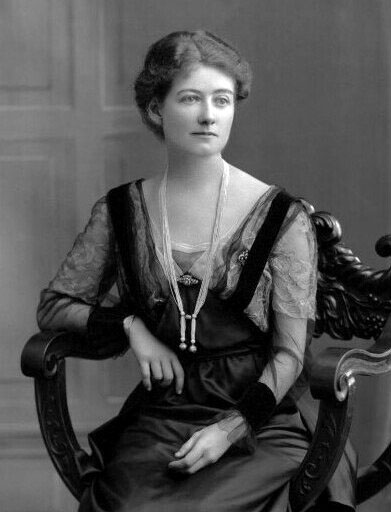
- Born: Joan Pollock Graham; 18 May 1913; Winnipeg, Manitoba, Canada
- Died: 29 June 2000 (aged 87); Hounslow, London, England
- Occupations: Political activist, publisher
- Political party: British National Party (1992)
- Other political affiliations: Monday Club (until 1973)
- Spouse: Christopher Birdwood, 2nd Baron Birdwood

Jane Birdwood, Baroness Birdwood (18 May 1913 – 29 June 2000), born Joan Pollock Graham, was a British-Canadian far-right political activist who took part in a number of movements, and was described as the "largest individual distributor of racist and antisemitic material" in Britain. She was the second wife of Christopher Birdwood, 2nd Baron Birdwood.

== Early life ==
She was born in Winnipeg, Manitoba, Canada, the daughter of a singer from Hull and a mother from Newcastle, although according to her Searchlight obituary she was the daughter of a Scottish aristocrat. The family returned to Britain when she was 10 and settled in Yorkshire.

She changed her name to Jane while working in the BBC Gramophone Library in order to avoid confusion with Joan Graham, a radio actress of the time. During the war she worked for the Entertainments National Service Association (ENSA), originally in Brussels and then in the early post-war period in Hamburg. Remaining in Germany, she joined the Red Cross in 1947, becoming secretary to Lieutenant Colonel, the Hon Christopher Birdwood.

They began an affair; she was cited as a co-respondent in Birdwood's divorce case and became his second wife after the divorce was finalised in 1954. Her husband was the son of Field Marshal William Birdwood, 1st Baron Birdwood); after his father died he succeeded to the title in 1951. In the 1950s, she was a prominent supporter of the émigré group, the Association of Ukrainians in Great Britain, dominated by supporters of the extreme right-wing Organization of Ukrainian Nationalists (OUN). Through her work with the Association of Ukrainians, she befriended Yaroslav Stetsko, an OUN leader who read out the declaration proclaiming a Ukrainian state in 1941. Stetsko had organised a pogrom in Lviv on 30 June 1941 that killed thousands of Jews and Poles. A central aspect of the OUN's ideology was the belief that nations had to stay racially "pure" to be successful, and hence the OUN made it clear that in the Ukrainian state it wished to establish there would be no minorities. In 1961, she visited South Africa, where she praised apartheid as an "inevitable and a social necessity". Strongly opposed to independence for the colonies of the British Empire, she joined the Monday Club, which represented the right wing of the Conservative Party opposed to decolonisation.

== Political activities ==
Initially serving only as a worker for her husband's passion, international aid, she expanded her political involvement after becoming a widow in 1962. She was a member of the League for European Freedom, an anti-communist group that sought to aid refugees from Eastern Europe. Her activities also brought her into contact with such groups as the Anti-Bolshevik Bloc of Nations (ABN) and individuals such as Yaroslav Stetsko. Her vehement opposition to non-white immigration to Britain was inspired by her work with the ABN. She argued that the "captive nations" of Eastern Europe had lost their independence due to "alien" elements having taken over, and that likewise allowing non-white people into Britain would ultimately erode the "Anglo-Saxon essence" of Britain, resulting in the British Communist Party taking over. She was a founding member and the General-Secretary of the League of European Freedom, which was the western European counterpart of the ABN.

In 1968, she tried to recruit Ziauddin Sardar to write for her journal New Times, saying having a young "Asian" writing for her magazine would protect her against charges of racism being made against her owing to her anti-immigration crusade. Sardar recalled her expressing much approval of Enoch Powell's "Rivers of Blood" speech, and she argued to Sardar that her anti-immigration activities were primarily directed against black immigrants. Sardar remembered her saying: "Britain is in danger of being swamped by immigrants. As most immigrants do not and cannot speak proper English, as their uncouth cultures are totally alien to the green pastures of England, as their eating and hygiene habits are so different from ours, there's bound to be strife. There will be running battles in the streets". Apparently expecting Sardar to share her anti-black prejudices and to accept her offer, she was surprised to see him erupt in fury and reject it. As she stormed out of the Sardar house with her dog, Sardar's sister shouted "And I hate your stupid dog, too!"

In addition to her anti-immigration activism she remained involved with the ABN. She was the lead speaker at a November 1969 ABN conference held in London as part of the Captive Nations Week where she called for the British government to fight to free all of the "Captive Nations" of Eastern Europe. At the end of Captive Nations Week she was the lead speaker at an ABN rally in London where she called for a moment of silence for "95 million victims" of Communism and spoke about her concern for the "Captive Nations".

Around the same time, she allied herself with campaigns to support public decency, and was briefly associated with Mary Whitehouse, becoming chairwoman of the London branch of the National Viewers' and Listeners' Association. In this role, she attempted to launch a number of prosecutions against productions and writers that offended her sense of taste, including the producers of the theatrical revue Oh! Calcutta! and actor John Bird, the author of the play Council of Love, whom she accused of blasphemy. After seeing Oh! Calcutta! on 27 July 1970 with its abundance of full frontal nudity of both sexes, she went to the police station to demand that Kenneth Tynan, the producer of Oh! Calcutta!, be charged with obscenity. Her "manic persistence and weird taste in spectacles" made her into a media favorite, who could be counted upon to say something outrageous when the press spoke to her. The Manchester Guardian called her in 1970 "the sharpest thorn in the side of the permissive society".

Lady Birdwood became involved in campaigns against trade unions, setting up the Citizens Mutual Protection Society in the early 1970s, which launched a failed attempt to run a private postal service. She took a leading role in several far-right pressure groups, including the Immigration Control Association, Common Cause, the British League of Rights (of which she was General Secretary) and Self Help, the latter attempting, unsuccessfully, to charge Arthur Scargill with sedition. She founded Self Help as an anti-union group in 1970.

She was associated with the National Front for a short period in the 1970s. In 1973, she published an article in Spearhead, the journal of the National Front, reporting "one statistic which is characteristic of many of our cities today", namely "for every 12 white children born, there are 184 coloured children born". She also worked with Ross McWhirter at this time on his magazine Majority, and became a vocal critic of the Provisional Irish Republican Army after his murder in 1975. She also devoted much time to the World Anti-Communist League. In 1974, she briefly served as president of the British chapter of the World Anti-Communist League. In 1974, the World Anti-Communist League expelled the Foreign Affairs Committee as its British chapter as too moderate, and instead took on the British League of Rights as its British chapter, whose leader was Birdwood. Despite the fact that the World Anti-Communist League had been founded in 1966 by the governments of the Republic of China (Taiwan), the chapters of the League in West tended to be dominated by white supremacist and antisemitic groups, giving the League a dubious reputation.

In 1974, she was a founding member of WISE (Welsh Irish Scots English) group led by Jason Mason, a former civil servant and Monday Club member. WISE was fiercely opposed to non-white immigration; called for the "repatriation" by force if necessary of the all non-white people from Britain; and sought to "defend" British culture which it equated with whiteness from "alien" influences. Conservative MPs, most of whom were Monday Club members, spoke at WISE's rallies, but the tendency of neo-Nazis to attend WISE's rallies caused the group to lose influence. In 1975, Phyllis Bowman, president of the Society for the Protection of Unborn Children was embarrassed when Birdwood joined in as a plaintiff in an anti-abortion legal challenge she had launched under the grounds that Britain was taking in too many immigrants and abortion was reducing the number of white infants being born. Bowman felt that having Birdwood being associated with her would reduce public sympathy. One of her major failed efforts had her calling for the UK to enforce the Edict of Expulsion against English Jews in 1290 by King Edward I, insisting the edict had never been revoked, although successive British governments had, in fact, overturned the edict, beginning with Oliver Cromwell. She accused Indians of being naturally corrupt, Chinese of being unfriendly towards her, and Sikhs of being "too tough" for Britain.

She stood in the 1983 by-election in Bermondsey as an independent candidate, winning 69 votes, and attacked her opponents by labelling the Tory candidate a "multiracialist" and the National Front candidate a "socialist". She was equally unsuccessful when she stood as a British National Party candidate in the 1992 general election in Dewsbury. Through much of her later life, she published the journal Choice, which presented a right-wing stance but was generally independent of any political party. Choice was described as a "stridently" anti-immigration magazine, which blamed all of Britain's problems on immigrants. It was observed there was a close stylistic resemblance between the pamphlets of the National Front and the articles in Choice, leading to suspicions that both were being written by the same people. In 1988, she founded the English Solidarity Against Multi-Racialism group that worked with the British National Party in its efforts to protect the "Christian way of life". The group, which was closely linked with another of Birdwood's creations, the Gentile Self-Defense League, in efforts to stop non-white and non-Christian immigration to the United Kingdom. In Britain, membership of extreme-right groups tends to overlap, and individuals are often closely identified by their choice of a journal than by their group. In the 1980s–1990s Birdwood's journal Choice was one of the more popular journals, together with Candour edited by Rosine de Bouneville. Birdwood's home was a popular meeting place for the extreme right.

In her 1991 pamphlet The Longest Hatred: An Examination of Anti-Gentilism, Birdwood wrote:

"Against the clear wishes of the indigenous British people and in a manner which can only be described as treasonable, an estimated 10 million racially unassimilable aliens have been brought into our already overcrowded island. The incomers include: West Indians, Africans, Indians, Pakistanis, Bangladeshis, Iranians, Vietnamese, Tamils, Philippinos, Arabs, Egyptians, Indonesians, Malaysians, South and Central Americans, Chinese, Greek and Turkish Cypriots, etc., not to mention vast numbers of 'nearly-Whites' from southern Europe. Now we face the prospect of further millions from Hong Kong—and Turkey, if Turkey's application to join the 'European' Common Market is successful. The hostility which these various ethnic groups bear for us, the 'host' community, is often only exceeded by the imported ancestral hatreds which they nurture for each other.
Why is this being done to our country? Because the almighty International Bankers—Rothschilds, Warburgs, Rockefellers and their associates have decided that all the peoples of the world are going to have a World Government imposed on them whether they like it or not, and breaking down the identities of the various sovereign nations is best achieved by mixing up their populations. As the pro-World Government spokesman Rabbi Abraham Feinberg put it One World—One Race: the deliberate encouragement of inter-racial marriage.
Britain has been selected by the Bankers to be their first victim nation in the context of the Common Market and other developing World Government structures. To ensure that the planned destruction of our nation is total and permanent the Bankers have determined that our unique Anglo-Saxon-Celtic people must be obliterated as a distinct ethnic group by means of forced race mixing with hordes of Blacks, Browns and Yellows who are being deliberately brought into our country for this purpose."

Later in 1991, she had been convicted of distributing antisemitic literature with the intention of stirring up racial hatred by handing out The Longest Hatred. Under the terms of her plea bargain with the Crown, she was spared prison by promising not to republish The Longest Hatred, which she violated in 1994.

In another pamphlet misleadingly titled Jewish Tributes To Our Child Martyrs, she repeated the blood libel as she claimed "Christian children were crucified, tortured and bled to death all over Europe in medieval times to satisfy Jewish religious rituals". She also accused the Talmud of sanctifying child molestation, human sacrifice and cannibalism, claiming that Jewish rituals required the sexual abuse, killing and eating of Christian children. She claimed that the Talmud was guilty of "incitements to hatred of gentiles and Christians in particular", and asked the rhetorical question: "Could these awful texts have prompted the child murders?" Finally, she claimed that Jews still engage in the killing and eating of Christian children, complaining that the attorney-general had failed to act on her complaints.

== Later activities ==
In March 1994, Birdwood was prosecuted for violating the Public Order Act 1986 by re-publishing her pamphlet The Longest Hatred, which denied the Holocaust and claimed the existence of a subversive conspiracy in Britain involving Jewish bankers. According to the prosecution, Birdwood admitted to police that she had written the foreword, edited it and was responsible for its publication and distribution. She was sentenced to three months in prison, suspended. According to Birdwood, the victims of the Holocaust died from typhoid.

Birdwood continued to lead British Solidarity as a pressure group, publish Choice, and run a publishing venture, Inter City Researchers, until late 1999, when she was forced to stand down for health reasons. After her retirement, most of these concerns passed into the hands of her associates, the former National Front co-leader Martin Webster and Peter Marriner, also a former British Movement activist. She died from cancer on 28 June 2000. In her obituary in The Guardian, her various pamphlets outlining her anti-Semitic conspiracy theories were described as "chronicles of wasted time".

== Elections contested ==
Date of election	Constituency	Party	Votes	%
24 February 1983	Bermondsey	'Independent Patriot'	69	0.2
10 April 1986	Fulham	England Demands Repatriation	226	0.6
9 April 1992	Dewsbury	British National Party	660	1.1

== Books and articles ==
- Abel, Richard (1994). Speech & respect. Stevens & Sons. ISBN 0226000567.
- Barberis, Peter; McHugh, John; Tyldesley, Mike (January 2000). Encyclopedia of British and Irish Political Organizations: Parties, Groups and Movements of the 20th Century. London: A&C Black. ISBN 0826458149.
- Fielding, Nigel (1981). The National Front. London: Routledge & Kegan. ISBN 0710005598.
- Durham, Martin (1998). Women and Fascism. London: Francis & Taylor. ISBN 1134806361.
- Holian, Anna (2011). Between National Socialism and Soviet Communism: Displaced Persons in Postwar Germany. Ann Arbor: University of Michigan Press. ISBN 978-0472117802.
- Roth, Stephen (2002). Antisemitism Worldwide, 2000/1. Lincoln: University of Nebraska Press. ISBN 080325945X.
- Rowbotham, Sheila (1997). A Century of Women: The History of Women in Britain and the United States. London: Penguin. ISBN 1844678709.
- Sarder, Ziauddin (1997). "British, Muslim, Writer". In Juliet Steyn (ed.). Other Than Identity: The Subject, Politics and Art. Manchester: Manchester University Press. pp. 63–83. ISBN 0719044634.
- Tomlinson, John (1981). Left-right: The March of Political Extremism in Britain. London: John Calder. ISBN 0714538558.
