= Arthur Lothian =

Member of the Indian Civil Service

Sir Arthur Cunningham Lothian, KCIE, CSI (1887 – 16 November 1962) was a member of the Indian Civil Service and of the Indian Political Service. He was Resident for Rajputana and Chief Commissioner of Ajmer-Merwara from 1937 to 1942 and Resident at Hyderabad from 1942 to 1946.

Educated in Aberdeen, at Christ Church, Oxford, and the University of London, Lothian joined the Indian Civil Service in 1911 and served in Bengal until 1905, when he joined the Political Department of the Government of India.
