= Thurlby, North Kesteven =

Village and civil parish in the North Kesteven district of Lincolnshire, England

Coordinates: 53.144119°N 0.644837°W

Thurlby
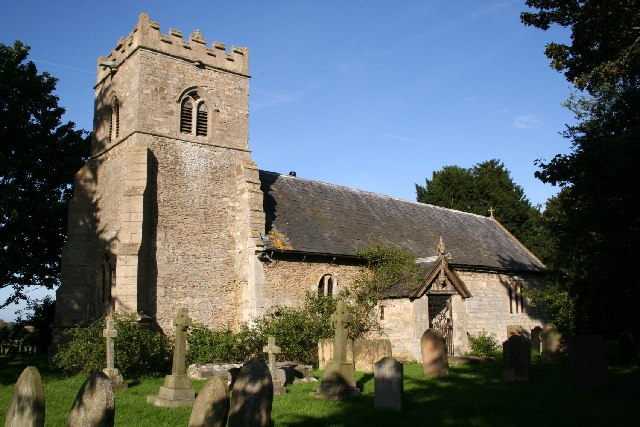
- Church of St Germain, Thurlby

- Location within Lincolnshire
- OS grid reference: SK907616
  - London: 115 mi (185 km) S
- District: North Kesteven
- Shire county: Lincolnshire
- Region: East Midlands
- Country: England
- Sovereign state: United Kingdom
- Post town: LINCOLN
- Postcode district: LN5
- Police: Lincolnshire
- Fire: Lincolnshire
- Ambulance: East Midlands
- UK Parliament: Sleaford and North Hykeham

Thurlby is a village and civil parish in the North Kesteven district of Lincolnshire, England, about 9 miles (14 km) south-west of the city of Lincoln and about 9 miles (14 km) north-east of the town of Newark-on-Trent. It is most notable for Thurlby Hall, home of the Bromhead baronets. The population is included in the civil parish of Witham St Hughs.

Thurlby is mentioned in Domesday Book – in 1086 the village consisted of 22 households.

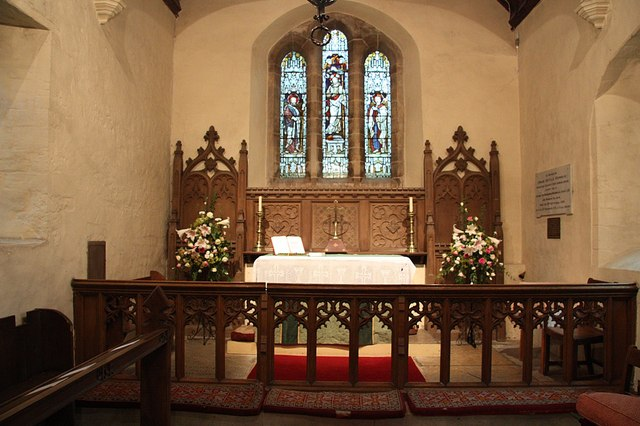
St.Germain's chancel

The parish church is a Grade II* listed building dedicated to Saint Germain and dating from the 11th century, with a 13th-century west tower. It was much restored in the 19th century, and has a porch over a Norman doorway and a 15th-century font. In the churchyard is a medieval churchyard cross which is believed to stand in its original position west of the tower. It is believed to have been restored in 1842 and is a scheduled monument.

Thurlby Hall is a Grade II listed small country house dating from the early 18th century. The house was the home of the Bromhead baronets. Major Sir Edmund Gonville Bromhead (1791–1870) 3rd Baronet, was the father of Gonville Bromhead who won the Victoria Cross at the 1879 battle of Rorke's Drift in the Zulu War. Gonville Bromhead's older brother Benjamin Parnell Bromhead succeeded their father as 4th Baronet.
