= Bromhead baronets =

Baronetcy in the Baronetage of the United Kingdom

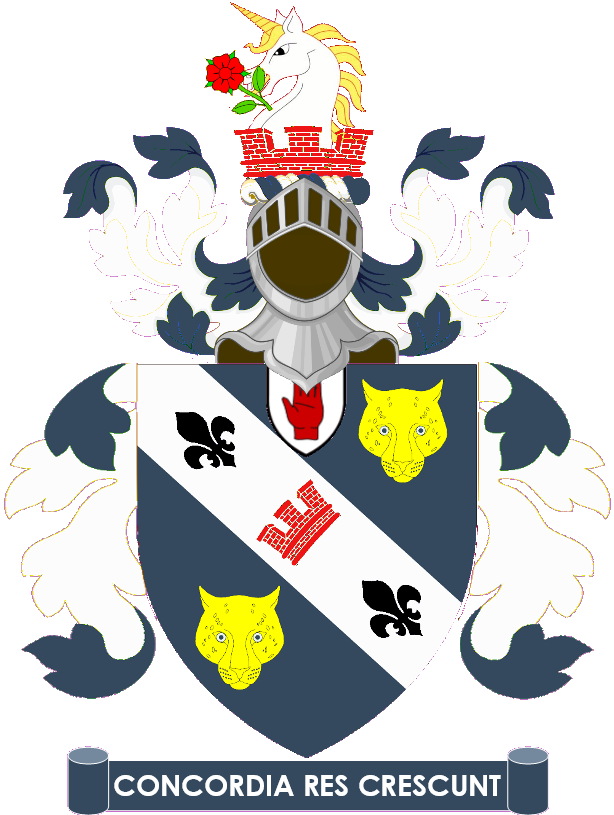
- Crest: Out of a mural crown Gules a unicorn’s head Argent horned Or in the mouth a rose Gules slipped and leaved Proper.
- Shield: Azure on a bend Argent between two leopard faces Or a mural crown Gules between two fleurs-de-lis Sable.
- Motto: Concordia Res Crescunt

The Bromhead Baronetcy, of Thurlby Hall in the County of Lincoln, is a title in the Baronetage of the United Kingdom. It was created on 19 February 1806 for the soldier Lieutenant-General Gonville Bromhead. His eldest son, the second Baronet, was a mathematician. He died unmarried and was succeeded by his younger brother, the third Baronet. He was a Major in the Army and fought at the Battle of Waterloo. His eldest son, the fourth Baronet, was a Colonel in the Indian Staff Corps. He was succeeded by his grandson, the fifth Baronet. He was a Lieutenant-Colonel in the Indian Army. As of 2007 the title is held by his son, the sixth Baronet, who succeeded in 1981. However he does not use his title.

The Victoria Cross recipient Gonville Bromhead was the youngest son of the third Baronet. The family surname is pronounced "Brumhead".

== Bromhead baronets, of Thurlby Hall (1806) ==
- Sir Gonville Bromhead, 1st Baronet (1758–1822)
- Sir Edward Francis Bromhead, 2nd Baronet (1789–1855)
- Sir Edmund de Gonville Bromhead, 3rd Baronet (1791–1870)
- Sir Benjamin Parnell Bromhead, CB, 4th Baronet (1838–1935)
- Sir Benjamin Denis Gonville Bromhead, OBE, 5th Baronet (1900–1981)
- Sir John Desmond Gonville Bromhead, 6th Baronet (born 1943). While he is recorded on the Official Roll, he does not use the title.

The heir presumptive is his first cousin John Edmund de Gonville Bromhead (born 1939), eldest son of the brother of the 5th Baronet. His heir apparent is his son Alistair John de Gonville Bromhead (born 1969).

Baronetage of the United Kingdom
Preceded by Hardy baronets	Bromhead baronets of Thurlby Hall; 19 February 1806	Succeeded by Hastings baronets
