= Gonville Bromhead =

British Army major and recipient of the Victoria Cross

Gonville Bromhead VC
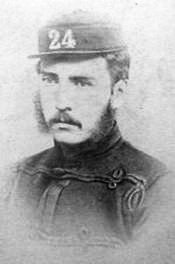
- Gonville Bromhead c.1872
- Born: 29 August 1845; Versailles, France
- Died: 9 February 1891 (aged 45); Allahabad, India, British Empire
- Military career
- Allegiance: United Kingdom / British Empire
- Branch: British Army
- Service years: 1867–1891
- Rank: Major
- Units: 24th Regiment of Foot
- Conflicts: Ninth Cape Frontier War; Anglo-Zulu War: Battle of Rorke's Drift; Third Anglo-Burmese War
- Awards: Victoria Cross

Major Gonville Bromhead (Note: The surname is pronounced "Brumhead".) VC (29 August 1845 – 9 February 1891) was a British Army officer who received the Victoria Cross (the highest award for valour in the face of the enemy that can be awarded to members of the British armed forces) for his part in the defence of Rorke's Drift in January 1879, in which a small British garrison of 139 soldiers successfully repulsed an assault by some 4,000 Zulu warriors.

Born into a notable military family, Bromhead was brought up in Thurlby, Lincolnshire. He entered the 24th Regiment of Foot as an ensign in 1867 and was promoted to lieutenant in 1871. Bromhead's battalion was deployed to southern Africa in 1878 and subsequently served in the Ninth Cape Frontier War and the Anglo-Zulu War. He spent most of the remainder of his career in south Asia, where he was promoted to major in 1883 and saw service in the Third Anglo-Burmese War. He died in 1891 in Allahabad, India, aged 45.

== Early life ==
Gonville Bromhead was born on 29 August 1845 in Versailles, France. He was the youngest child born to Maj. Sir Edmund de Gonville Bromhead, 3rd Baronet, and his wife Judith. He came from a notable military family: his great-grandfather, Boardman Bromhead, fought under Major General James Wolfe at Quebec; his grandfather, Sir Gonville Bromhead, was a lieutenant general who fought in the American Revolutionary War; his father was a veteran of the Battle of Waterloo; and his three older brothers were officers in the British Army.

His family resided at Thurlby Hall in Thurlby, Lincolnshire, and he was educated at Magnus Grammar School in Newark-on-Trent. After purchasing an ensign's commission he entered the 2nd Battalion 24th Regiment of Foot on 20 April 1867, and was promoted to lieutenant on 28 October 1871. (Note: The 24th Regiment of Foot were renamed the South Wales Borderers in July 1881.) Nicknamed "Gunny" by his colleagues, (Note: Sometimes spelled "Gonny".) Bromhead was an accomplished boxer and cricketer for the regimental team, and was popular with the men under his command. During his career he developed hearing problems which became progressively worse. However, according to historian Ian Knight, contrary to popular belief, Bromhead's deafness did not affect his ability to command his men. Nevertheless, Bromhead was not highly regarded by his commanding officer, Lieutenant Colonel Henry James Degacher, who privately described him as "hopeless".

On 1 February 1878, Bromhead's battalion was dispatched to the British Cape Colony in response to a request for reinforcements to assist in the Ninth Cape Frontier War. Arriving at East London on 9 March, Bromhead's B Company took part in several offensive operations at the conclusion of the war. During an assault on a Xhosa position in May, the company's commanding officer, Captain A.G. Godwin-Austen, was wounded by a shot accidentally fired by one of his own men. He was consequently sent back to England to recover, and command of the company temporarily passed to Bromhead. In August the battalion was sent to Pietermaritzburg, Natal, to prepare for the invasion of Zululand.

== Rorke's Drift ==
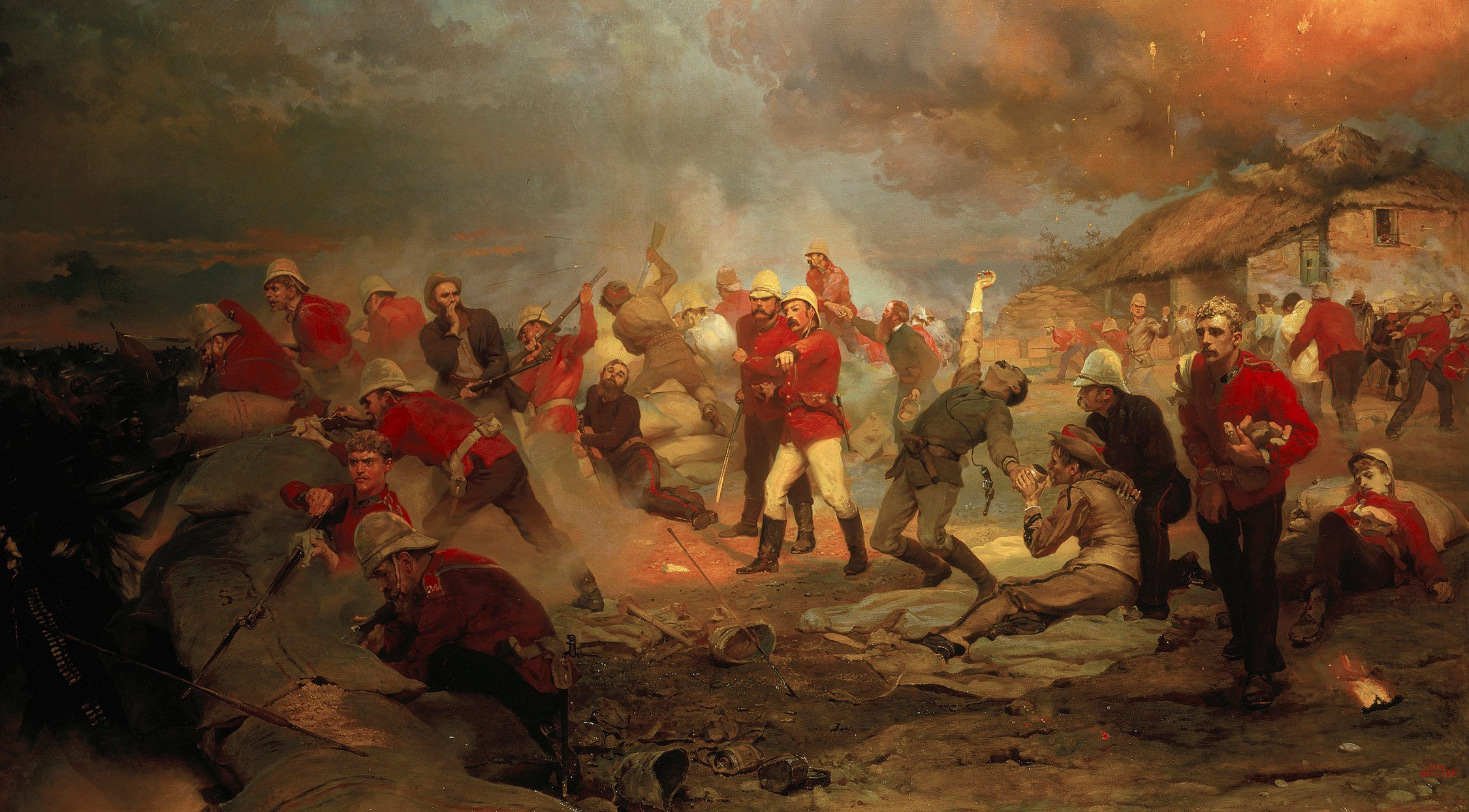
The Defence of Rorke's Drift by Elizabeth Thompson (1880). Gonville is shown in the centre directing the defence with John Chard (in the pale trousers)

At the outbreak of the Anglo-Zulu War, Bromhead's battalion was assigned to Lord Chelmsford's main invasion column which entered Zulu territory on 11 January 1879. The column crossed the border on the Buffalo River near an isolated mission station named Rorke's Drift, which was used as a staging post, and advanced 10 miles (16 km) to the east where it set up camp at Isandlwana. However, along with a large contingent of Natal Native Contingent (NNC) troops, Bromhead's company was ordered to stay behind and guard the mission station until they were replaced by a detachment from the 2nd Battalion, 4th Regiment, which was en route from the rear.

At noon on 22 January the garrison's senior officer, Major Henry Spalding (Chelmsford's quartermaster general), received news of a Zulu presence in the area, and departed from Rorke's Drift in order to ascertain the whereabouts of reinforcements due from Helpmekaar. Consequently, Lieutenant John Chard, a Royal Engineer who had been given the task of maintaining the cable ferry across the river, was left as the senior officer. At around 15:00 a small number of dishevelled horsemen appeared with news that the camp at Isandlwana had been overwhelmed by a Zulu army that was probably on its way to attack Rorke's Drift. Acting Assistant Commissary James Dalton, an experienced former sergeant in the 85th Regiment, persuaded Bromhead and Chard that the best option was to remain at the station rather than make a fighting retreat. Rorke's Drift comprised two single-storey buildings approximately 30 metres (98 ft) apart: the western building was being used as a makeshift hospital and the eastern building had been converted into a storehouse. Moving swiftly, the garrison erected a defensive perimeter between the two buildings using 200-pound (91 kg) mealie bags from the storehouse while the hospital walls were loopholed.

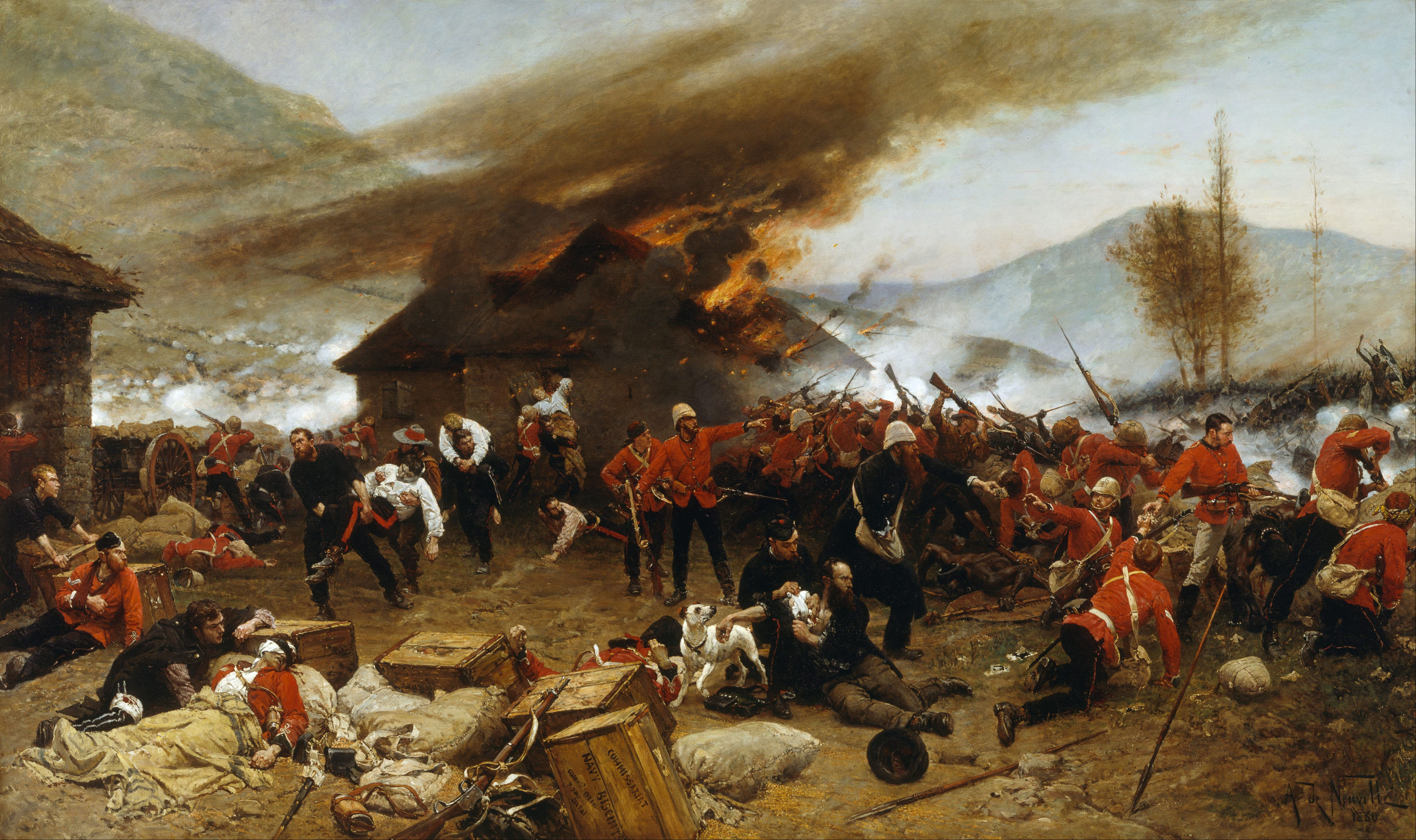
The Defence of Rorke's Drift by Alphonse-Marie-Adolphe de Neuville (1879). Bromhead is in the centre of the painting, pointing to his left.

The appearance of some 4,000 Zulu warriors approaching the station just after 16:00 caused the contingent of NNC troops to panic and flee, reducing the number of defenders to approximately 139 men. Armed primarily with assegais the Zulus charged at the garrison but were cut down by the British volley fire. Nevertheless, the Zulus pressed on with repeated charges, particularly along a weak point to the north of the hospital where Bromhead and his men became embroiled in fierce hand-to-hand combat with their opponents. At around 18:00, with the thinly manned perimeter becoming increasingly difficult to defend, Chard ordered the defenders to abandon the perimeter around the hospital and withdraw to a smaller second line of defence by the storehouse.

Bromhead took up a position alongside Private Frederick Hitch at the corner of the barricade most exposed to Zulu sniper fire, and used "his rifle and revolver with deadly aim" while encouraging his men "not to waste one round". At this point Bromhead had a near miss when, unbeknownst to him, a Zulu warrior jumped the barrier intending to spear him. However, his attacker threw himself back over the wall when Hitch presented his unloaded rifle. Hitch was later shot through the shoulder and after he was bandaged up Bromhead gave him his revolver which enabled Hitch to continue shooting with one arm. Waves of Zulu attacks continued during the night but, by the early hours of the morning, their enthusiasm for battle waned and they departed from the area. British reinforcements arrived later that morning.

=== Aftermath ===
Bromhead and the other uninjured survivors remained at Rorke's Drift for several weeks after the battle. Wary of another Zulu attack, the garrison constructed crude stone walls around the perimeter and named the fortification "Fort Bromhead". During this time Bromhead became withdrawn and lethargic, possibly experiencing psychological trauma from the battle. Major Francis Clery, who was garrisoned at Rorke's Drift with Bromhead after the battle wrote, "the height of [Bromhead's] enjoyment seemed to be to sit all day on a stone on the ground smoking a most uninviting looking pipe. The only thing that seemed equal to moving him in any way was an allusion to the defence of Rorke's Drift. This used to have a sort of electrical effect upon him, for he would jump up and off he would go, not a word could be got out of him. When I told him he should send me an official report on the affair it seemed to have a most distressing effect on him."

After news of the disastrous defeat at Isandlwana, the successful defence of Rorke's Drift was celebrated by the British press and public. As the officers in command, Chard and Bromhead were singled out for particular praise. However, some of their fellow officers resented the plaudits bestowed on the pair, believing that they merely performed their duty by defending the outpost. Chelmsford's successor, Lieutenant-General Sir Garnet Wolseley, described the praise as "monstrous". A bemused Clery remarked that "Reputations are being made and lost here in an almost comical fashion... [Bromhead is a] capital fellow at everything except soldiering" while Lieutenant Henry Curling, who was also at Rorke's Drift with Bromhead after the battle, wrote "It is very amusing to read the accounts of Chard and Bromhead... Bromhead is a stupid old fellow, as deaf as a post. Is it not curious how some men are forced into notoriety?" Nevertheless, on 2 May it was announced that as a result of the action Bromhead had been promoted to captain and brevet major, and he had been awarded the Victoria Cross, the highest decoration for gallantry that could be awarded to British troops. The citation for the award was published in the London Gazette:

THE Queen has been graciously pleased to signify Her intention to confer the decoration of the Victoria Cross on the undermentioned Officers and Soldiers of Her Majesty's Army, whose claims have been submitted for Her Majesty's approval, for their gallant conduct in the defence of Rorke's Drift, on the occasion of the attack by the Zulus, as recorded against their names, viz.:—

For their gallant conduct at the defence of Rorke's Drift, on the occasion of the attack by the Zulus on the 22nd and 23rd January, 1879.

Royal Engineers Lieutenant (now Captain and Brevet Major) J. R. M. Chard

2nd Battalion 24th Regiment Lieutenant (now Captain and Brevet Major) G. Bromhead

The Lieutenant-General commanding the troops reports that, had it not been for the fine example and excellent behaviour of these two Officers under the most trying circumstances, the defence of Rorke's Drift post would not have been conducted with that intelligence and tenacity which so essentially characterised it.

The Lieutenant-General adds, that its success must, in a great degree, be attributable to the two young Officers who exercised the Chief Command on the occasion in question.

== Later career and death ==
On Bromhead's return to England, the villagers of Thurlby presented him with an illuminated address and a revolver, and the citizens of Lincoln awarded him a sword in recognition of his services in the Zulu campaign. He and Chard were invited to dine with Queen Victoria at Balmoral, but Bromhead was fishing in Ireland and did not receive the invitation until the date had passed. The Queen did not invite him again, but instead sent him a photograph of herself. Bromhead was posted to Gibraltar in 1880, and in August was dispatched to India, where he remained until March 1881. He then returned to England, where he attended the School of Musketry, Hythe, between October and December 1882, and gained a First Class Extra Certificate. He returned to India in 1883 with his battalion, which was based at Secunderabad, and was promoted to full major on 4 April that year. From 27 October 1886 to 24 May 1888, he served in Burma, where the battalion took part in the Third Anglo-Burmese War, being used to pacify the north of the region. The battalion was subsequently posted to Allahabad, India, where Bromhead died of typhoid fever on 9 February 1891 at the age of 45. Bromhead was buried in the New Cantonment Cemetery in Allahabad.

== Legacy ==
Bromhead's Victoria Cross medal is owned by his family, and is displayed at the Regimental Museum of The Royal Welsh in Brecon in Wales.

=== In the media ===
Bromhead was portrayed by Michael Caine, in his first major film role, in the 1964 film Zulu, which depicted the defence of Rorke's Drift; Caine's Bromhead is a foppish aristocrat who fought well when the battle began. Bromhead is a main character in Peter Ho Davies's story "Relief", which appeared first in The Paris Review and was later published in Davies's 1997 collection The Ugliest House in the World. Bromhead was played by Edwin Field in a 1994 documentary on the battle.
