= Sir Gonville Bromhead, 1st Baronet =

British Army general

Lieutenant-General Sir Gonville Bromhead Bt
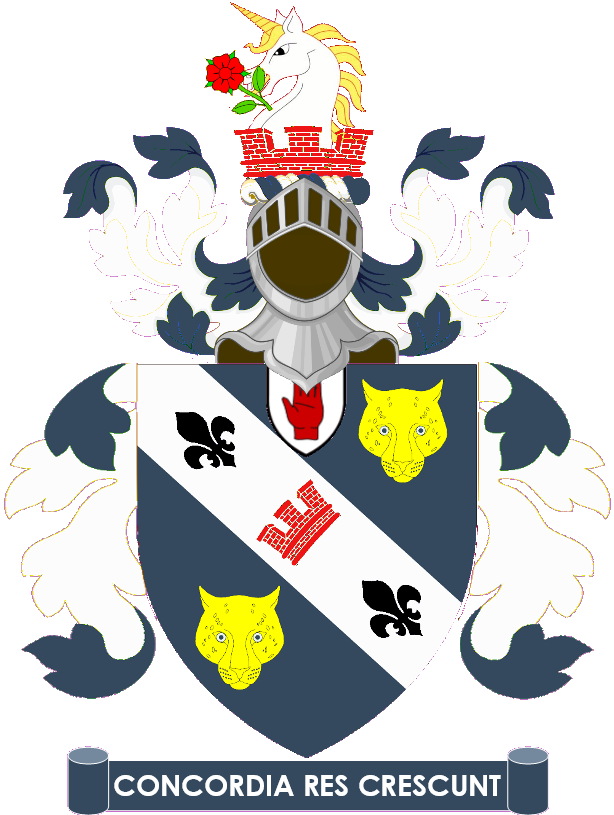
- Heraldry of the Bromhead Baronets
- Born: September 20, 1758; Lincoln, England
- Died: May 11, 1822 (aged 63)
- Education: Winchester College, and the Military Academy in Little Chelsea
- Title: 1st Baronet of Thulbry Hall
- Successor: Sir Edward Ffrench Bromhead, 2nd Baronet, and Charles ffrench Bromhead
- Spouse: Jane Ffrench
- Children: Sir Edward Ffrench Bromhead, 2nd Baronet and Sir Edmund Gonville Bromhead, 3rd Baronet
- Parents: Boardman Bromhead (father); Frances Gonville (mother)
- Family: Bromhead Baronets

Signature
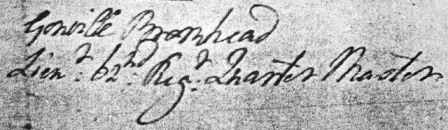

Lieutenant-General Sir Gonville Bromhead, 1st Baronet (20 September 1758 – 18 May 1822) was a British soldier who served in the Saratoga Campaign during the American Revolutionary War and fought against the Irish Rebellion of 1798.

== Early life ==
Bromhead was born in Lincoln, England, on September 30, 1758. Gonville was named after his mother, Francis Gonville. His father, Boardman Bromville was a major in the 62 Regiment of Foot. In 1770, at the age of 12, he joined the same regiment of Foot as a staff officer. He was educated at Winchester College and the Military Academy in Little Chelsea. He became an ensign at the age of 15, and a lieutenant at 17.

== American Revolution ==
At the age of 17 he joined the British forces under Sir Guy Carleton to fight in the American Revolution. Gonville fought at Trois Rivieres. During the fighting by Mount Independence, he escaped the explosion of several mines, which the enemy had left whilst evacuating the area. Bromhead also fought at the Battle of Freeman's Farm. During the battle, nearly the whole of his regiment was destroyed; himself and two privates were the only ones not killed or wounded.

Bromhead would later be injured near Fort Hardy. Around this time, he volunteered for a mission to recover lost supplies. Bromhead swam through a river under the cover of night, cut off the cables of the bateaux, causing the provisions to drift down to the British army. George III thanked Gonville for these actions. During the Battle of Saratoga, he was captured by the Americans and held as a prisoner of war for upwards of three years.

== Irish Rebellion of 1798 ==
He married Jane Ffrench on July 18, 1787. When the Irish rebellion started, he assisted his brother-in-law, Lord Ffrench, in organizing the Yeomanry Cavalry in which Bromhead served as a volunteer. Lord Carhampton, the commander-in-chief in Ireland, recommended Bromhead for a promotion. Gonville was then appointed to the lieutenant-colonelcy of the Lochaber Highlanders. This unit was stationed by the coast due to the expectation of a French attack. After a volunteer levy was raised in expectation of this potential French assault, Bromhead was appointed to the rank of brigadier-general. Later he was appointed to major-general and then lieutenant-general. Bromhead was frequently tasked with raising and disciplining new levies due to his perceived temper and firmness. He was also among the first to prohibit flogging as a punitive measure in the British military.

== Later life ==
He was created 1st Baronet Bromhead, of Thurlby Hall on February 19, 1806, due to his service in the Irish Rebellion. The Bromheads had three sons, Sir Edward Ffrench Bromhead, 2nd Baronet (born March 26, 1789), Sir Edmund Gonville Bromhead, 3rd Baronet (born January 22, 1791) and the Reverend Charles Ffrench Bromhead. He died May 11, 1822.

Baronetage of the United Kingdom
New creation	Baronet (of Thurlby Hall); 1806–1822	Succeeded by Edward Bromhead
