= Leonard Reynolds (civil servant) =

Administrator in British India

Sir Leonard William Reynolds, KCIE, CSI, MC (February 1874 – 15 May 1946) was an administrator in British India. A member of the Indian Civil Service and of the Indian Political Service, he was Agent to the Governor-General in Rajputana and Chief Commissioner of Ajmer-Merwara from 1927 to 1932.

He was appointed a Companion of the Order of the Star of India (CSI) in the 1928 Birthday Honours.

== Bibliography ==
- "Sir Leonard Reynolds, The Times, 16 May 1946, p. 7
- "Reynolds, Leonard William" . The Indian Biographical Dictionary . Vol. 19.2. 1915. p. 360.
