= Northern Cyclist Battalion =

- Active: October 1908 – 7 February 1920
- Country: United Kingdom
- Allegiance: British Crown
- Branch: British Army
- Type: Bicycle infantry
- Size: Up to three battalions
- Part of: Northern Command (peacetime)
- Garrison/HQ: Hutton Terrace, Newcastle-on-Tyne
- Service: First World War

The Northern Cyclist Battalion was a bicycle infantry battalion of the Territorial Force, part of the British Army. Formed in 1908, it served in the United Kingdom throughout the First World War and in 1920 it was converted as part of the Royal Garrison Artillery.

== History ==
=== Formation ===
The majority of the battalion was newly raised at Sunderland (later at Newcastle-on-Tyne) in October 1908 as a bicycle infantry battalion of the British Army's Territorial Force. One existing cyclist company at Sunderland transferred from the 3rd Volunteer Battalion, Durham Light Infantry. Initially designated as the 8th (Cyclist) Battalion, Northumberland Fusiliers, in 1910 the new unit was separated from that regiment and redesignated as the independent Northern Cyclist Battalion. (Note: Possibly to encourage recruitment in Northumberland and Durham. By the outbreak of the First World War it commanded four companies from each of the counties.)

In August 1914, the battalion was headquartered at the Hutton Terrace drill hall, Sandyford Road in Newcastle-on-Tyne and had the following companies:

- A Company – Sunderland
- B Company – Sunderland
- C Company – West Hartlepool
- D Company – Chester-le-Street
- E Company – Newcastle-on-Tyne
- F Company – Blyth
- G Company – Whitley Bay
- H Company – Newcastle-on-Tyne

At the outbreak of the First World War, the battalion was in Northern Command, unattached to any higher formation. It was to be used as mobile infantry, and for work on signals, scouting and similar activities.

=== First World War ===
In accordance with the Territorial and Reserve Forces Act 1907 (7 Edw. 7, c.9) which brought the Territorial Force into being, the TF was intended to be a home defence force for service during wartime and members could not be compelled to serve outside the country. However, on the outbreak of war on 4 August 1914, many members volunteered for Imperial Service. Therefore, TF units were split in August and September 1914 into 1st Line (liable for overseas service) and 2nd Line (home service for those unable or unwilling to serve overseas) units. Later, 3rd Line units were formed to act as reserves, providing trained replacements for the 1st and 2nd Lines.

==== 1/1st Northern Cyclist Battalion ====
The battalion was mobilized on 4 August 1914 at the outbreak of the First World War and moved to its war station at Morpeth. In 1915 it was transferred to the Army Cyclist Corps. By 1916 it had moved to Alnwick where it remained as part of the Tyne Garrison until the end of the war. The battalion was disembodied on 24 January 1919.

==== 2/1st Northern Cyclist Battalion ====
The 2nd Line battalion was formed in late 1914 and also remained in England throughout the war. In 1916 it was at Skegness and in June 1918 it was at Burton Constable as part of the Humber Garrison where it remained. The battalion was disbanded on 17 April 1919.

On 4 July 1915, the battalion provided personnel for the 10th Provisional Cyclist Company at Chapel St Leonards.

==== 3/1st Northern Cyclist Battalion ====
The 3rd Line battalion was formed at Newcastle in 1915 to provide trained replacements for the 1st and 2nd Line battalions. It was disbanded in March 1916 and the men were posted to 1/1st and 2/1st Battalions and to the Machine Gun Corps.

=== Post war ===
See main article 55th (Northumbrian) Medium Brigade, Royal Garrison Artillery

The Territorial Force was disbanded after the First World War, although this was a formality and it was reformed in 1920. From 1 October 1921 it was renamed as the Territorial Army.

One major change with the new Territorial Army had an effect on the number of infantry battalions. The original 14 divisions were reformed with the pre-war standard of three brigades of four battalions each, for a total of 168 battalions. Infantry were no longer to be included as Army Troops or part of the Coastal Defence Forces so the pre-war total of 208 battalions had to be reduced by 40. This was achieved by either converting certain battalions to other roles, usually artillery or engineers, or by amalgamating pairs of battalions within a regiment. In particular, based on war time experience, the Army decided to dispense with cyclists units and the existing battalions were either disbanded or converted to artillery or signals units.

The Northern Cyclist Battalion was reformed at Newcastle on 7 February 1920. Together with the former 3rd Northumbrian (County of Durham) Brigade, Royal Field Artillery it formed a medium artillery brigade (Note: The basic organic unit of the Royal Artillery was, and is, the Battery. When grouped together they formed brigades, in the same way that infantry battalions or cavalry regiments were grouped together in brigades. At the outbreak of the First World War, a field artillery brigade of headquarters (4 officers, 37 other ranks), three batteries (5 and 193 each), and a brigade ammunition column (4 and 154) had a total strength just under 800 so was broadly comparable to an infantry battalion (just over 1,000) or a cavalry regiment (about 550). Like an infantry battalion, an artillery brigade was usually commanded by a Lieutenant-Colonel. Artillery brigades were redesignated as regiments in 1938.) of the Royal Garrison Artillery as 3rd (Northumbrian) Medium Brigade, Royal Garrison Artillery, soon redesignated as 55th (Northumbrian) Medium Brigade, Royal Garrison Artillery:

- Headquarters – absorbed HQ and Ammunition Column of 3rd Northumbrian (County of Durham) Brigade, RFA
- 217th Medium Battery
- 218th Medium Battery – formed from 1st Durham Battery, RFA
- 219th Medium Battery – formed from 2nd Durham Battery, RFA
- 220th Medium Battery – formed from 1st Durham Battery, RFA

== See also ==
- Army Cyclist Corps

== Bibliography ==
- Frederick, J.B.M. (1984). Lineage Book of British Land Forces 1660–1978. Wakefield, Yorkshire: Microform Academic Publishers. ISBN 1-85117-009-X.
- James, Brigadier E.A. (1978). British Regiments 1914–18. London: Samson Books Limited. ISBN 0-906304-03-2.
- Rinaldi, Richard A (2008). Order of Battle of the British Army 1914. Ravi Rikhye. ISBN 978-0-97760728-0.
- Westlake, Ray (1986). The Territorial Battalions, A Pictorial History, 1859–1985. Tunbridge Wells: Spellmount.
