= Poor people =

Poor people or Poor People may refer to:

- People living in poverty
- Poor Folk, or Poor People, an 1846 novel by Fyodor Dostoyevsky
- Poor People, a 2007 nonfiction book by William T. Vollmann
