= Royal Northumberland Fusiliers =

5th (Northumberland) Regiment of Foot Northumberland Fusiliers Royal Northumberland Fusiliers
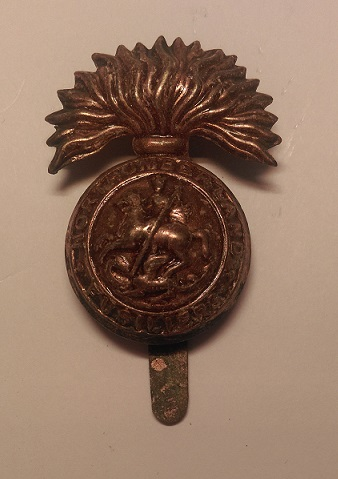
- Cap badge of the Northumberland Fusiliers.
- Active: 1674–1968
- Country: Dutch Republic (1674–1689); England (1689–1707); Great Britain (1707–1800); United Kingdom (1801–1968)
- Branch: British Army
- Type: Line infantry
- Role: Fusiliers
- Size: First World War: 52 battalions Second World War: 10 battalions
- Garrison/HQ: Fenham Barracks, Newcastle upon Tyne
- Nicknames: The Fighting 5th 5th of Foot; The Old and Bold; Wellington's Bodyguard
- Motto: Quo Fata Vocant (Whither the Fates call)
- Colors: Gosling green facings
- Anniversaries: St Georges Day 23 April

Commanders
- Notable commanders: Robert Leith-Macgregor (1st Battalion, 1960–62)

Insignia
- Hackle: Red over White

The Royal Northumberland Fusiliers was an infantry regiment of the British Army. Raised in 1674 as one of three 'English' units in the Dutch Anglo-Scots Brigade, it accompanied William III to England in the November 1688 Glorious Revolution and became part of the English establishment in 1689.

In 1751, it became the 5th Regiment of Foot, with the regional title 'Northumberland' added in 1782; in 1836, it was designated a Fusilier unit and became the 5th (Northumberland Fusiliers) Regiment of Foot.

After the 1881 Childers Reforms, it adopted the title Northumberland Fusiliers, then Royal Northumberland Fusiliers on 3 June 1935. In 1968, it was amalgamated with the Royal Fusiliers (City of London Regiment), the Royal Warwickshire Fusiliers and Lancashire Fusiliers to form the present Royal Regiment of Fusiliers.

== History ==
=== Formation to end of 17th century ===
The Battle of the Boyne, which the regiment fought in

Although briefly designated as 'Irish' when raised in January 1675, the regiment was listed as one of three "English" units in the Dutch States Army's Scots Brigade. During the 1672-1678 Franco-Dutch War, it took part in the unsuccessful siege of Maastricht and the battles of Cassel and Saint-Denis. It accompanied William III during the 1688 invasion of England, before transferring onto the English Army in 1689.

Like most regiments, until 1751, when it was designated the 5th Regiment of Foot, it was named after the current colonel. Founded by Daniel O'Brien, 3rd Viscount Clare, it began life as Viscount Clare's Regiment, then Sir John Fenwick's, followed by Patrick Westley in 1676. When transferred onto the English establishment, it was commanded by Thomas Tollemache who was replaced in May 1689 by Edward Lloyd.

Posted to Ireland for the 1689-1691 Williamite War, it fought at the Battle of the Boyne, the Second Siege of Athlone and the 1691 Siege of Limerick. Following the October 1691 Treaty of Limerick, it was sent to Flanders for the duration on the Nine Years War. Lloyd died in 1694 and replaced as Colonel by Thomas Fairfax; during the 1695 Siege of Namur, it formed part of Vaudémont's screening force. When the war ended with the 1697 Treaty of Ryswick, it avoided disbandment by being made part of the Irish garrison.

=== 18th century ===
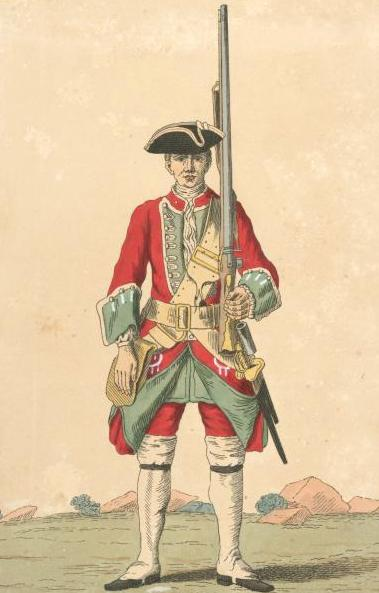
A regimental private in 1742

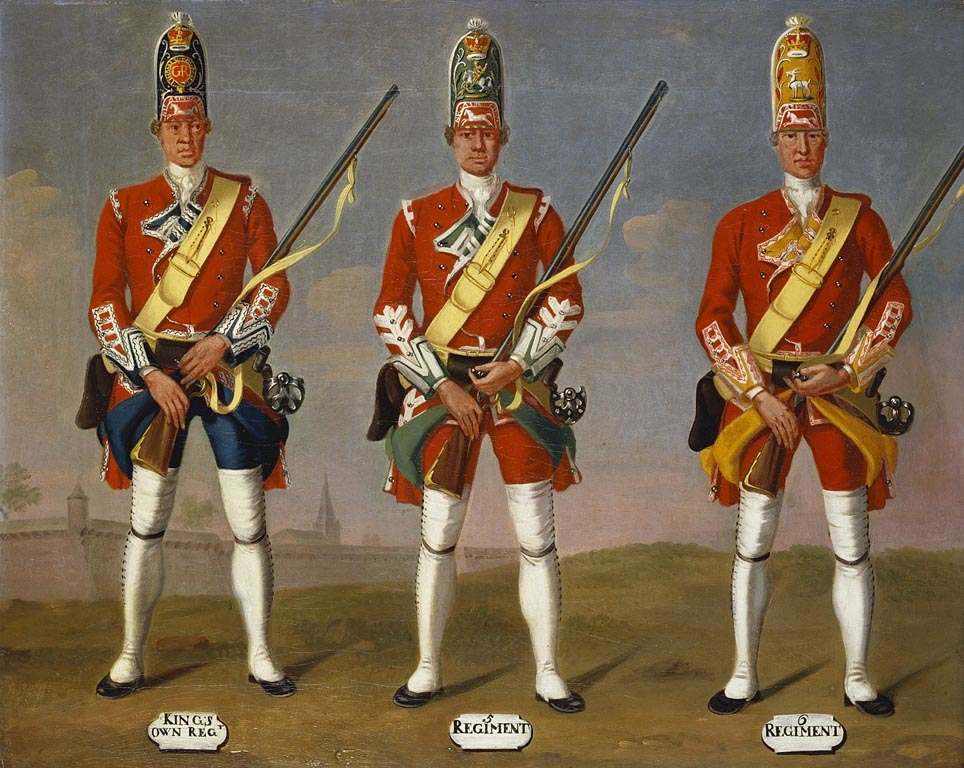
c. 1751 painting of a regimental grenadier (centre)

The regiment remained in Ireland during the first years of the War of the Spanish Succession before being sent to Portugal in 1707 as part of a British army under Henri de Massue, Earl of Galway. Its first major action was the Battle of La Gudina where the regiment took part in a rearguard action that enabled the rest of the Anglo-Portuguese army to withdraw. This ended offensive operations and when the war ended in 1713, the regiment was posted to Gibraltar, where it spent the next 15 years. It was part of the garrison during the 1727 Anglo-Spanish War, when the Spanish besieged Gibraltar for over four months. On 1 July 1751, a royal warrant provided that in future regiments would not be known by their colonels' names, but by their "number or rank" and it became the 5th Regiment of Foot.

During the Seven Years' War, it was engaged in the 1758 Raid on Cherbourg, the 1760 Battle of Warburg and Kirch Denkern in 1761, where they captured an entire French regiment. It also took part in the 1762 Battle of Wilhelmsthal, before returning to Ireland after the 1763 Treaty of Paris. Due to the increasing tensions that later resulted in the American Revolutionary War, the regiment was shipped to Boston, Massachusetts in May 1774. Elements of the unit were involved in the Battle of Lexington and Concord in April 1775 and the Battle of Bunker Hill in June.

After being evacuated to Halifax, Nova Scotia, in 1776 the 5th took part in the expedition to New York, including the battles of Long Island and White Plains, and capture of Fort Washington and Fort Lee, New Jersey. They subsequently joined Howe's 1777 campaign against Philadelphia; at Brandywine Creek, they broke the Continental Army's centre and captured five cannon. Despite this success, in 1778 the British army withdrew and the regiment was involved in fighting at Monmouth Court House.

In November 1778, they left New York for last time and were transported to the French West Indies, where on 13 December 1778, they landed on Saint Lucia. The 5th was engaged with a small force of French and captured a four-cannon battery. On 18 December 1778, a force of 9,000 French troops landed on St. Lucia. The small British force of 1,400 men occupied a hill located on the neck of a peninsula. The French were fairly raw soldiers trained to fight in the classic European style of linear battles. The French advanced on the British force several times. The British, veterans of colonial fighting, inflicted a stinging defeat on the French. The French lost 400 killed and 1100 wounded to the British losses of ten killed and 130 wounded, which included two officers from the 5th Foot.

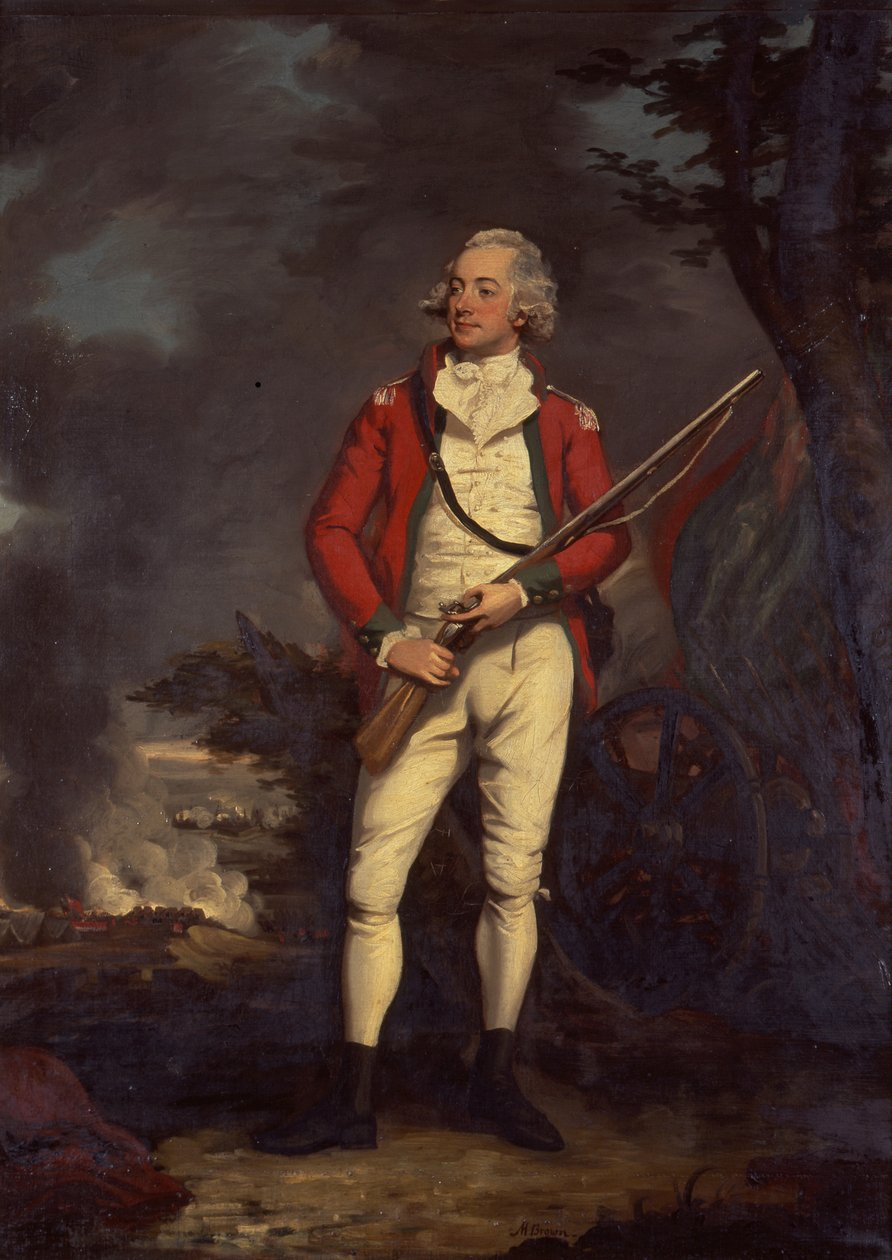
c. 1790 portrait of a regimental lieutenant

After two years in the West Indies, the 5th Foot was sent to Ireland in December 1780. They were still in Ireland when hostilities between Great Britain, France, Spain, the Netherlands, and the former Colonies officially ended in 1783. On 1 August 1782, all those regiments of the line that did not have a special title were given a county designation. The primary purpose was to improve recruiting, but no links were actually formed with the counties after which the regiments were named. The 5th became the "5th (Northumberland) Regiment of Foot": the county being chosen as a compliment to the colonel, Hugh Percy, 2nd Duke of Northumberland.

=== 19th century ===
The regiment embarked for Portugal in July 1808 for service in the Peninsular War. The regiment fought in the Battle of Roliça and the Battle of Vimeiro in August 1808, the Battle of Corunna in January 1809 and the Battle of Bussaco in September 1810. It earned the nicknames the "Old and Bold", "The Fighting Fifth" and also "Lord Wellington's Bodyguard". It formed part of a small force which beat off an overwhelming body of the enemy at El Boden in 1811, a performance which Wellington notified to the Army as a memorable example of what can be done by steadiness, discipline, and confidence. The regiment was in the 3rd Division, 2nd Brigade under command of Major General Charles Colville, consisting of the 1st/5th Regiment of Foot, 2nd/83rd Regiment of Foot, 2nd/87th Regiment of Foot and the 94th Regiment of Foot.

The regiment went on to fight at the Siege of Ciudad Rodrigo in January 1812, the Battle of Badajoz in April 1812 and the Battle of Salamanca in July 1812 as well as the Battle of Vitoria in June 1813. It then pursued the French Army into France and saw action at the Battle of Nivelle in November 1813, the Battle of Orthez in February 1814 and the Battle of Toulouse in April 1814.

The 1st Battalion served on the Canadian frontier in 1814, during the War of 1812. It then returned to Europe but arrived too late to take part in the battle of Waterloo, though it did serve in the army of occupation in France. The 2nd Battalion was disbanded on 24 June 1816.

On 4 May 1836, the 5th became a fusilier regiment and was redesignated as the 5th (Northumberland Fusiliers) Regiment of Foot:

The King has been pleased to command, that the 5th, or Northumberland, Regiment of Foot shall in future be equipped as a Fusilier Regiment, and be styled the 5th Regiment of Foot, or Northumberland Fusiliers.

The regiment, which was increased to two battalions in 1857, saw active service in the Indian Rebellion of 1857 and the Second Anglo-Afghan War in 1880.

The regiment was not fundamentally affected by the Cardwell Reforms of the 1870s, which gave it a depot at Fenham Barracks in Newcastle upon Tyne from 1873, or by the Childers reforms of 1881 – as it already possessed two battalions, there was no need for it to amalgamate with another regiment. At the same time the existing militia and rifle volunteer units of the district became battalions of the regiment. Accordingly, on 1 July 1881 the Northumberland Fusiliers was formed as the county regiment of Northumberland, (including the Counties of the towns of Newcastle upon Tyne and Berwick-upon-Tweed) with the following battalions:

Regular battalions

- 1st Battalion (formerly 1st Battalion, 5th Foot)
- 2nd Battalion (formerly 2nd Battalion, 5th Foot)

Militia battalion

- 3rd (Militia) Battalion (formerly Northumberland Light Infantry Militia)

Volunteer battalions

- 1st Northumberland (Northumberland and Berwick-on-Tweed) Rifle Volunteer Corps: renamed as 1st Volunteer Battalion in 1883
- 2nd Northumberland Rifle Volunteer Corps: renamed as 2nd Volunteer Battalion in 1883
- 1st Newcastle upon Tyne Rifle Volunteer Corps: renamed as 3rd Volunteer Battalion in 1883

=== The Second Boer War ===
In October 1899 war broke out between the United Kingdom and the Boer Republics in what is now South Africa. The 1st Battalion formed part of the 9th Brigade together with the 2nd Northamptonshire Regiment, 2nd Yorkshire Light Infantry, and part of the 1st Loyal North Lancashire Regiment. While the 2nd Battalion sailed as corps troops, and was then brigaded with the 1st Royal Scots, and 1st Sherwood Foresters, under General Sir William Gatacre. The battalions fought in the following battles: Battle of Belmont, Battle of Graspan, Battle of Modder River, Battle of Magersfontein, Battle of Stormberg, Battle of Reddersberg, Battle of Sanna's Post and the Battle of Nooitgedacht. The war ended with the Treaty of Vereeniging in June 1902, and the 2nd Battalion stayed in South Africa until January 1903, when 357 officers and men left Cape Town for home on theSS Aurania.

=== Reorganisations 1900–1908 ===
With the continuation of the war in South Africa, a number of regiments containing large centres of population formed additional regular battalions. The Northumberland Fusiliers formed 3rd and 4th regular Battalions in February 1900, when the militia battalion was relabeled as the 5th battalion. The 3rd was stationed in South Africa, and in 1902 some of the men were in Antigua to guard the Boer prisoners of war placed there. The 4th formed part of the garrison in Ireland. Both were disbanded in 1907.

The 5th (militia) battalion (known as the 3rd battalion until February 1900) was embodied in December 1899, and from February 1900 to July 1901 was stationed at Malta.

In 1908 a reorganisation of reserve forces was carried out under the Territorial and Reserve Forces Act 1907. The militia were transferred to a new "Special Reserve" while the Volunteer Force was reorganised to become the Territorial Force. The "Volunteer Battalion" designation was discarded, and territorial battalions were numbered on after those of the regular army and special reserve. The new organisation was thus:

- 1st Battalion
- 2nd Battalion
- 3rd Battalion (Special Reserve)
- 4th Battalion (T.F.) (HQ at Hencotes in Hexham, from bulk of 1st Volunteer Battalion)
- 5th Battalion (T.F.) (HQ at Church Street in Walker (since demolished), redesignation of 2nd Volunteer Battalion)
- 6th (City) Battalion (T.F.) (HQ at Northumberland Road in Newcastle, redesignation of 3rd Volunteer Battalion)
- 7th Battalion (T.F.) (HQ at Fenkle Street in Alnwick, from part of 1st Volunteer Battalion)
- 8th (Cyclist) Battalion (HQ at Hutton Terrace in Newcastle, formed 1908, redesignated Northern Cyclist Battalion in 1910 and transferred to the Army Cyclist Corps in 1915)

=== First World War ===
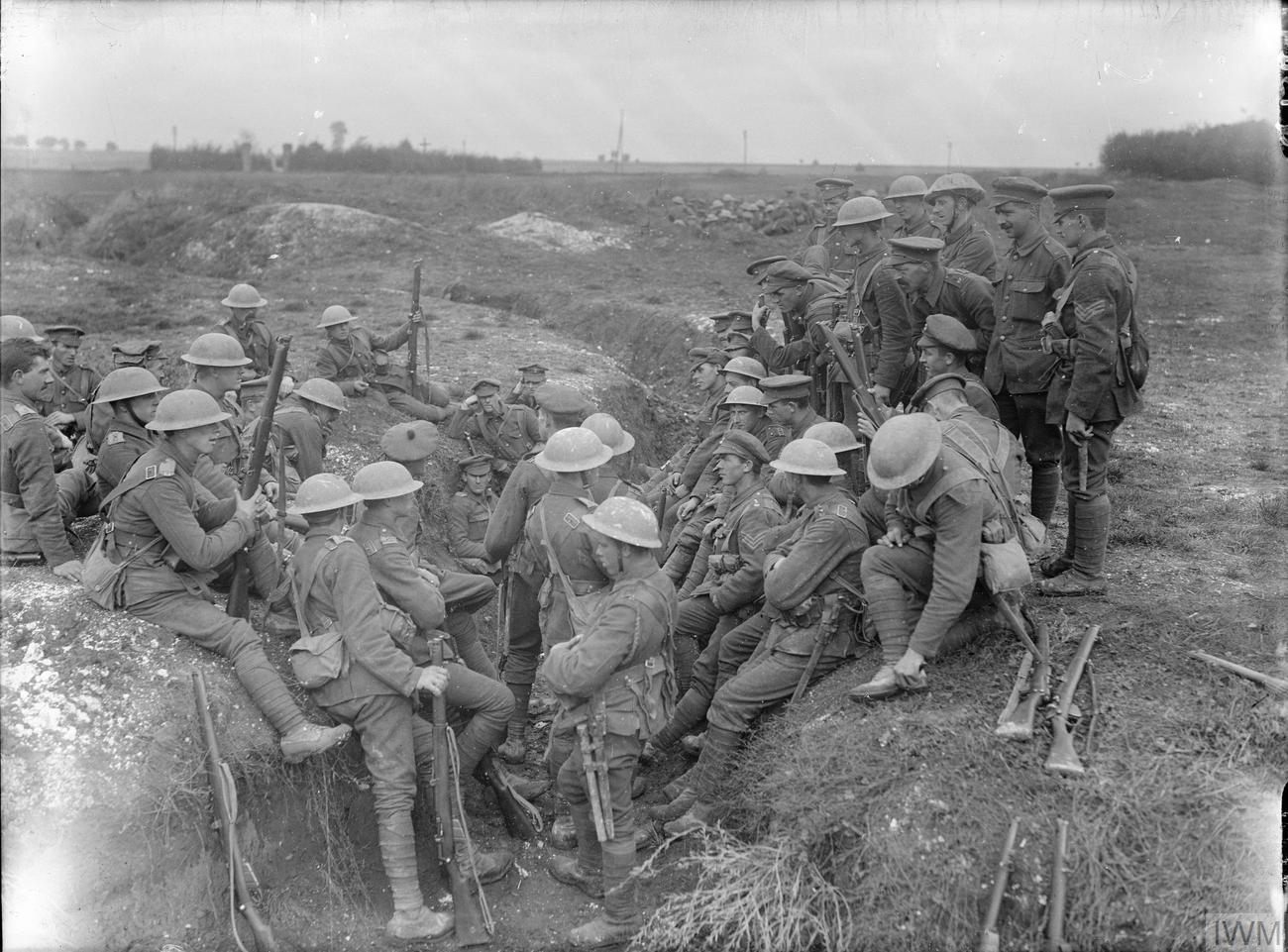
Northumberland Fusiliers in a reserve trench at Thiepval, France, September 1916.

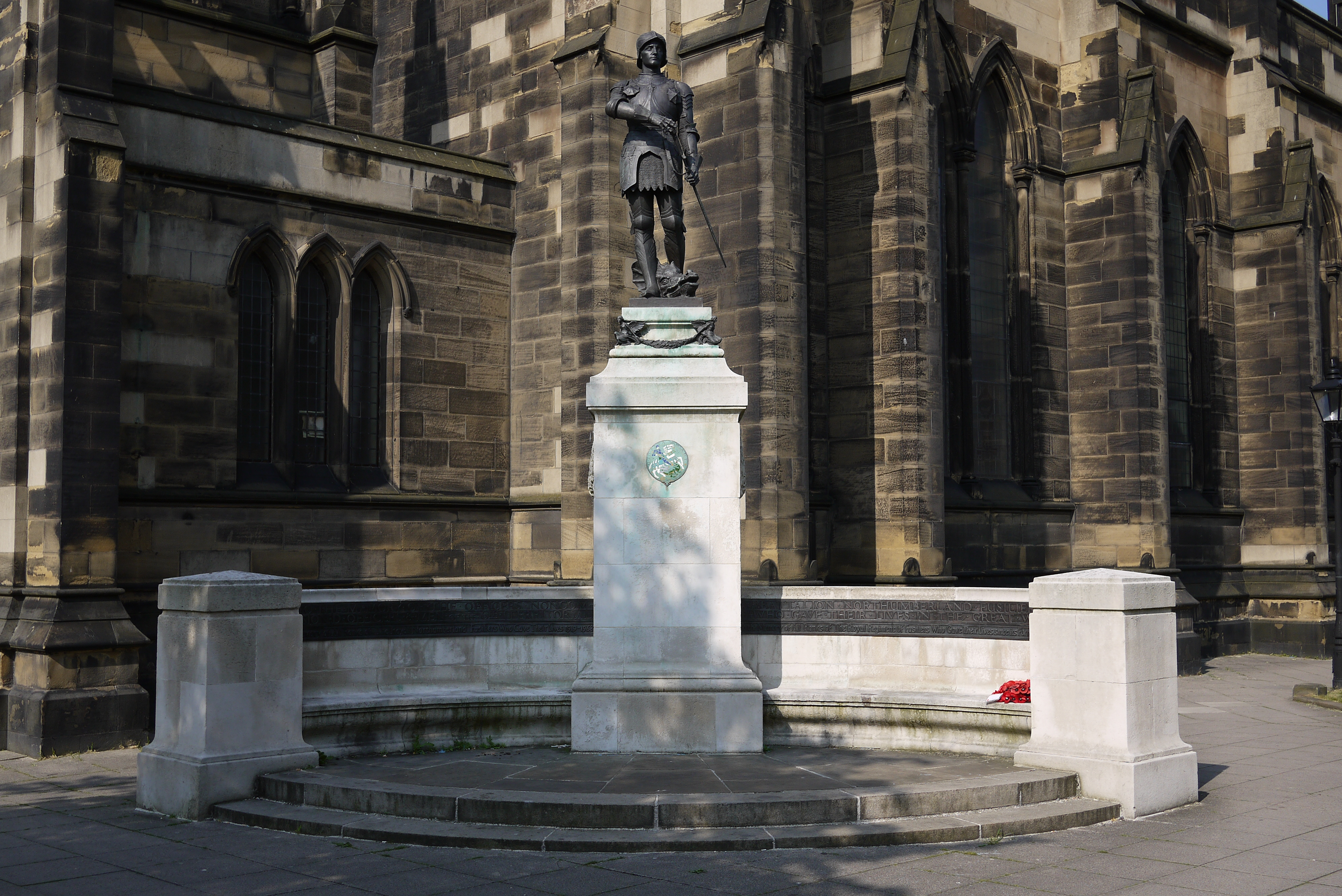
Memorial to the 6th (TF) Battalion, Northumberland Fusiliers, in Newcastle upon Tyne.

During the First World War, the Northumberland Fusiliers expanded to 52 battalions and 29 of them served overseas. (Note: Battalions that served overseas during the war were the 1st and 2nd (Regular), 1/4th, 1/5th, 1/6th, 1/7th, 2/7th (Territorial), 8th, 9th, 10th, 11th, 12th, 13th, 14th, 16th, 17th, 18th, 19th (Service), 20th, 21st, 22nd, 23rd (Service, 1st – 4th Tyneside Scottish), 24th, 25th, 26th, 27th (Service, 1st – 4th Tyneside Irish), 36th (Territorial), 1st Garrison and 2nd Garrison.) It was the second largest infantry regiment of the British Army during the war, surpassed only by the 88 battalions of the London Regiment.

The increase in strength was done partly by forming duplicates of existing Territorial Force (TF) battalions, and partly by the creation of new "Service" battalions. An example of the first instance was the 4th Battalion which was renumbered as the 1/4th in August 1914 on forming a duplicate 2/4th Battalion. A 3/4th Battalion followed in June 1915.

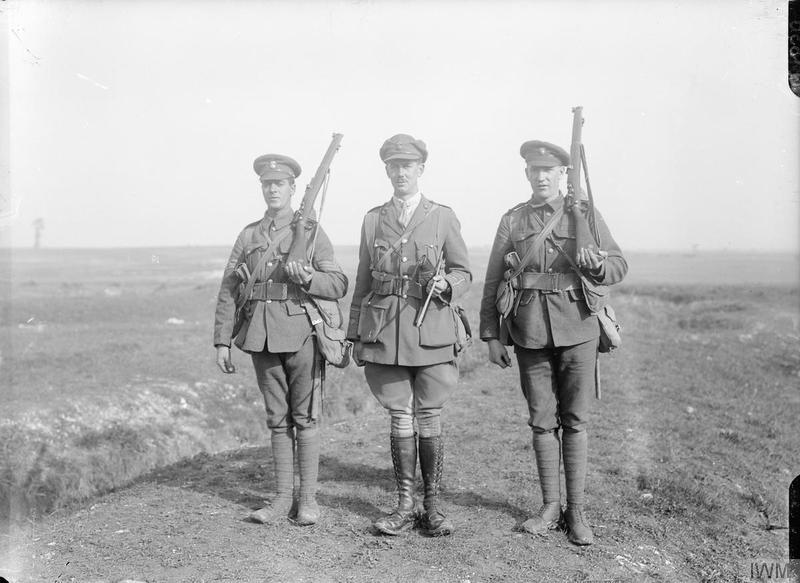
An officer, sergeant and private soldier of the Northumberland Fusiliers, 149th (Northumbrian) Brigade, 50th (Northumbrian) Division, near Millencourt, France, October 1916.

Among the Service battalions were the Tyneside Scottish (20th - 23rd Battalions) and the Tyneside Irish (24th - 27th Battalions), while the 17th (Service) Battalion was formed by staff of the North Eastern Railway, and was involved in railway construction.

They earned 67 battle honours and won five Victoria Crosses, but at the cost of over 16,000 dead. The battalions mostly saw action on the Western Front, but also in Macedonia, Gallipoli, Egypt and Italy.

=== Between the wars ===
In June 1935 King George V celebrated his silver jubilee. This opportunity was taken of granting royal status to four regiments, principally in recognition of their service in the previous war:

On the occasion of His Majesty's Birthday and in commemoration of the completion of the twenty-fifth year of his reign, the King has been graciously pleased... to approve that the following regiments shall in future enjoy the distinction "Royal" and shall henceforth be designated:—

- 5th Royal Inniskilling Dragoon Guards
- The Buffs (Royal East Kent Regiment)
- The Royal Northumberland Fusiliers
- The Royal Norfolk Regiment

In 1936, the Royal Northumberland Fusiliers was one of four line infantry regiments selected for conversion to specialised Divisional (Machine Gun) or Divisional (Support) Battalions. The other regiments selected were the Cheshire Regiment, the Manchester Regiment and the Middlesex Regiment.

=== Second World War ===
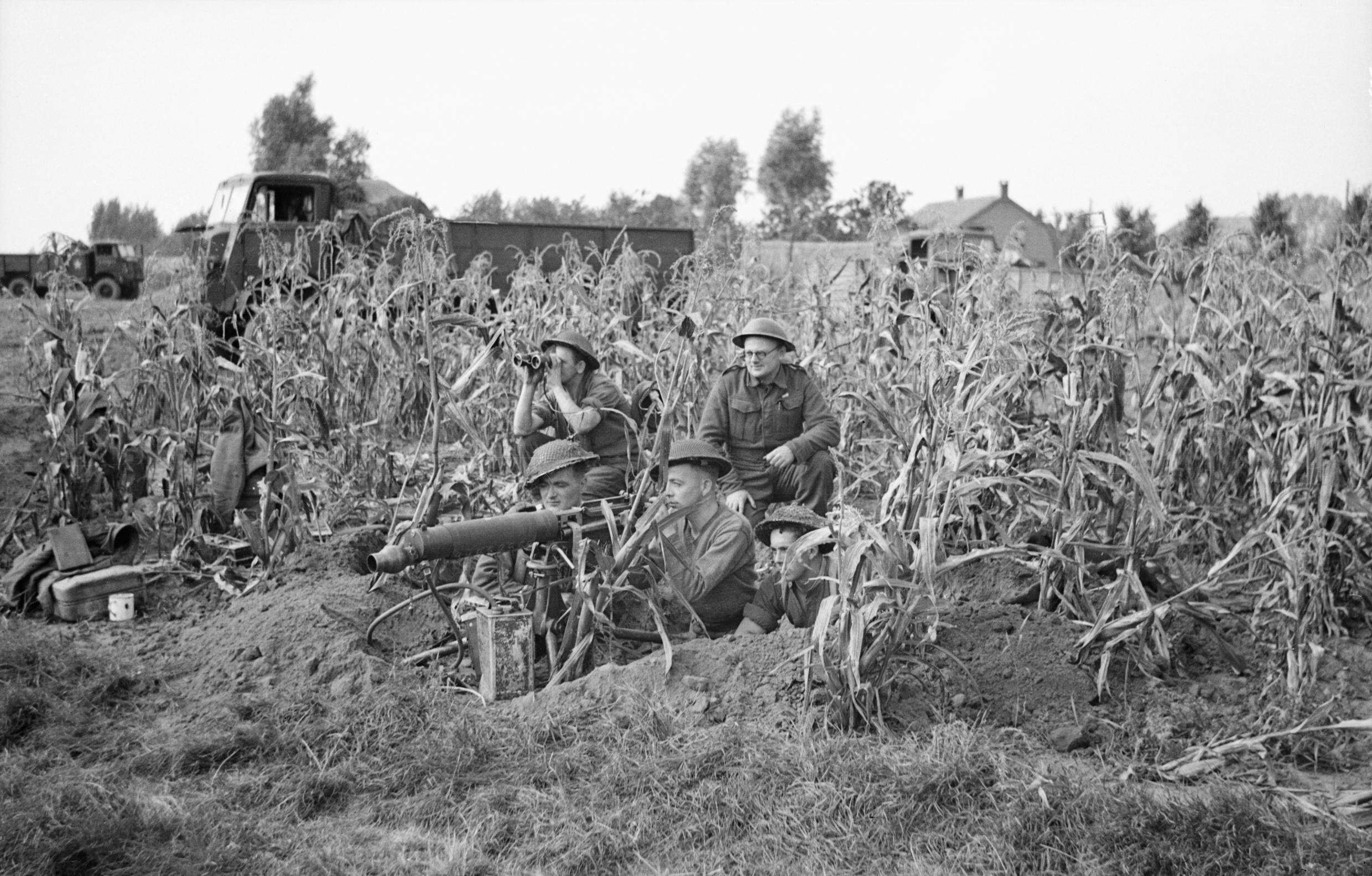
A Vickers machine-gun team of 7th Royal Northumberland Fusiliers, 59th (Staffordshire) Division in position in a field of corn at Someren in the Netherlands, 21 September 1944.

The regiment expanded to ten battalions during the Second World War. Although most of them served as divisional machine gun (Note: Divisional machine gun battalions were originally organized into four companies, each of three platoons of four Vickers machine guns (so 12 per company, 48 per battalion). From 1943, one of the MG companies was replaced by a mortar company (16 4.2" mortars in four platoons).) or support (Note: Divisional support battalions had a more brigade-centric organization: three groups (one per divisional brigade) each with an MG company (three platoons of four Vickers each), an AA company (four platoons of four 20mm Polsten or Hispano-Suiza light AA guns each) and a mortar company (two platoons of four 4.2" mortars each).) battalions, some of them formed motorcycle, searchlight, tank, reconnaissance, ordinary infantry and even deception units. They saw action with the BEF in North-West Europe in 1940 and the 21st Army Group in 1944–45, North Africa 1940–43, Italy 1943–45, the fall of Singapore and the defence of the United Kingdom.

=== Korean War ===
The 1st Battalion was attached to the 29th Independent Infantry Brigade, which had been sent to Korea to reinforce the Allied effort there. When it arrived in Korea in December 1950, the Brigade comprised:

- 1st Battalion, the Royal Northumberland Fusiliers
- 1st Battalion, the Gloucestershire Regiment
- 1st Battalion, the Royal Ulster Rifles
- 8th King's Royal Irish Hussars
- C Squadron, 7th Royal Tank Regiment, with specialised armour
- 45 Field Regiment RA
- 11 LAA Battery RA
- 170 Mortar Battery RA
- plus supporting units.

In April 1951 the battalion was involved in the Battle of the Imjin River, as the brigade stood in the path of the Chinese Spring Offensive. In July 1951, it was re-organized as 29th British Infantry Brigade and absorbed into the 1st Commonwealth Division.

== Regimental museum ==
The Fusiliers Museum of Northumberland is based in Alnwick Castle.

== Badges and dress distinctions ==
The 5th Regiment of Foot was one of the 'Six Old Corps' entitled to use their 'ancient badge' (St George killing the Dragon) on Regimental Colours, drums and other devices rather than the typical GR cipher as used by normal Regiments of the Line, a distinction first officially recorded in 1747.

In the centre of their colours was an image of St. George killing the dragon, this being their ancient badge, and in the three corners of their second colour, the rose and crown.

The regiment wore a distinctively-coloured hackle or plume on the fusilier cap and later on the beret. The hackle was red over white, and was authorised in June 1829. This replaced the white feather plume the regiment had adopted following the Battle of St Lucia in 1778, supposedly taken from the headgear of fallen French troops. The 5th Foot was the only line regiment, since the introduction of the shako in 1800, to wear the white plume (other regiments having white over red) although the right to wear it was only officially granted in 1824. In 1829 a new model of shako was introduced and all infantry regiments were to wear a white plume, with the 5th Foot given a unique plume of red over white. This became a red over white 'ball tuft' in 1835 and later became a hackle in the same colours.

== Victoria Cross ==
The following members of the regiment were recipients of the Victoria Cross.

- James Bulmer Johnson
- Patrick McHale
- Peter McManus
- Ernest Sykes
- Thomas Bryan
- Robert Henry Cain (Attached Staffordshire Regiment)
- James Joseph Bernard Jackman
- Wilfred Wood
- John Scott Youll

== George Cross ==
Only one member of the regiment was the recipient of the George Cross:

- Derek Godfrey Kinne

== Amalgamation ==
On 23 April 1968, following the publication of the following notice in the London Gazette:

By virtue of the provisions of the Royal Warrant dated 5th April, 1968 (published in Army Order 18 of 1968) all officers of the Land Forces belonging to The Royal Northumberland Fusiliers (5th), The Royal Warwickshire Fusiliers (6th), The Royal Fusiliers (City of London Regiment) (7th), and The Lancashire Fusiliers (20th) are transferred to the Royal Regiment of Fusiliers with effect from 23rd April, 1968.

The regiment was amalgamated into the new Royal Regiment of Fusiliers.

== Battle honours ==
Early wars
By 1881 the 5th foot had been awarded the following battle honours:

| Honour | Date of action or campaign | Date of grant |
|---|---|---|
| Wilhelmsthal | 1762 | 1836 |
| Roleia | 1808 | 1817 |
| Vimiera | 1808 | 1825 |
| Corunna | 1809 | 1825 |
| Busaco | 1810 | 1825 |
| Ciudad Rodrigo | 1812 | 1817 |
| Badajoz | 1812 | 1818 |
| Salamanca | 1812 | 1817 |
| Vittoria | 1813 | 1817 |
| Nivelle | 1813 | 1817 |
| Orthes | 1814 | 1818 |
| Toulouse | 1814 | 1818 |
| Peninsula | 1808–1814 | 1815 |
| Lucknow | 1857 | 1863 |
| Afghanistan 1878–1880 | 1878–1880 | 1881 |

Second Boer War
The regiment received two battle honours for the conflict: "Modder River" and "South Africa, 1899–1902".

First World War
The regiment was awarded the following 67 battle honours:

- **Mons**
- Le Cateau
- Retreat from Mons
- **Marne 1914**
- Aisne 1914 '18
- La Bassée 1914
- Messines 1914 '17 '18
- Armentières 1914
- **Ypres 1914 '15 '17 '18**
- Nonne Bosschen
- Gravenstafel
- **St. Julien**
- Frezenburg
- Bellewaarde
- Loos
- **Somme 1916 '18**
- Albert 1916 '18
- Bazentin
- Delville Wood
- Pozières
- Flers-Courcelette
- Morval
- Thiepval
- Le Transloy
- Ancre Heights
- Ancre 1916
- Arras 1917 '18
- **Scarpe 1917 '18**
- Arleux
- Pilckem
- Langemarck 1917
- Menin Road
- Polygon Wood
- Broodseinde
- Passchendaele
- Cambrai 1917 '18
- St. Quentin
- Bapaume 1918
- Rosieres
- Lys
- Estaires
- Hazebrouck
- Bailleuil
- Kemmel
- Béthune
- Scherpenberg
- Drocourt Quéant
- Hindenburg Line
- Epéhy
- Canal du Nord
- St. Quentin Canal
- Beaurevoir
- Courtrai
- **Selle**
- Valenciennes
- Sambre
- France and Flanders 1914–18
- **Piave**
- Vittorio Veneto
- Italy 1917–18
- **Struma**
- Macedonia 1915–18
- **Suvla**
- Landing at Suvla
- Scimitar Hill
- Gallipoli 1915
- Egypt 1916–17

Those shown in bold print were selected to be borne on the king's colours.

Second World War
They were awarded twenty-nine battle honours:

- Defence of Escaut
- Arras Counter Attack
- St. Omer-La Bassée
- **Dunkirk 1940**
- Odon
- **Caen**
- Cagny
- Falaise
- Nederrijn
- **Rhineland**
- North-West Europe 1940 '44-45
- **Sidi Barrani**
- **Defence of Tobruk**
- **Tobruk 1941**
- Belhamed
- **Cauldron**
- Ruweisat Ridge
- **El Alamein**
- Advance on Tripoli
- Medenine
- North Africa 1940-43
- **Salerno**
- Volturno Crossing
- Monte Camino
- Garigliano Crossing
- **Cassino II**
- Italy 1943-45
- Singapore Island

Those shown in bold print were selected to be borne on the king's colours.

Korean War
In August 1958, the Regiment was awarded the following battle honours:

- **Imjin**
- Seoul
- Kowang-San
- **Korea 1950-51.**

Those shown in bold print were selected to be borne on the regimental colours.

== Colonels of the regiment ==
Colonels have included:

=== Named after Colonel ===
English regiment of the Dutch Anglo-Scots Brigade

- 1674 Colonel Daniel, Viscount Clare
- 1675 Major-General Sir John Fenwick; resigned after quarrelling with William
- 1676 Colonel Henry Wisely; drowned at sea
- 1680 Colonel Thomas Monck; died 1687
- 1687 Lieutenant-General Thomas Tollemache

English establishment

- 1688 Lieutenant-General Thomas Tollemache; transferred to Coldstream Guards, May 1689
- 1689 Colonel Edward Lloyd
- 1690 Major-General Thomas Fairfax
- 1704 Lieutenant-General Thomas Pearce
- 1732 Lieutenant-General Sir John Cope KB
- 1737 Lieutenant-General Alexander Irwine

=== 5th Regiment of Foot ===
- 1752 Colonel Charles Whitefoord
- 1754 Major-General Lord George Bentinck
- 1759 Field Marshal Studholme Hodgson
- 1768 General Hugh, Earl Percy KG

=== 5th (Northumberland) Regiment of Foot ===
- 1784 Lieutenant-General Hon. Edward Stopford
- 1794 Field Marshal Sir Alured Clarke GCB
- 1801 Lieutenant-General Richard England
- 1812 Lieutenant-General William Wynyard
- 1819 General Sir Henry Johnson GCB

=== 5th (Northumberland Fusiliers) Regiment of Foot ===
- 1835 General Sir Charles Colville GCB GCH
- 1843 Lieutenant-General Sir Jasper Nicolls KCB
- 1849 General Sir John Grey KCB
- 1856 Lieutenant-General William Lovelace Walton
- 1865 Major-General William Longworth Dames
- 1868 Major-General Edward Rowley Hill

=== Northumberland Fusiliers ===
- 1878 General William Lygon Pakenham, 4th Earl of Longford
- 1887 General Joseph Henry Laye
- 1895 Lieutenant-General Frederick Arthur Willis
- 1899 Lieutenant-General Sir George Bryan Milman
- 1915 Major-General Sir Percival Spearman Wilkinson

=== Royal Northumberland Fusiliers ===
- 1935 Major-General William Norman Herbert
- 1947 Major-General Harold de Riemer Morgan
- 1953 Field Marshal Sir Francis Wogan Festing
- 1965 Major-General Roger Ellis Tudor St John

== In popular culture ==
In the beginning of the Sherlock Holmes story A Study in Scarlet, Sir Arthur Conan Doyle states that Dr. John Watson served with the 5th Northumberland Fusiliers as an assistant surgeon.

== See also ==
- Fusiliers Museum of Northumberland
- Northumbrian tartan
- Tyneside Irish Brigade
- Tyneside Scottish Brigade

== Sources ==
- Boose, Donald (2014). The Ashgate Research Companion to the Korean War. Routledge. ISBN 978-1409439288.
- Bowling, A H (1971). British Infantry Regiments 1660-1914. London: Almark. ISBN 978-0855240004.
- Cannon, Richard (1838). Historical Record of the Fifth Regiment of Foot or Northumberland Fusiliers. London. ISBN 9780665484940.
- Forty, George (1998). British Army Handbook 1939–1945. Stroud, Gloucestershire: Sutton Publishing Limited. ISBN 978-0-7509-1403-1.
- Field-Marshal His Majesty the King (1916). Regimental Nicknames and Traditions of the British Army. London: Gale & Polden Ltd.
- Haythornthwaite, Philip J. (1996). The World War One Source Book. London: Arms and Armour Press. ISBN 978-1-85409-351-6.
- James, Brigadier E.A. (1978). British Regiments 1914–18. London: Samson Books Limited. ISBN 978-0-906304-03-7.
- Wood, Denis (1988). The Fifth Fusiliers and Its Badges. London: D. R. Wood. ISBN 978-0-9513285-0-7.
