= Lena Milman =

British translator (1862–1914)

Angelena Frances Milman, known as Lena Milman (1862–1914) was a British translator, critic and architectural historian. Milman translated Fyodor Dostoevsky's novel Poor Folk and contributed to Aubrey Beardsley's Yellow Book. Near the end of her life she married a colonial administrator and author, Edward Ashley Walrond Clarke, living with him in Zanzibar from 1909 to 1913. As A.W. Clarke, he was author of Jaspar Tristram (1899) one of the first English novels with an overtly homosexual theme.

== Life ==
Milman was born in 1862 in London, the only child of General Sir Bryan Milman.

Milman's 1894 translation of Dostoevsky's Poor Folk was well-received in the periodical press. She became a contributor to Aubrey Beardsley's Yellow Book, writing on Henry James, and later contributing a short story set in Venice. She befriended a range of writers including Thomas Hardy and Henry James. George Moore's letters to her, in which she was "a sounding board for his aesthetic theories", were subsequently published.

In 1908 Milman published a book on Sir Christopher Wren. In November 1908 she married a Foreign Office official, Edward Ashley Clarke. Clarke was appointed British Agent and Consul General to Zanzibar, and the pair set up residence in Zanzibar. A 1908-1910 scrapbook of Milman's experiences is held by the Melville J. Herskovits Library of African Studies at Northwestern University. While in Zanzibar, she wrote on the conversion by John Houston Sinclair, the architecturally trained British Resident, of a powder magazine into his country house.

After the death of her husband in 1913, Milman returned to England, and died on 16 January 1914 in Bloomsbury. Her will left instructions that she be buried in the churchyard of St Lawrence, Stratford-sub-Castle. She left a bequest of £10,000 to the Community of the Resurrection, and a bequest for two choristers, the 'Clarke Chanters', at Southwark Cathedral. She left her scrapbooks to the British Museum.

== Works ==
- (ed. with Ellen Kett) Amens: collected from sources ancient and modern. London: Novello, Ewer, [1887?]
- (tr.) Poor Folk by Fyodor Dostoevsky. 1894. With an introduction by George Moore, and a title page and cover design by Aubrey Beardsley.
- "A Few Notes upon Mr. James" . Yellow Book. Vol. 7. pp. 71–83. October 1895 – via Wikisource.
- "Marcel: An Hotel-Child". Yellow Book. 12: 141–164. January 1897.
- Sir Christopher Wren. London: Duckworth & Co., 1908.
- 'A Country House in Zanzibar', Architectural Review 31 (January 1912)
