= Reginald Thynne =

British Army general

Major-General Sir Reginald Thynne KCB
- Born: 23 December 1843; Walton, Somerset
- Died: 30 December 1926 (aged 83)
- Military career
- Allegiance: United Kingdom
- Branch: British Army
- Rank: Major-General
- Commands: North Eastern District
- Awards: Knight Commander of the Order of the Bath

Major-General Sir Reginald Thomas Thynne KCB (23 December 1843 – 30 December 1926) was a British Army officer who became General Officer Commanding North Eastern District.

== Early life ==
Thynne was born at the rectory of Walton, Somerset, the son of Lord John Thynne and a grandson of Thomas Thynne, 2nd Marquess of Bath.

== Military career ==
Thynne was commissioned as an ensign in the Grenadier Guards on 3 October 1862. After seeing action in the Anglo-Zulu War in 1879 and then in the Anglo-Egyptian War in 1882, he became commanding officer of 3rd Battalion Grenadier Guards and then went on to be General Officer Commanding North Eastern District in 1894 before retiring in 1902.

He was appointed a Knight Commander of the Order of the Bath (KCB) in the 1902 Coronation Honours list published on 26 June 1902, and invested as such by King Edward VII at Buckingham Palace on 24 October 1902.

Thynne's daughter (Katharine) Angela married the civil servant Sir Vincent Baddeley in 1933.

Military offices
Preceded by Henry Wilkinson	GOC North Eastern District; 1894–1902	Succeeded by Edward Browne
