= Frederick Willis (British Army officer) =

British Army general

Lieutenant-General Sir Frederick Willis KCB
- Born: Frederick Arthur Willis; 16 July 1827; Kensington, London
- Died: 28 May 1899 (aged 71); Worplesdon, Surrey
- Military career
- Allegiance: United Kingdom
- Branch: British Army
- Rank: Lieutenant-General
- Commands: Northern District
- Awards: Knight Commander of the Order of the Bath

Lieutenant-General Sir Frederick Arthur Willis KCB (16 July 1827 – 28 May 1899) was a British Army General who held high office in the 1880s.

== Military career ==
Willis was commissioned into the 70th Regiment of Foot in 1844.

In 1881, he was invited to command an Infantry Brigade at Aldershot and then in 1884 he was appointed General Officer Commanding Northern District. He remained in this post until 1886.

He was awarded the colonelcy of the Northumberland Fusiliers from 1895 to his death in 1899.

He was made KCB posthumously in the 1899 Birthday Honours, which were announced days after his death.

Military offices
Preceded by William Cameron	GOC Northern District; 1884–1886	Succeeded by Charles Daniell
Preceded by Joseph Henry Laye	Colonel of the Northumberland Fusiliers; 1895–1899	Succeeded by Sir George Bryan Milman
