= John Garvock =

British Army general

General Sir John Garvock GCB
- Born: 15 March 1817; Kennington, Surrey
- Died: 10 November 1878 (aged 61); South Kensington, London
- Military career
- Allegiance: United Kingdom
- Branch: British Army
- Rank: General
- Commands: 2nd Infantry Brigade at Shorncliffe; 1st Infantry Brigade at Dover; Northern District; Southern District
- Conflicts: Ambela Campaign
- Awards: Knight Grand Cross of the Order of the Bath

General Sir John Garvock (15 March 1817 – 10 November 1878) was a British Army General who achieved high office in the 1860s.

Garvock, the only son of Maj. John Garvock of the Royal Horse Guards and his wife, Margaret, was born in Kennington, Surrey, in 1817.

== Military career ==
Garvock was commissioned into the 10th Regiment of Foot in 1835. By 1839 he was serving as an Adjutant in the 10th Regiment of Foot. He went on to command 2nd Infantry Brigade at Shorncliffe in October 1860 and 1st Infantry Brigade at Dover in July 1861.

In 1863 he took command of the Eusufzye Field Force, a formation which conducted a foray against Hindustani tribesmen in Umbela (now Ambela) in the North West Frontier during what is now known as the Ambela Campaign. He was appointed General Officer Commanding Northern District in England in October 1866 and General Officer Commanding Southern District in July 1877.

He was subsequently Colonel of the 89th Foot and then the 10th Foot.

Military offices
Preceded by Sir Sydney Cotton	GOC Northern District; 1866–1871	Succeeded by George Carey
Preceded by Sir Charles Hastings Doyle	GOC Southern District; 1877–1878	Succeeded by Prince Edward of Saxe-Weimar
Preceded by Charles Gascoyne	Colonel of the 89th (The Princess Victoria's) Regiment of Foot; 1870–1874	Succeeded by Caledon Richard Egerton
Preceded by Sir Sidney John Cotton	Colonel of the 10th (the North Lincolnshire) Regiment of Foot; 1874–1878	Succeeded by Prince Edward of Saxe-Weimar
