= Charles Daniell =

British Army general

Major-General Charles Daniell CB
- Born: 21 August 1827; Berkhamsted, Hertfordshire
- Died: 26 July 1889 (aged 61); South Kensington
- Military career
- Allegiance: United Kingdom
- Branch: British Army
- Rank: Major-General
- Commands: Northern District
- Conflicts: Crimean War
- Awards: Companion of the Order of the Bath

Major-General Charles Frederick Torrens Daniell CB (21 August 1827 – 26 July 1889) was a British Army officer who held high office in the 1880s.

== Military career ==
Born in Berkhamsted in Hertfordshire, the youngest son of Thomas Daniell of Aldridge Lodge, Staffordshire and Little Berkhamsted in Hertfordshire and of Mary née Smith of the Smith banking family, Daniell was commissioned into the 38th Regiment of Foot.

In 1884 he was invited to command an Infantry Brigade at Malta and then in 1886 he was appointed General Officer Commanding Northern District. He remained in this post until 1889.

== Family ==
In 1849, he married Charlotte Vernon and then in 1856 he married Mary Smith.

Military offices
Preceded by Frederick Willis	GOC Northern District; 1886–1889	Succeeded by Nathaniel Stevenson
