= John Grey (British Army officer, died 1856) =

British Officer and East India company official

Lieutenant-General Sir John Grey KCB
- Born: 1782
- Died: 19 February 1856 (aged 73–74)
- Military career
- Allegiance: United Kingdom
- Branch: British Army
- Service years: 1814–1854
- Rank: Lieutenant-General
- Commands: Bombay Army
- Awards: Knight Commander of the Order of the Bath

Lieutenant-General Sir John Grey KCB (baptised 18 March 1782 – 19 February 1856) was an officer of British Army and the East India Company forces, and was the Commander-in-chief of the Bombay Army from 30 December 1850 to 22 November 1852.

== Military career ==
He was a younger son of Charles Grey of Morwick Hall, Northumberland and his first wife, Catherine (or Katherine) Maria Skelly, granddaughter of the Duke of Gordon. His mother died 21 June 1786, aged 33.

He was a grandson of John Grey of Howick, youngest brother of Charles Grey, 1st Earl Grey. He entered the army on 18 January 1798 as ensign of the 75th Foot, and became lieutenant on 8 May 1799. He served with the 75th in the war against Tipu Sahib, including the battle of Malavelly and the storming and capture of Seringapatam (where he was awarded a medal). He became captain in the 15th battalion, army of reserve, 31 October 1803, exchanged to the 82nd Foot the year after, became major 9th garrison battalion 27 November 1806, and exchanged to the 5th Foot, with the 2nd battalion of which he served in the Peninsula War. He was at the combat of El Bodon, the siege of Ciudad Rodrigo, including the scaling of the faussebraie and storming of the greater breach, which was carried by the 2nd-5th, during which operations he was twice wounded, and in the action at Fuenteguinaldo (Peninsular medal).

Grey became lieutenant-colonel in 1812, and commanded the 2nd battalion of his regiment at home until it was disbanded in 1816. After many years on half-pay, Grey, who became a major-general in 1838, was appointed to a divisional command in Bengal, which he held from 1840 to 1845. In the Gwalior campaign, at the head of the left wing of the army, he defeated a force of twelve thousand Mahrattas at Punniar on 29 December 1843, the day when the main body of the Mahratta army was defeated by Hugh Gough, 1st Viscount Gough at Maharajpore. For this service Grey was made K.C.B.

Grey was commander-in-chief of the Bombay Army and second member of the council at Bombay from 1850 to 1852. He was appointed colonel of the 73rd (Highland) Regiment of Foot from 1846 to 1849, transferring as colonel to the 5th (Northumberland Fusiliers) Regiment of Foot on 18 May 1849. He was promoted lieutenant-general in 1851 and full general in 1855.

Grey died at Morwick Hall on 19 February 1856.

== Family ==
Grey married in 1830 Rosa Louisa, only daughter of Captain Sturt of the Royal Navy, by whom he had no issue. His elder brother (Charles Grey, captain 85th foot, killed at New Orleans in 1815) having predeceased him, the Morwick branch of the Greys of Howick became extinct at Grey's death.

Military offices
Preceded by Sir Willoughby Cotton	C-in-C, Bombay Army; 1850–1852	Succeeded by Lord Frederick FitzClarence
Preceded by Sir Jasper Nicolls	Colonel of the 5th (Northumberland Fusiliers) Regiment of Foot; 1849–1856	Succeeded by William Lovelace Walton
Preceded by Sir Robert Henry Dick	Colonel of the 73rd (Highland) Regiment of Foot; 1846–1849	Succeeded by Sir Richard Goddard Hare Clarges
