= Edward Rowley Hill =

British Army general

General Edward Rowley Hill
- Born: 1795
- Died: 1878 (aged 82–83)
- Military career
- Allegiance: United Kingdom
- Branch: British Army
- Rank: General
- Commands: 1st West India Regiment

General Edward Rowley Hill (1795–1878) was a British Army officer who served as colonel of the 5th (Northumberland Fusiliers) Regiment of Foot.

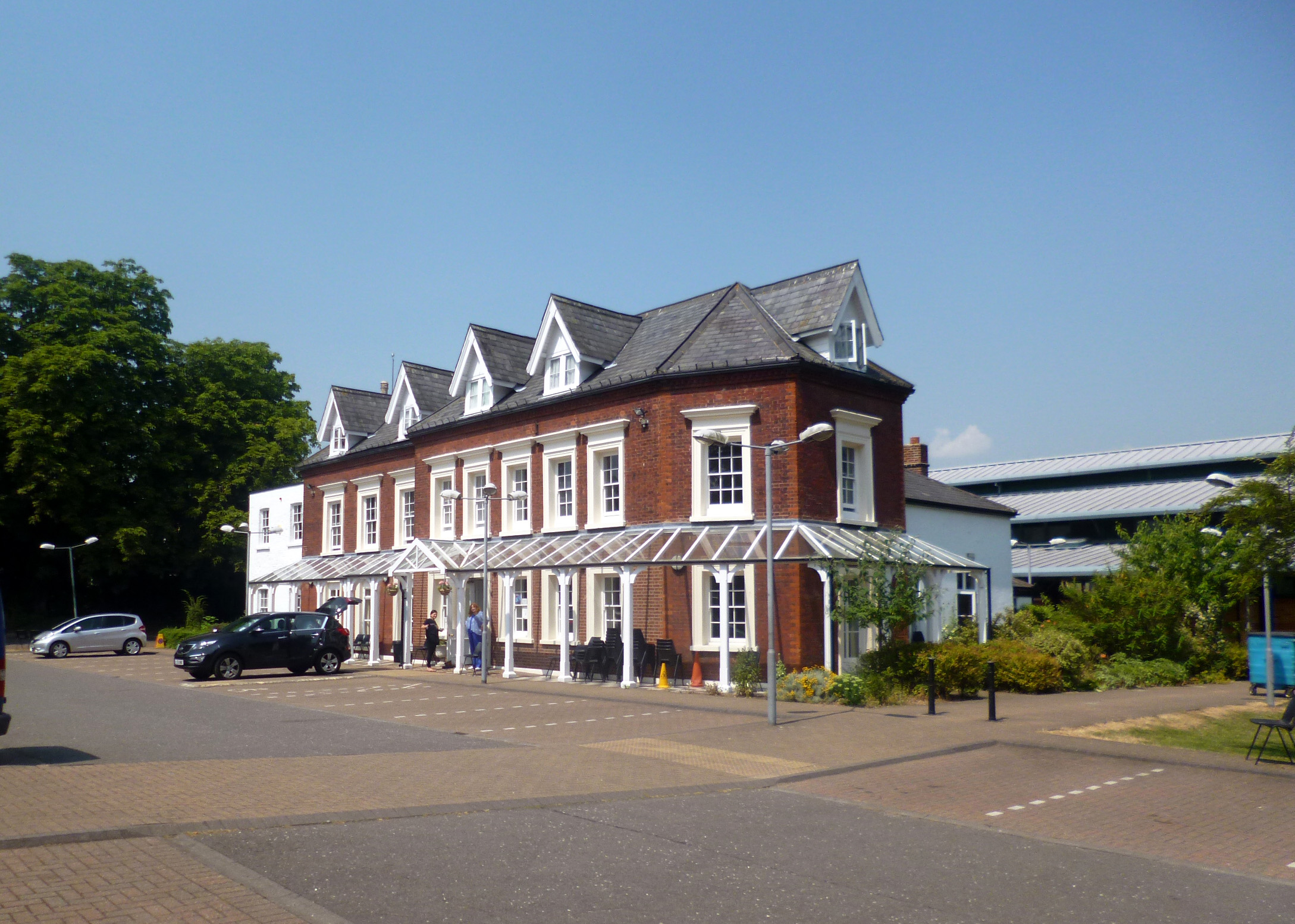
Allum Hall, Hill's Country House in Elstree

== Military career ==
Hill was commissioned into the 43rd Regiment of Foot on 23 February 1813. Promoted to lieutenant-colonel on 1 January 1847, he became commanding officer the 1st West India Regiment on 17 August 1855 and Deputy Adjutant-General in the Windward Islands and Leeward Islands on 10 September 1858. He lived at Allum Hall in Elstree in the 1850s and became colonel of the 5th (Northumberland Fusiliers) Regiment of Foot in 1868.

Military offices
Preceded by William Longworth Dames	Colonel of the 5th (Northumberland Fusiliers) Regiment of Foot; 1868–1878	Succeeded by William Lygon Pakenham, 4th Earl of Longford
