= Bryan Milman =

British Army general officer (1822–1915)

Lieutenant-General Sir Bryan Milman KCB
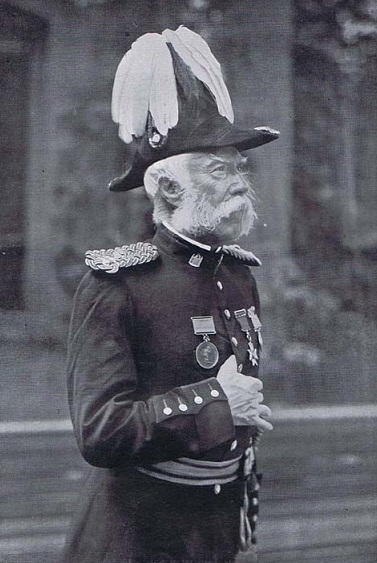
- Milman in 1896
- Born: 30 December 1822
- Died: 28 January 1915 (aged 92)
- Military career
- Allegiance: United Kingdom
- Branch: British Army
- Rank: Lieutenant-General
- Conflicts: Indian Rebellion
- Awards: Knight Commander of the Order of the Bath

Lieutenant-General Sir George Bryan Milman KCB (30 December 1822 – 28 January 1915) was a British Army officer who served as colonel of the Northumberland Fusiliers. His daughter was the writer Lena Milman.

== Military career ==
Milman was commissioned into the 5th Regiment of Foot on 24 May 1839. As a captain he saw action as a member of the advance guard in the first relief of Lucknow in September 1857 during the Indian Rebellion. In retirement became major of the Tower of London in 1870 and colonel of the Northumberland Fusiliers in May 1899, succeeding Major General F. A. Willis.

He was the recipient of the Gold Medal from the Royal Humane Society for swimming ashore to seek assistance for 5 fellow officers after their boat capsized in bad weather.

Honorary titles
Preceded by Frederick Willis	Colonel of the Northumberland Fusiliers; 1899–1915	Succeeded by Sir Percival Wilkinson
