= Joseph Henry Laye =

Lieutenant-General Joseph Henry Laye CB CVO
- Born: 4 February 1849; Auckland, New Zealand
- Died: 26 June 1938 (aged 89); Dawlish, England
- Military career
- Allegiance: United Kingdom
- Branch: (United Kingdom of Great Britain and Ireland) British Army
- Rank: Lieutenant-General
- Commands: 1st Battalion, Scottish Rifles
- Conflicts: Ninth Xhosa War; Anglo-Zulu War
- Awards: Companion of the Order of the Bath; Commander of the Royal Victorian Order

Lieutenant-General Joseph Henry Laye CB CVO (4 February 1849 – 26 June 1938) was a British Army officer who served as Deputy Adjutant-General to the Forces.

== Military career ==
Laye served in both the Ninth Xhosa War from 1877 to 1878 and the Anglo-Zulu War of 1879. He commanded the 1st Battalion Scottish Rifles from 1889 to 1893. He was a temporary assistant adjutant-general at army headquarters until February 1900, when he became Deputy Adjutant-General to the Forces, with the temporary rank of major general.

Laye was appointed a Companion of the Order of the Bath in the 1902 Coronation Honours published on 26 June 1902, and received the decoration from King Edward VII at Buckingham Palace on 24 October.

Laye died of a heart attack on 26 June 1938, aged 89.

Honorary titles
Preceded by William Pakenham, 4th Earl of Longford	Colonel of the Northumberland Fusiliers; 1887–1895	Succeeded by Frederick Arthur Willis
