= George Jackson Carey =

British Army general

Major-General George Jackson Carey CB
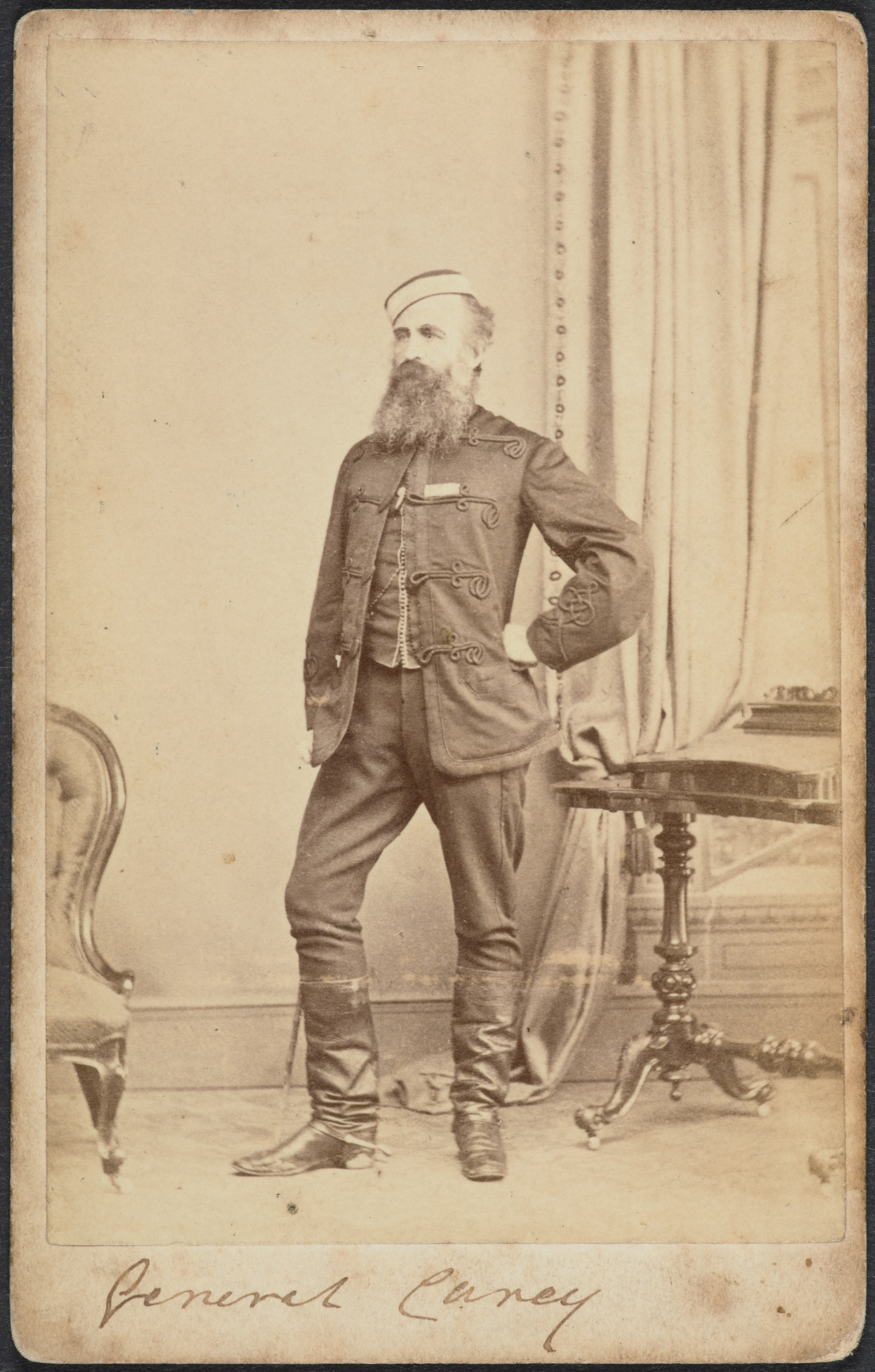
- Brigadier-General Carey, c. 1860
- Born: 5 October 1822
- Died: 12 June 1872 (aged 49)
- Spouse: Olivia Hester Thomson (m. 1861)
- Military career
- Allegiance: United Kingdom
- Branch: (United Kingdom of Great Britain and Ireland) British Army
- Rank: Major-General
- Units: Cape Mounted Riflemen; 18th (Royal Irish) Regiment of Foot
- Commands: Northern District
- Conflicts: Cape Frontier Wars; New Zealand Wars; Invasion of Waikato; Orakau
- Awards: South Africa Medal (1853) & Brevet of Lt Colonel; Companion of the Most Honourable Order of the Bath

Major-General George Jackson Carey CB (5 October 1822 – 12 June 1872) was a British Army officer who achieved high office in the 1860s.

== Early life ==
Carey was the eldest son of Thomas Carey, of Rozel, Guernsey, by his second wife, Barbara, daughter of Colonel Jackson, MP. He was educated at Elizabeth College in Guernsey.

== Military career ==
Carey was commissioned into the Cape Mounted Rifles in 1845 and served in the Cape Frontier Wars as few years later. Having served with distinction in the Cape Mounted Rifles, of which he became major, he was military secretary to Sir James Jackson, when commanding the forces at the Cape, and was ultimately colonel of the 18th Irish.

Carey subsequently transferred to 2nd Battalion, 18th (Royal Irish) Regiment of Foot. In 1863, he went to New Zealand and commanded the troops at the Capture of Orakau, a Māori stronghold. In 1865 he signed a peace treaty with Wiremu Tamihana, the Māori leader.

He served as acting Governor and Administrator of Victoria between May and August 1866, A Brigade commander at Aldershot in 1867 and General Officer Commanding Northern District in 1871. He was given command of the 2nd Division during 1871 training maneuverers. He died the following year.

== Family ==
On 9 February 1861 he married Olivia Hester Thompson and together they went on to have four children.

Military offices
Preceded by Sir John Garvock	GOC Northern District; 1871–1872	Succeeded by Daniel Lysons
