= Jasper Nicolls =

Commander in Chief of India

Lieutenant-General Sir Jasper Nicolls KCB
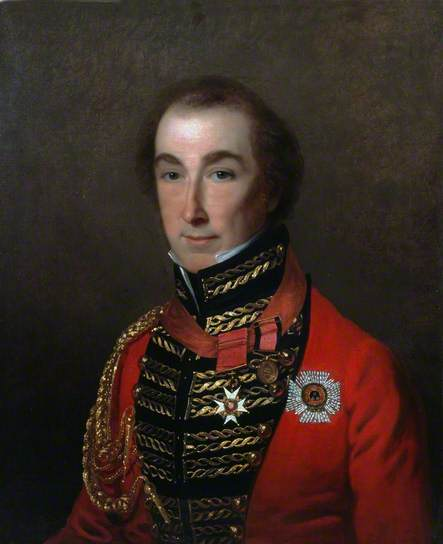
- Born: 15 July 1778; East Farleigh, Kent
- Died: 4 May 1849 (aged 70); Reading, Berkshire
- Education: Dublin University
- Spouse: Anne Badcock (m. 1809)
- Relatives: Oliver Nicolls (uncle)
- Military career
- Allegiance: United Kingdom
- Branch: British Army
- Service years: 1793–1849
- Rank: Lieutenant-General
- Units: 45th Regiment of Foot; Royal York Rangers
- Commands: 2/14th Regiment of Foot; 7th (Meerut) Division; Madras Army; Commander-in-Chief, India
- Conflicts: French Revolutionary Wars; West Indies campaign; Second Anglo-Maratha War; Battle of Argaon; Capture of Gawilghur; Napoleonic Wars; Hanover Expedition; British invasions of the River Plate; Peninsular War; Battle of Corunna; Walcheren Expedition; Anglo-Nepalese War; Third Anglo-Maratha War; Siege of Bharatpur
- Awards: Army Gold Medal

Lieutenant-General Sir Jasper Nicolls KCB (15 July 1778 – 4 May 1849) was a British Army officer who served as Commander-in-Chief, India, from 1839 to 1843.

== Military career ==
Born at East Farleigh in Kent and educated at a private school in Ballygall and at Trinity College, Dublin, Nicolls was commissioned into the 45th Regiment of Foot in 1793.

Nicolls spent five or six years in the West Indies, attaining the rank of captain on 12 September 1799. In 1802 he proceeded to India as military secretary and aide-de-camp to his uncle, Major-general Oliver Nicolls, commander-in-chief in the Bombay presidency. A few days after the Battle of Assaye joined the army commanded by Sir Arthur Wellesley (the future Duke of Wellington) during the Second Anglo-Maratha War (1803–1805). It is not clear whether he went as a volunteer or was appointed to the staff; but, according to Stocqueler, he was employed in the quartermaster-general's department. Nicolls was present at the Battle of Argaon and Siege of Gawilghur in 1803.

Nicolls returned home soon after the close of the war, and obtained his regimental majority on 6 July 1804. In the following year the 45th Foot formed part of Lord Cathcart's expedition to Hanover, and Major Nicolls accompanied it.

In 1806 he sailed with the force under Brigadier-general Crawford, first to the Cape of Good Hope, and afterwards on Lieutenant-general John Whitelocke's campaign to the Rio de la Plata. Nicolls was present at the disastrous attack on Buenos Aires in July 1807. In the ill-organised assault on that town Nicolls found himself isolated with seven companies of his regiment, his colonel having become separated with one or two companies from the main body of the 45th. In this trying position he displayed conspicuous resolution, and, repelling the attack of the enemy, held his ground. On the following day, in pursuance of an arrangement between Whitelocke and the Spanish general Liniers, Nicolls, together with the other isolated bodies, evacuated the town. The 45th, unlike several other bodies of British troops, did not surrender, and Nicolls refused to give up the colours of his regiment. So conspicuous was his conduct on this occasion that Whitelocke in his despatches thus writes of him: "Nor should I omit the gallant conduct of Major Nichols [sic] of the 45th regiment, who, on the morning of the 6th instant, being pressed by the enemy near the Presidentia, charged them with great spirit and took two howitzers and many prisoners". Nicolls was the only regimental officer whose name appeared in the despatches. At the subsequent trial by court-martial of Whitelocke he was one of the witnesses.

In 1807 he was appointed commanding officer of the 2nd Battalion of the 14th Regiment of Foot, and he went on to fight at the Battle of Corunna and to take part in the Walcheren Campaign in 1809.

In 1811 he became assistant adjutant-general at Horseguards and in 1812 he was made deputy adjutant-general in Ireland. Later that year he went to India as quartermaster-general. In 1815, during the Gurkha War he captured Almora and reduced Kumaon.

In 1825 he was made general officer commanding a division of the Madras Presidency and in 1829 he transferred to become GOC 7th (Meerut) Division; in 1838 he was appointed commander-in-chief of the Madras Army. In 1839 he was promoted to Commander-in-Chief, India; he returned to England in 1843.

He was appointed colonel of the 93rd (Sutherland Highlanders) Regiment of Foot in 1833, transferring as colonel to the 5th (Northumberland Fusiliers) Regiment of Foot in April 1843, a position he held until his death in 1849.

== Family ==
In 1809 he married Anne, eldest daughter of Thomas Stanhope Badcock of Little Missenden Abbey, Buckinghamshire, and together they went on to have one son and eight daughters.

== Notes ==
Military offices
Preceded by Sir Henry Fane	Commander-in-Chief, India; 1839–1843	Succeeded by Sir Hugh Gough
Preceded by Sir Peregrine Maitland	C-in-C, Madras Army; 1838–1839	Succeeded by Sir Samuel Whittingham
Preceded by Sir Charles Colville	Colonel of the 5th (Northumberland Fusiliers) Regiment of Foot; 1843–1849	Succeeded by Sir John Grey
Preceded by Sir Henry Pigot	Colonel of the 38th (1st Staffordshire) Regiment of Foot; 1840–1843	Succeeded by Sir Hugh Arbuthnot
Preceded by John Cameron	Colonel of the 93rd (Highland) Regiment of Foot; 1833–1840	Succeeded by Sir James Douglas
