= Michael Saward (British Army officer) =

British Army general

Major-General Michael Saward

Lieutenant Governor of Guernsey
- In office 1899–1903
- Preceded by: Nathaniel Stevenson
- Succeeded by: Barrington Campbell

Personal details
- Born: 22 December 1840
- Died: 1928

Military service
- Allegiance: United Kingdom
- Branch/service: British Army
- Years of service: c. 1860–1903
- Rank: Major-General

Major-General Michael Henry Saward (22 December 1840 – 1928) was a British Army officer who became Lieutenant Governor of Guernsey.

== Military career ==
Saward became a lieutenant in the Royal Artillery in Bengal in 1862. He remained in Bengal throughout his career and was ultimately appointed Assistant Adjutant General of the Royal Artillery in Bengal, a post he only relinquished in 1894. He was appointed Lieutenant Governor of Guernsey in 1899.

He is buried at St John the Evangelist Church at Dormansland in Surrey. He was also a Colonel Commandant of the Royal Artillery.

== Family ==
In 1877 he married Kath Maisey.

Government offices
Preceded by Nathaniel Stevenson	Lieutenant Governor of Guernsey; 1899–1903	Succeeded by Barrington Campbell
