= Hutton Terrace drill hall, Newcastle upon Tyne =

Hutton Terrace drill hall
- Newcastle upon Tyne
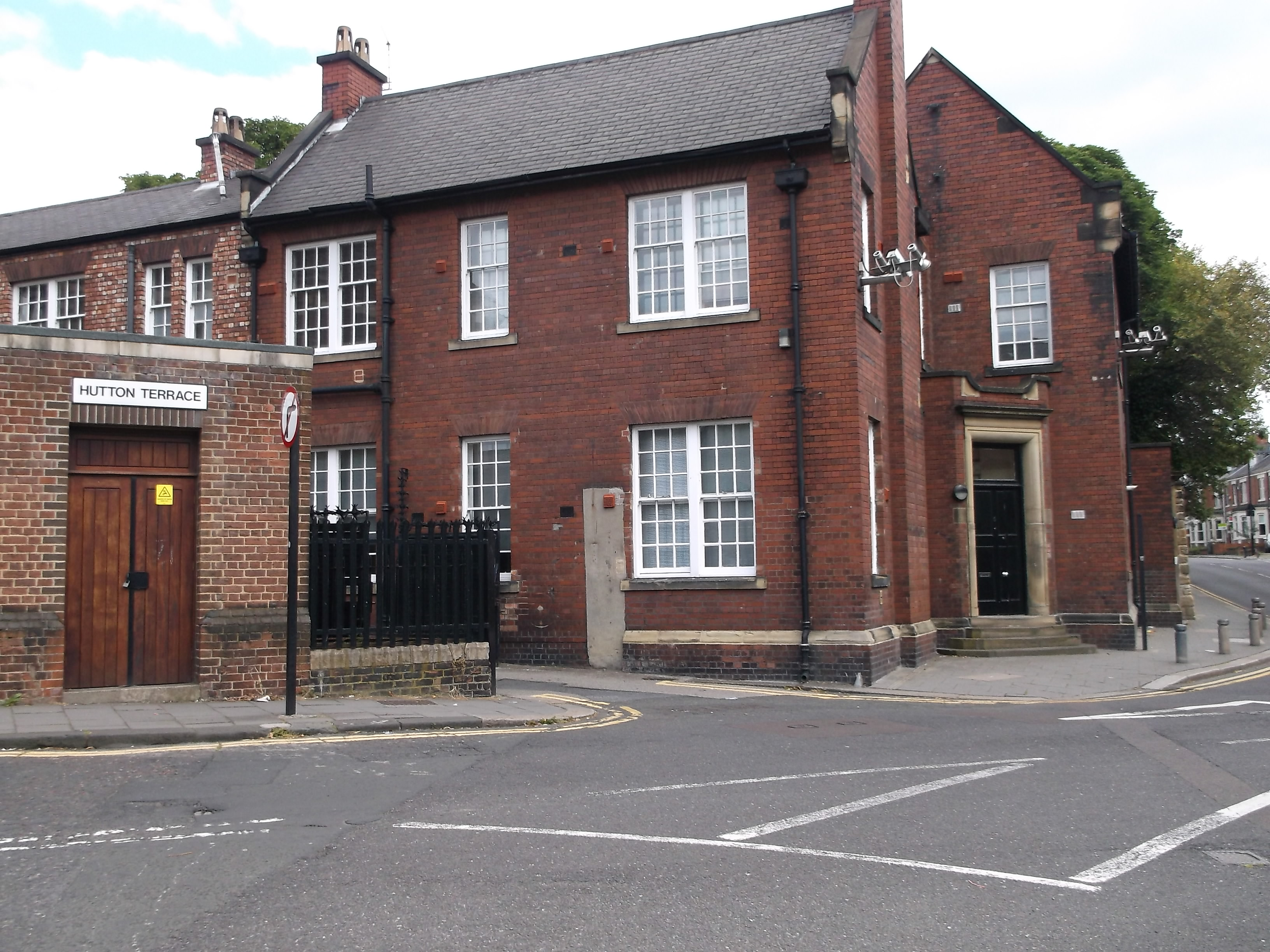
- Hutton Terrace drill hall, Newcastle upon Tyne

Site information
- Type: Drill hall

Location
- Location within Tyne and Wear
- Coordinates: 54.98205°N 1.60066°W

Site history
- Built: c.1900
- Built for: War Office
- In use: c.1900-?

The Hutton Terrace drill hall is a former military installation in Jesmond, Newcastle upon Tyne, England.

== History ==
The building was designed as a drill hall in the early 20th century and became the headquarters of the 8th (Cyclist) Battalion, The Northumberland Fusiliers when that unit was renamed the Northern Cyclist Battalion in 1910. The battalion was mobilised at the drill hall in August 1914 before moving to its pre-planned war station at Morpeth. The drill hall was, at that time, also home to 1st Northumbrian Field Ambulance, Royal Army Medical Corps. The Northern Cyclist Battalion was absorbed into the 3rd (Northumbrian) Medium Brigade, Royal Garrison Artillery in 1920. Prior to the Second World War, the headquarters of 149th (Northumberland) Infantry Brigade was based at the drill hall. The building has since been redeveloped for residential use.
