= William Lovelace Walton =

General William Lovelace Walton
- Born: 1788
- Died: 11 January 1865 (aged 76–77)
- Military career
- Allegiance: United Kingdom
- Branch: British Army
- Rank: General
- Commands: Coldstream Guards
- Conflicts: Napoleonic Wars

General William Lovelace Walton (1788 – 11 January 1865) was a British Army officer who served as colonel of the 5th (Northumberland Fusiliers) Regiment of Foot.

== Military career ==
Walton was commissioned as an ensign in the Coldstream Guards on 8 May 1806. He was present at the Battle of Copenhagen in September 1807 during the Napoleonic Wars. He then saw action at the Battle of Talavera in July 1809, the Battle of Bussaco in September 1810 and the retreat to the Lines of Torres Vedras in Spring 1811. He served as battalion adjutant at the Battle of Waterloo in June 1815. He went on to become commanding officer of his regiment in December 1839.

In retirement, he became colonel of the 5th (Northumberland Fusiliers) Regiment of Foot in March 1856 until his death in 1865. He was promoted full General on 6 March 1863.

Military offices
Preceded by Sir John Grey	Colonel of the 5th (Northumberland Fusiliers) Regiment of Foot; 1856–1865	Succeeded by William Longworth Dames
