= Henry Wilkinson (British Army officer) =

British Army officer

Lieutenant-General Sir Henry Wilkinson KCB
- Born: 17 April 1837; Mount Oswald, Durham, County Durham, England
- Died: 23 November 1908 (aged 71); Kenora, Ontario, Canada
- Military career
- Allegiance: United Kingdom
- Branch: British Army
- Service years: 1856–1894
- Rank: Lieutenant-General
- Commands: North Eastern District
- Awards: Knight Commander of the Order of the Bath

Lieutenant-General Sir Henry Clement Wilkinson KCB (17 April 1837 – 23 November 1908) was a British Army officer who became General Officer Commanding North Eastern District.

== Early life ==
Wilkinson was born in Durham, County Durham, the son of Rev. Percival Spearman Wilkinson of Mount Oswald. He was the uncle of Sir Percival Spearman Wilkinson.

== Military career ==
Wilkinson was commissioned as an ensign in the 95th (Derbyshire) Regiment of Foot on 15 February 1856. He saw action at the capture of Gwalior during the Indian Rebellion and then became commanding officer of the 16th The Queen's Lancers in 1870. He went on to be Inspector General of Auxiliary Cavalry at Aldershot in 1877, Military Secretary to the Commander-in-Chief, India, in 1880 and, after serving in the Second Anglo-Afghan War in 1880, commander of the Cavalry Brigade and Quetta District in 1880. After that he became commander of the Bozdar Field Force in 1881 and then saw action as Commander of the Indian Cavalry Brigade during the Anglo-Egyptian War in 1882. He then became commander of the Sialkot Brigade and commander of the Sauger and Presidency Districts in 1882 and General Officer Commanding North Eastern District in 1891 before retiring in 1894.

He was appointed a Knight Commander of the Order of the Bath on 25 June 1897.

Military offices
Preceded by Nathaniel Stevenson	GOC North Eastern District; 1891–1894	Succeeded by Reginald Thynne
