= William Longworth Dames =

British Army general

Lieutenant-General William Longworth Dames
- Born: 2 March 1806
- Died: 20 February 1868 (aged 61)
- Military career
- Allegiance: United Kingdom
- Branch: British Army
- Rank: Lieutenant-General
- Conflicts: Indian Rebellion

Lieutenant-General William Longworth Dames (2 March 1806 – 20 February 1868) was a British Army officer who served as colonel of the 5th (Northumberland Fusiliers) Regiment of Foot.

== Military career ==
Dames was commissioned into the 66th Regiment of Foot on 26 July 1826 and promoted to lieutenant on 24 November 1828. Promoted to lieutenant-colonel on 1 November 1842, he commanded the British forces during the siege of Azimghur in April 1858 during the Indian Rebellion. He became colonel of the 5th (Northumberland Fusiliers) Regiment of Foot in 1865.

Military offices
Preceded by William Lovelace Walton	Colonel of the 5th (Northumberland Fusiliers) Regiment of Foot; 1865–1868	Succeeded by Edward Rowley Hill
