= Sydney Cotton =

British Army officer (1792–1874)

Lieutenant-General Sir Sydney Cotton GCB
- Born: 2 December 1792
- Died: 19 February 1874 (aged 81)
- Burial place: Brompton Cemetery, London
- Military career
- Allegiance: United Kingdom
- Branch: British Army
- Rank: Lieutenant-General
- Commands: Northern District
- Conflicts: Indian Rebellion
- Awards: Knight Grand Cross of the Order of the Bath

Lieutenant-General Sir Sydney John Cotton GCB (2 December 1792 – 19 February 1874) was a British Army officer. He served for 45 years in India, commanded the garrison on the NW Frontier at Peshawar, where he introduced more realistic training for troops. While serving in Australia was the commandment of the Moreton Bay penal colony in Australia.

== Military career ==
Born the second son of Henry Calveley Cotton of Woodcote, Oxfordshire, England, and his wife Matilda, daughter and heiress of John Lockwood of Dews Hall, Essex, Cotton joined the British Army in 1810 as a Cornet in the 22nd Light Dragoons.

He served in India from 1810 to 1835.

He served extensively in Australia (1835 to 1842) including being the commandant of the Moreton Bay penal colony (now the city of Brisbane) from 1837 to 1839.

He returned to India for further service 1842 to 1863, including service throughout the Indian Rebellion of 1857–58.

For his frontier services, Cotton was appointed KCB and after returning to England he became General Officer Commanding Northern District in July 1865. He was promoted to lieutenant-General in 1866 and, after publishing "Nine Years on the North-West Frontier of India from 1854 to 1863" in 1868, he was advanced to GCB in 1872.

He was Governor of the Royal Hospital Chelsea from 1872 until 1874.

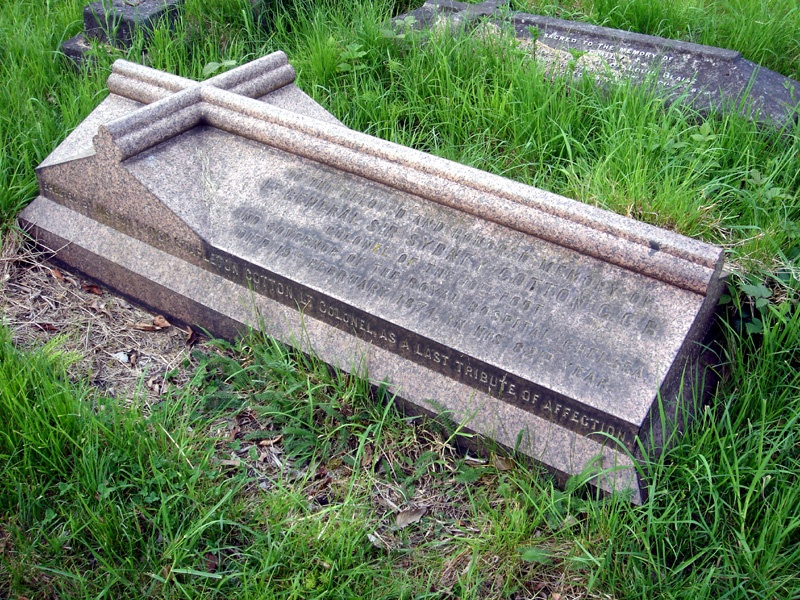
Funerary monument, Brompton Cemetery, London.

He is buried in Brompton Cemetery, London.

Mount Cotton, Queensland is named after him.

== See also ==
- Rev. Richard Lynch Cotton (1794–1880), younger brother
- Sir Arthur Thomas Cotton (1803–1899), younger brother

Military offices
Preceded by Sir George Wetherall	GOC Northern District; 1865–1866	Succeeded by Sir John Garvock
Honorary titles
Preceded by Sir John Pennefather	Governor, Royal Hospital Chelsea; 1872–1874	Succeeded by Sir Patrick Grant
