= Vincent Baddeley =

British civil servant

Sir Vincent Baddeley KCB
- Baddeley in March 1949.

Deputy Secretary of the Admiralty
- In office December 1931 – 31 December 1935

First Principal Assistant Secretary of the Admiralty
- In office 1921–1931

Assistant Secretary for Finance Duties, Admiralty
- In office October 1911 – 1920

Principal Private Secretary to the First Lord of the Admiralty
- In office 1902–1911

Personal details
- Born: Vincent Wilberforce Baddeley; 24 September 1874
- Died: 25 July 1961 (aged 86)

Sir Vincent Wilberforce Baddeley KCB (24 September 1874 − 25 July 1961) was a British civil servant who spent almost all his career at the Admiralty.

Baddeley was the son of the Reverend J. J. Baddeley (died 1924), rector of Chelsfield, Kent. He won scholarships to Marlborough College and Pembroke College, Oxford, joined the War Office as a clerk (class I) in December 1897 and transferred to the Admiralty Secretariat as a higher division clerk in May 1899. From November 1901 to 1911, he served as private secretary (assistant private secretary until 1902, and thereafter principal private secretary) to four successive First Lords of the Admiralty: Lord Selborne, Lord Cawdor (at whose funeral on 11 February 1911 he was a pallbearer), Lord Tweedmouth and Reginald McKenna. In 1904, he accompanied the First Sea Lord, Admiral Sir John Fisher, on a visit to naval educational establishments in the United States. In 1910, he was promoted to principal clerk.

From October 1911 to 1920, Baddeley was assistant secretary for finance duties. From 1921 to 1931, he was first principal assistant secretary of the Admiralty, during which time he served as government commissioner to determine the allowance to be paid to officers stationed at naval shore establishments abroad, visiting Malta, Bombay, Ceylon, Singapore, Hong Kong, Shanghai and Bermuda. From December 1931 until his retirement on 31 December 1935 he was deputy secretary of the Admiralty. From its inauguration in 1920 until 1950 he was Admiralty representative on the board of trustees of the Imperial War Museum. He was appointed Companion of the Order of the Bath (CB) in the June 1911 Coronation Honours and Knight Commander of the Order of the Bath (KCB) in the 1921 New Year Honours.

For much of his life Baddeley lived alone in a flat in Barton Street, Westminster, where he entertained the young resident clerks of the Admiralty, who lived in the Admiralty building itself to handle business at night and at the weekends. He had himself been a resident clerk at the beginning of his career, and recognised how lonely it could be. However, on 4 October 1933, in St Faith's Chapel, Westminster Abbey, he married (Katharine) Angela Thynne MBE (died 3 February 1990), daughter of Major-General Sir Reginald Thynne. Immediately after his retirement, the couple left for a three-month holiday in South Africa. On 31 July 1936, Lady Baddeley was given the honour of launching the Grampus-class submarine HMS Rorqual at Barrow-in-Furness.

In retirement, Baddeley was on the board of the Alliance Insurance Company from 1935 to 1953 and was prime warden of the Fishmongers' Company in 1936−37. In March 1937, he was elected an honorary fellow of Pembroke College, Oxford. From 1932, he was a member of the council of the Navy Records Society. He was a member of the Travellers Club and an honorary member of the Royal Yacht Squadron. On 24 July 1949, he suffered head injuries and a fractured leg after being knocked down by a car on Windsor Bridge. Baddeley was an enthusiastic walker and a committed Christian.
