= Tower House, York =

Tower House
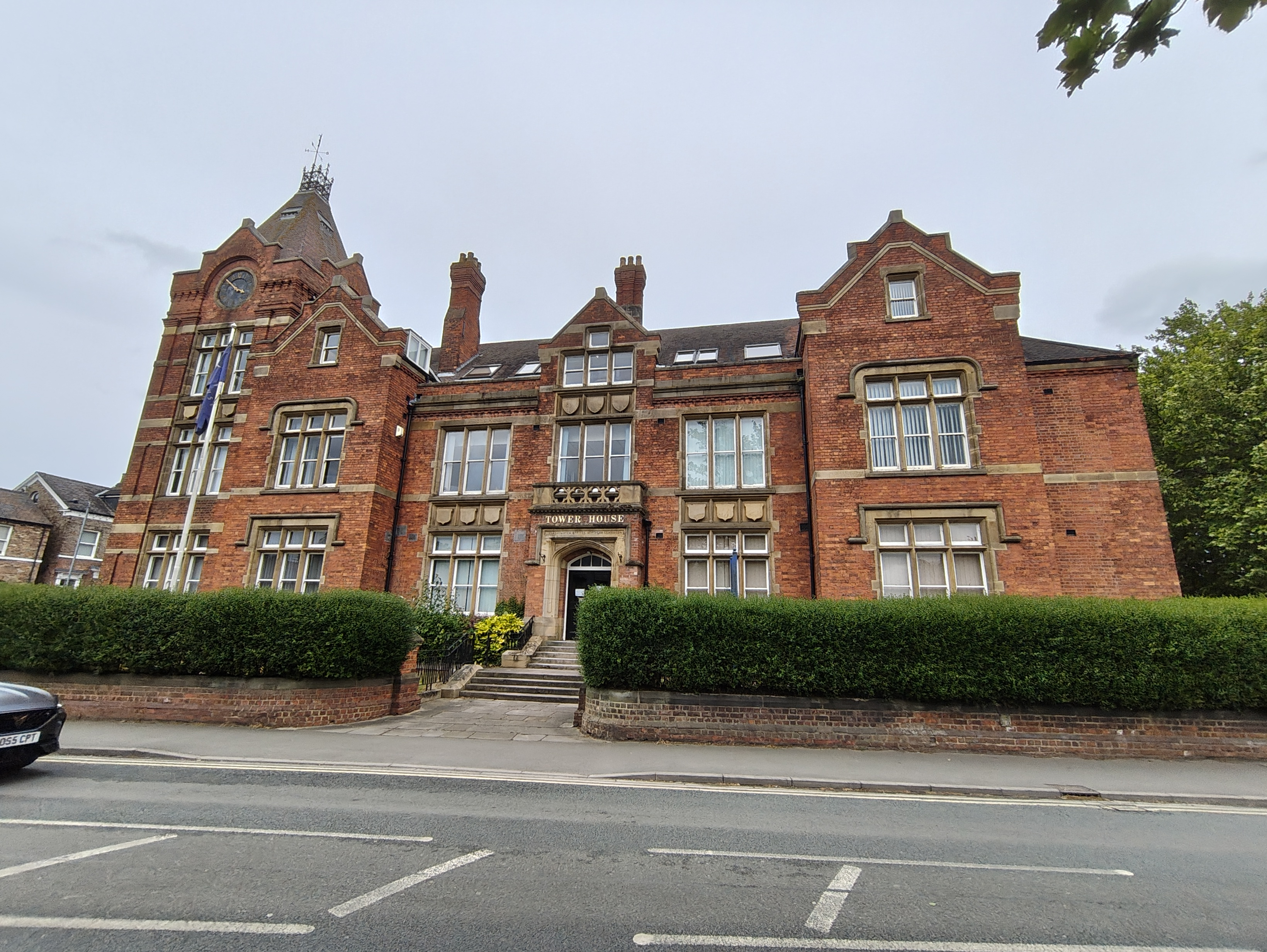
- Tower House
- Interactive map of the Tower House area

General information
- Architectural style: Victorian style
- Location: Fishergate, York
- Coordinates: 53.9511°N 1.0754°W
- Completed: 1878

Tower House is a former military headquarters building in Fishergate, York, England.

== History ==
The building, which was designed in the Victorian style, was opened as the headquarters of the North-Eastern Military District in October 1878. It became the headquarters of Northern Command in 1905. The Fishergate site was named Imphal Barracks in 1951, but closed in 1958, when Northern Command HQ moved to a new Imphal Barracks on Fulford Road, York. The former headquarters at Fishergate was restored and refurbished as a business centre in the early 1990s. It is described as a "building of merit" in the local conservation area appraisal.
