= Nathaniel Stevenson =

British Army general

General Nathaniel Stevenson
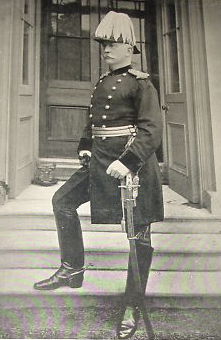
- Born: 1840
- Died: 1911 (aged 70–71)
- Military career
- Allegiance: United Kingdom
- Branch: British Army
- Service years: 1858–1899
- Rank: General
- Commands: Northern District

General Nathaniel Stevenson (1840–1911) was a British Army officer who became Lieutenant Governor of Guernsey.

== Military career ==
Stevenson was commissioned as an ensign in the 1st Regiment of Foot in 1858. In 1863 he was transferred to the 87th Regiment of Foot. He was appointed assistant adjutant and quartermaster-general for Cork District in 1880 and then, having served as Assistant-Adjutant and Quartermaster-General on the Staff, he was appointed Deputy Adjutant-General in Ireland in 1884. He was appointed General Officer Commanding Northern District in 1889, General Officer Commanding North Eastern District later in the year and Lieutenant Governor of Guernsey in 1894. It was in that capacity that he went to Westminster Abbey in 1898 to attend former Prime Minister Gladstone's funeral.

He was appointed Colonel of the Royal Inniskilling Fusiliers on 8 March 1902.

Military offices
Preceded by Charles Daniell	GOC Northern District; 1889	Succeeded by Command divided
Preceded by New Post	GOC North Eastern District; 1889–1891	Succeeded by Henry Wilkinson
Preceded by William Roberts	Colonel of the Royal Inniskilling Fusiliers; 1902–1911	Succeeded by Sir Archibald James Murray
Government offices
Preceded by Sir Edward Bulwer	Lieutenant Governor of Guernsey; 1894–1899	Succeeded by Michael Saward
