= Poor Folk =

1846 novel by Fyodor Dostoyevsky

- First English language edition
- Author: Fyodor Dostoevsky
- Original title: Бедные люди
- Translator: Lena Milman
- Language: Russian
- Genre: Epistolary novel
- Publication date: January 15, 1846
- Publication place: Russia
- English publication date: 1894
- Media type: Print (Hardback & Paperback)
- OCLC: 2041466
- Dewey Decimal: 891.73/3
- LC Class: PG3328

Poor Folk (Russian: Бедные люди, romanized: Bednyye lyudi), sometimes translated as Poor People, (Note: Depending on the translation, the work is also known as Poor People as the Russian word for "poor" (bedny) has different meanings, such as misfortune, poverty, trouble or calamity, and the nearest translation for lyudi in this case is "people", not "folk".) is the first novel by Fyodor Dostoevsky, written over the span of nine months between 1844 and 1845, and first published on 15 January 1846. Dostoevsky was in financial difficulty because of his extravagant lifestyle and his developing gambling addiction; although he had produced some translations of foreign novels, they had little success, and he decided to write a novel of his own to try to raise funds.

Inspired by the works of Gogol, Pushkin and Karamzin, as well as English and French authors, Poor Folk is written in the form of letters between the two main characters, Makar Devushkin and Varvara Dobroselova, who are poor third cousins twice removed. The novel showcases the life of poor people, their relationship with rich people, and poverty in general, all common themes of literary naturalism. A deep but odd friendship develops between them until Dobroselova loses her interest in literature, and later in communicating with Devushkin after a rich widower Mr. Bykov proposes to her. Devushkin, a prototype of the clerk found in many works of naturalistic literature at that time, retains his sentimental characteristics; Dobroselova abandons art, while Devushkin cannot live without literature.

Contemporary critics lauded Poor Folk for its humanitarian themes. While Vissarion Belinsky dubbed the novel Russia's first "social novel" and Alexander Herzen called it a major socialist work, other critics detected parody and satire. The novel uses a complicated polyphony of voices from different perspectives and narrators. Initially offered by Dostoyevsky to the liberal-leaning magazine Fatherland Notes, the novel was published in the almanac, St. Petersburg Collection, on January 15, 1846. It became a huge success nationwide. Parts of it were translated into German by Wilhelm Wolfsohn and published in an 1846/1847 magazine. The first English translation was provided by Lena Milman in 1894, with an introduction by George Moore, cover art design by Aubrey Beardsley and publication by London's Mathews and Lane.

== Plot ==
The two main characters

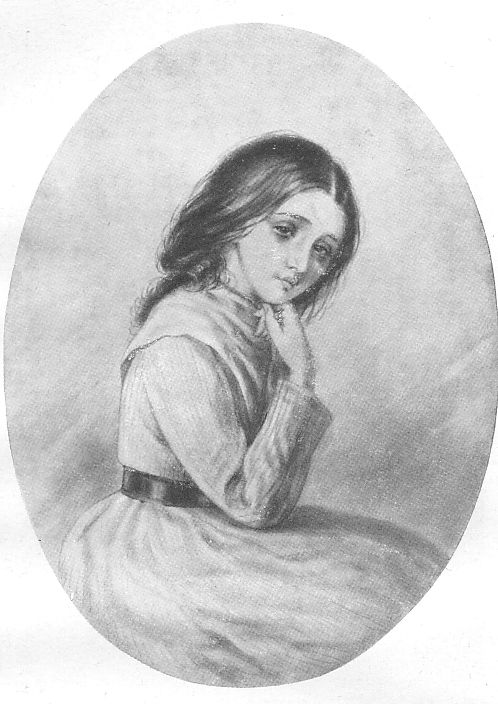
Varvara Dobroselova

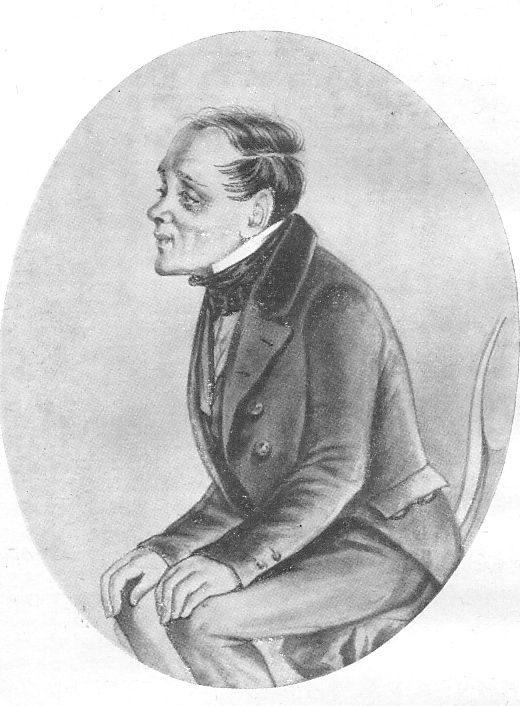
Makar Devushkin

Varvara Dobroselova and Makar Devushkin are second cousins twice-removed and live across from each other on the same street in terrible apartments. Devushkin's, for example, is merely a portioned-off section of the kitchen, and he lives with several other tenants, such as the Gorshkovs, whose son groans in agonizing hunger almost the entire story. Devushkin and Dobroselova exchange letters attesting to their terrible living conditions and the former frequently squanders his money on gifts for her.

The reader progressively learns their history. Dobroselova originally lived in the country, but moved to St. Petersburg (which she hates) when her father lost his job. Her father becomes very violent and her mother severely depressed. Her father dies and they move in with Anna Fyodorovna, a landlady who was previously cruel to them but at least pretends to feel sympathy for their situation. Dobroselova is tutored by a poor student named Pokrovsky, whose drunken father occasionally visits. She eventually falls in love with Pokrovsky. She struggles to save a measly amount of money to purchase the complete works of Pushkin at the market for his birthday present, then allows his father to give the books to him instead, claiming that just knowing he received the books will be enough for her happiness. Pokrovsky falls ill soon after, and his dying wish is to see the sun and the world outside. Dobroselova obliges by opening the blinds to reveal grey clouds and dirty rain. In response Pokrovsky only shakes his head and then passes away. Dobroselova's mother dies shortly afterwards, and Dobroselova is left in the care of Anna for a time, but the abuse becomes too much and she goes to live with Fedora across the street.

Devushkin works as a lowly copyist, frequently belittled and picked on by his colleagues. His clothing is worn and dirty, and his living conditions are perhaps worse than Dobroselova's. He considers himself a rat in society. He and Dobroselova exchange letters (and occasional visits that are never detailed), and eventually they also begin to exchange books. Devushkin becomes offended when she sends him a copy of "The Overcoat", because he finds the main character is living a life similar to his own.

Dobroselova considers moving to another part of the city where she can work as a governess. Just as he is out of money and risks being evicted, Devushkin has a stroke of luck: his boss takes pity on him and gives him 100 rubles to buy new clothes. Devushkin pays off his debts and sends some to Dobroselova. She sends him 25 rubles back because she does not need it. The future looks bright for both of them because he can now start to save money and it may be possible for them to move in together.

The writer Ratazyayev, who jokes about using Devushkin as a character in one of his stories, offends him, but genuinely seems to like him. Eventually Devushkin's pride is assuaged and their friendship is restored. The Gorshkovs come into money because the father's case is won in court. With the generous settlement they seem to be destined to be perfectly happy, but the father dies, leaving his family in a shambles despite the money. Soon after this, Dobroselova announces that a rich man, Mr. Bykov who had dealings with Anna Fyodorovna and Pokrovsky's father, has proposed to her. She decides to leave with him, and the last few letters attest to her slowly becoming accustomed to her new money.

She asks Devushkin to find linen for her and begins to talk about various luxuries, but leaves him alone in the end despite his improving fortunes. In the last correspondence in the story, on September 29, Devushkin begs Dobroselova to write to him. Dobroselova responds saying that "all is over" and to not forget her. The last letter is from Devushkin saying that he loves her and that he will die when he leaves her and then she will cry.

== Main characters ==
- Makar Alekseyevich Devushkin (Макар Алексеевич Девушкин) – the protagonist of Poor Folk is a shy, poor and lonely forty-seven-year-old clerk and copyist. He has been compared to other clerks from the "natural school" such as "The Overcoat"'s Akaky Akakievich. Although trying to use literature to understand life, Devushkin does not discuss these topics separately, and falsely believes that Dobroselova's letters reflect his life, taking short stories as realistic works. He exhibits typical sentimental characteristics; according to Robert Payne, Dostoyevsky "writes on the edge of sentimentality, but he is a completely credible and rounded figure". Devushkin's name derives from devushka, meaning maiden or girl, possibly symbolizing virginity and innocence, although Joseph Frank remarked it is an incongruent description.
- Varvara Alekseyevna Dobroselova (Варвара Алексеевна Добросёлова) – lives in similar conditions as Devushkin. Her decision to live with the unscrupulous Mr. Bykov makes her an outsider, not typical of sentimental novels; unlike the heroine in Samuel Richardson's 1748 novel Clarissa, she chooses the materialistic path and loses her interest in literature. Her name derives from dobro, meaning good, symbolizing her good-hearted personality.
- Mr. Bykov (Быков) – an old, rich, brutal widower. Successfully proposes to Dobroselova at the end. His name derives from byk, meaning bull, symbolizing sexual power and lust.

== Creation ==
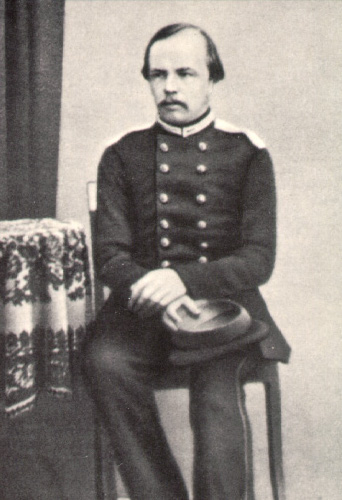
Dostoyevsky as an engineer

Dostoevsky showed interest in literature since his childhood. His mother's subscription to the Library of Reading enabled the family entry into the leading contemporary Russian and non-Russian literature. Gothic tales, such as by Ann Radcliffe, was the first genre Dostoevsky was introduced to. Other formative influences were the works by the poets Alexander Pushkin and Vasily Zhukovsky, heroic epics usually by Homer and chivalric novels by Cervantes and Walter Scott.

Dostoevsky initially attended the best private school in Moscow, the Chermak boarding school. Founded by a Czech immigrant who moved to Russia after the Napoleonic Wars, it put strong emphasis on literature. As the school required 800 rubles per year, his father had to do additional work and ask his aristocratic relatives, the Kumanins, for money. Although Dostoevsky settled in well, he had to leave after his mother's death on 27 September 1837 led to financial problems for his family. He was sent to the Military Engineering-Technical University; he had problems adjusting to life there, but nevertheless managed to graduate on 12 August 1843 as a military engineer. After his graduation, he lived a quite liberal lifestyle, attending many plays and the ballets of composers Ole Bull and Franz Liszt, and renting an expensive apartment, the Prianishnikov House, for 1,200 rubles, even though he was only earning 5,000 rubles per year. These events and his introduction to casinos were responsible for his deteriorating financial situation. He worked as a translator, but the translations he completed in 1843, such as Balzac's Eugénie Grandet and Sand's La dernière Aldini, were not very successful. His gambling and betting on billiard games were a huge drain on his funds because of his frequent losses. As a consequence, Dostoyevsky was often forced to ask his relatives for money, but he felt uncomfortable doing so and decided to write a novel to raise money. "It's simply a case", Dostoevsky wrote to his brother Mikhail, "of my novel covering all. If I fail in this, I'll hang myself."

Dostoevsky began working on Poor Folk in early 1844. He first mentioned the upcoming work in a letter to Mikhail on 30 September 1844: "I am finishing up a novel of the size of Eugénie Grandet. It's a rather original work." Dostoevsky later wrote to his brother on 23 March 1845, "I finished the novel in November, then rewrote it in December, and again in February–March. I am seriously satisfied with my novel. It is a serious and elegant work ..." Sometime around April 1845, his friend Dmitry Grigorovich, with whom he had shared an apartment since the autumn of 1844, proposed giving the manuscript to poet Nikolay Nekrasov, who was planning to issue an anthology in 1846. Dostoevsky took the manuscript to Nekrasov and returned home. Shortly afterwards the doorbell of his house rang, and he opened the door to the excited Nekrasov and Grigorovich, both of whom congratulated him on his debut novel, of which they had only read 10 pages. They finished the full 112-page work during the night at Dostoevsky's apartment. The next morning, the three men went to the critic Vissarion Belinsky; Nekrasov proclaimed Dostoevsky "the New Gogol" though Belinsky replied sceptically "You find Gogols springing up like mushrooms". Dostoevsky himself did not believe his book would receive a positive review from Belinsky, but when Nekrasov visited Belinsky in the evening, the latter wanted to meet Dostoevsky to congratulate him on his debut. Dostoevsky proposed to issue Poor Folk in the Fatherland Notes, but it was instead published in the almanac St. Petersburg Collection on January 15, 1846.

== Themes and style ==
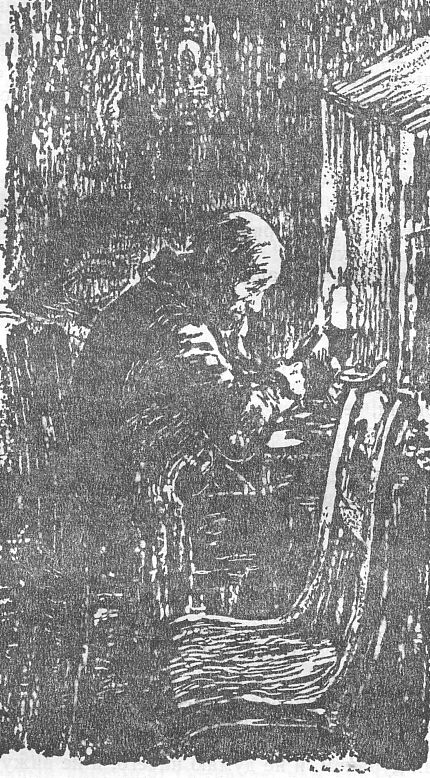
Makar Devushkin

Poor Folk explores poverty and the relationship between the poor and the rich, common themes of literary naturalism. Largely influenced by Nikolai Gogol's The Overcoat, Alexander Pushkin's The Stationmaster and Letters of Abelard and Heloise by Peter Abelard and Héloïse d’Argenteuil, it is an epistolary novel composed of letters written by Varvara and her close friend Makar Devushkin. The name of the book and the main female character were adapted from Nikolai Karamzin's Poor Liza. Additional elements include the backgrounds of the two protagonists and the tragic ending, both typical characteristics of a middle-class novel.

Belinsky and others saw The Overcoat as the inspiration for the novel. Later critics stated that the sentimental-humanitarian Poor Folk contained a great deal of parody and satire of Gogol books; however, there are some dissenters. Karin Jeanette Harmon guesses in "Double Parody Equals Anti-Parody" that Dostoyevsky mixes the parody of the sentimental epistolary novel with the parody of the naturalistic sketch of the clerk. Robert Payne rejects the idea of any satiric content; he notes that satire began in The Double. A similar view was held by Belinsky, who also stated that "Dostoyevsky's talent is ... not descriptive, but to the highest degree creative." Victor Terras thought that Dostoyevsky did not use satire except in a few cases, but instead employed a "humor derived from the eternal conflict between the simple soul of a good man and the complex apparatus of the soulless, institutionalized society run by 'clever' people." Joseph Frank, who suggested that the whole work is a "serious parody", recalled that Poor Folk burlesques the "high-society adventure novel, the Gogolian humorous local color-tale" and "the debunking physiological sketch". Victor Terras dubbed it a "travesty of the sentimental epistolary love story." The Contemporary stated "In this work comedy is somehow explored and includes an appreciable tone, colour and even the language of Gogol and Kvitka". "Through his tale", wrote The Northern Bee, "Dostoyevsky wanted to utilize Gogol's humour with naive simplicity of the undisturbed Osnovyanenko [pen name of Kvitka]." Another perspective that describes the connection between Poor Folk and The Overcoat is the position that the former is considered the continuation of the latter, that Dostoevsky picked up where Gogol left off in his tale about poor civil servants. This view does not imply that Dostoevsky did not offer innovations since this novel also distinguished itself by humanizing those that were – in Gogol's tale - mechanical and lifeless. This is aligned with the theory that Dostoevsky attempted – both in Poor Folk and The Double – to penetrate into the psychology of Gogol's characters. It is claimed that the result of Dostoevsky's unequivocal humanization of the Gogolian model intensified its effect. Gogol's debonair portrayal of sociopsychological frustrations is a case in point. Dostoevsky took a different path by highlighting its tragic aspect.

According to critic Rebecca Epstein Matveyev, Pushkin's "The Stationmaster" serves as a "thematic subtext, as a basis for Devushkin's literary experiments, and as a resource for his epistolary relationship." Both, The Stationmaster and The Overcoat, are mentioned in the letters between Dobroselova and Devushkin. Dostoevsky may have chosen the epistolary genre to include his personal critical observations, similar to real-life letters between writer and addressee. According to Yakubovich, Dostoevsky uses Poor Folk as his diary. However, as an external narrator is missing the only source for the character's motivation and personality is available in the letters and Dobroselova's diary. The numerous different voices, that is Devushkin's quotations from stories, his commentaries about these books and his own works, are examples of polyphony. These effects confuse the reader and hide the narrator.

Sexual guilt is another recognizable theme in Poor Folk. This is demonstrated, for instance, in the suggestion of something dishonorable in Varvara's past as well as the fact that she and Devushkin are distantly related, hinting an incestuous love. Other sources contributed in this view such as Konstantin Mochulsky who said that "the motif of an old man's loving a girl with its vague interweaving of eroticism and 'paternal affection' is one of Dostoevsky's favorite themes."

== Reception ==
Poor Folk received nationwide critical acclaim. Dostoevsky observed that "the whole of Russia is talking about my Poor Folk". As soon as he read the manuscript for Poor Folk, Belinsky named it Russia's first "social novel". Alexander Herzen praised the book in his essay "About the Progress of Revolutionary Ideas in Russia", noting the book's "socialistic tendencies and animations". The work was classified by critic Pavel Annenkov as a work of the so-called "natural school". The newspaper The Northern Bee recorded:

News about a new genius, Mr. Dostoevsky, is circulating across St. Petersburg. We do not know whether it is his real name or a pen-name. The reading audience is praising his new novel, Poor People. I have read this novel and said: 'Poor Russian readers!' However, Mr. Dostoevsky is a man of some talent and, if he finds his way in literature, he will be able to write something decent."

— The Northern Bee, 1 February 1848, no. 27

Nikolay Dobrolyubov, in the 1861 essay "Downtrodden People", wrote that Dostoevsky studies poor reality and expresses humanistic ideas. He also praised him for illustrating human nature and taking out "souls in the centre of the depth which are caged after protesting for identity against the exterior, violent pressure, and presents it to our verdict".

Apollon Grigoriev wrote in The Finnish Herald: "Dostoevsky starts to play in our literature the same role Hoffmann played in German literature ... He became so deeply immersed in the life of civil servants that the dull and uninteresting everyday life became for him a nightmare close to madness". Count Vladimir Sollogub also liked the novel, stating that "it was written with force and simplicity by a great talent". Valerian Maykov noted after a number of publications by Dostoevsky: "Gogol was usually the leading social poet, while Dostoevsky usually the leading psychological poet. The former is known as the representative of the contemporary society or contemporary circle, for the latter the society itself becomes interesting through its influence on other people".

== Translations ==
The following is a list of English versions (publication date in parentheses)

- (1894) Poor Folk, by Lena Milman
- (1900) Poor Folk, by Thomas Seltzer
- (1915) Poor Folk and the Gambler, by C. J. Hogarth
- (1917) Poor People, by Constance Garnett
- (1956) Poor Folk, by Lev Navrozov
- (1968) Poor People and A Little Hero, by David Magarshack
- (1982) Poor Folk, by Robert Dessaix
- (1989) Poor Folk, by David McDuff
- (2002) Poor People, by Hugh Aplin

== See also ==
- The Double

== Bibliography ==
- Apollonio, Carol (2009). Dostoevsky's Secrets: Reading Against the Grain. Northwestern University Press. ISBN 978-0-8101-2532-2.
- Barnhart, Joe E. (2005). Dostoevsky's Polyphonic Talent. University Press of America. ISBN 978-0-7618-3097-9.
- Bloshteyn, Maria R. (2007). The Making of a Counter-Culture Icon: Henry Miller's Dostoevsky. University of Toronto Press. ISBN 978-0-8020-9228-1.
- Carr, Edward Hallett (1962). Dostoevsky 1821–1881. Taylor & Francis. OCLC 319723.
- Dostoyevsky, Fyodor (1877). A Writer's Diary. Northwestern University Press. ISBN 9780810125216.
- Fanger, Donald (1998). Dostoevsky and Romantic Realism: A Study of Dostoevsky in Relation to Balzac, Dickens, and Gogol. Northwestern University Press. ISBN 978-0-8101-1593-4.
- Frank, Joseph (2009). Dostoevsky: A Writer in His Time. Vol. 1–5. Princeton University Press. ISBN 978-0-691-12819-1.
- Frank, Joseph (1979) [1976]. Dostoevsky: The Seeds of Revolt, 1821–1849. Princeton University Press. ISBN 978-0-691-01355-8.
- Hoisington, Sona Stephan (1995). A Plot of Her Own: The Female Protagonist in Russian Literature. Northwestern University Press. ISBN 978-0-8101-1224-7.
- Kaye, Peter (1999). Dostoevsky and English Modernism 1900–1930. Cambridge University Press. ISBN 978-0-521-62358-2.
- Kjetsaa, Geir (1989). A Writer's Life. Fawcett Columbine. ISBN 9780449903346.
- Lantz, Kenneth A. (2004). The Dostoevsky Encyclopedia. Greenwood Publishing Group. ISBN 978-0-313-30384-5.
- Meier-Gräfe, Julius (1988). Dostoevsky: The Man and His Work. insel verlag.
- Mochulsky, Konstantin (1973). Dostoevsky: His Life and Work. Princeton University Press. ISBN 0-691-01299-7.
- Müller, Ludolf (1982). Dostojewskij: Sein Leben, Sein Werk, Sein Vermächtnis (in German). Erich Wewel Verlag.
- Sekirin, Peter (1997). The Dostoevsky Archive: Firsthand Accounts of the Novelist from Contemporaries' Memoirs and Rare Periodicals, Most Translated Into English for the First Time, with a Detailed Lifetime Chronology and Annotated Bibliography. McFarland. ISBN 978-0-7864-0264-9.
- Terras, Victor (1998). Reading Dostoevsky. University of Wisconsin Press. ISBN 978-0-299-16054-8.
- Vinogradov, Viktor. Щкола сентиментального натурализма – Роман Достоевского "Бедные люди" на фоне литературной эволюции 40-х годов [School of the Sentimental Naturalism – Dostoyevsky's Novel Poor Folk Against the Background of Literary Evolution of the 1840s] (in Russian). Fundamental Electronic Library of Russian Literature and Folklore.
