= Northern Command (United Kingdom) =

- Active: 1793–1889; 1905–1972
- Country: United Kingdom
- Branch: British Army
- Type: Home Command
- Garrison/HQ: Newcastle upon Tyne; Manchester; York

Northern Command was a Home Command of the British Army from 1793 to 1889 and from 1905 to 1972.

== Nineteenth century ==
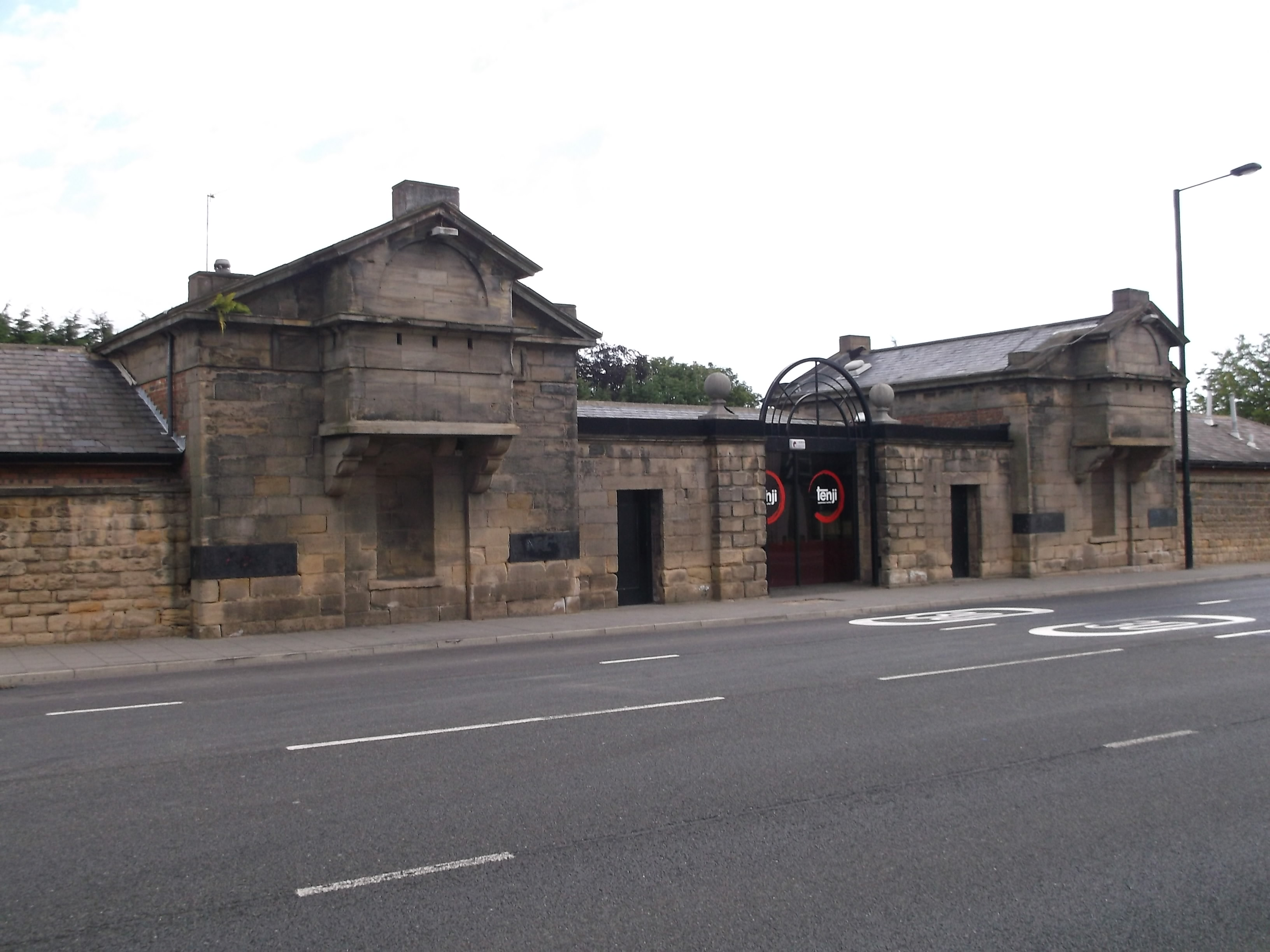
Fenham Barracks, Newcastle upon Tyne, command headquarters in the early 19th century.

Great Britain was divided into military districts on the outbreak of war with France in 1793. The formation in the North, which included Northumberland, Cumberland, Westmorland and Durham, was originally based at Fenham Barracks in Newcastle upon Tyne until other districts were merged in after the Napoleonic Wars.

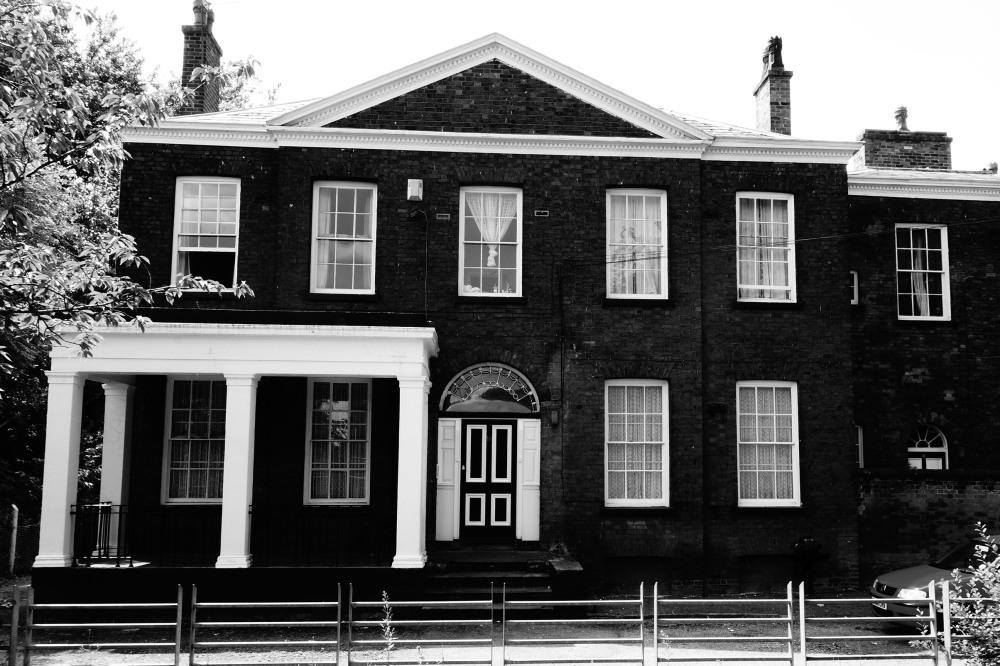
Hulme Barracks, Manchester, command headquarters from the 1840s to 1878.

In 1840 Northern Command was held by Major-General Sir Charles James Napier, appointed in 1838. During his time the troops stationed within Northern Command were frequently deployed in support of the civil authorities during the Chartist unrest in the northern industrial cities.

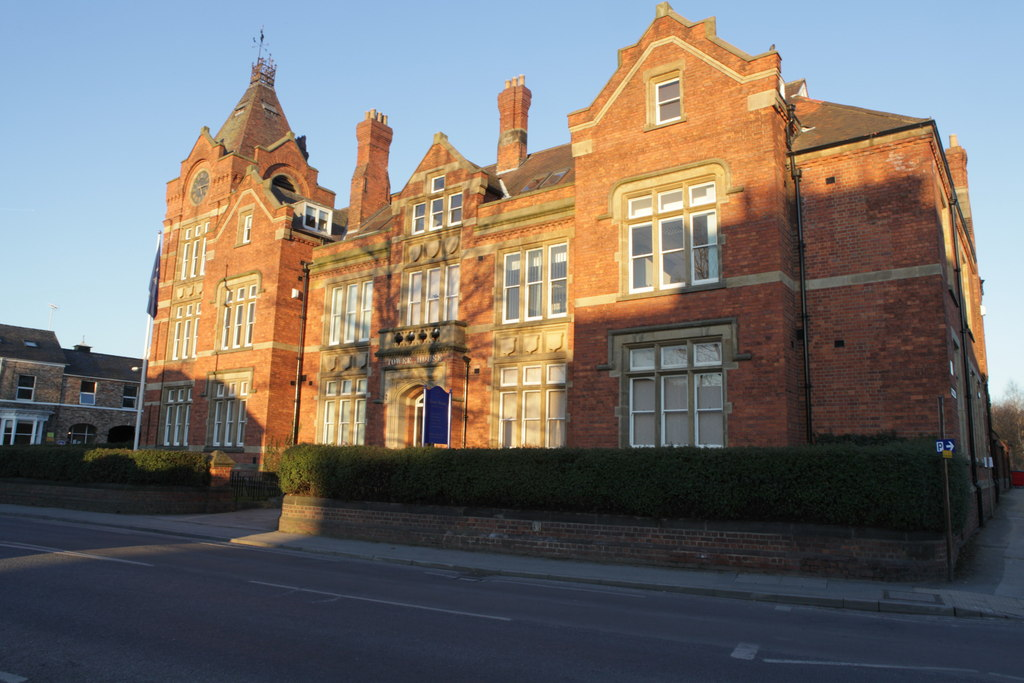
Tower House, Fishergate, York, command headquarters from 1878 to 1958.

Napier was succeeded in 1841 by Major-General Sir William Gomm, when the command included the counties of Northumberland, Cumberland, Westmorland, Durham, Yorkshire, Cheshire, Derbyshire, Lancashire, Nottinghamshire, Flintshire, Denbighshire and the Isle of Man, with HQ at Manchester. Later the Midland Counties of Shropshire, Lincolnshire, Leicestershire, Rutland, Warwickshire, Staffordshire and Northamptonshire were added and from 1850 to 1854 the Command included three sub-commands: NW Counties (HQ Manchester), NE Counties (HQ York) and Midlands (HQ Birmingham). From 1854 to 1857 there were two sub-commands, Northern Counties and Midland Counties, each with a brigade staff, but after that they disappeared and Northern Command remained a unitary command.

In 1876 a Mobilisation Scheme for the forces in Great Britain and Ireland was published, with the 'Active Army' divided into eight army corps based on the District Commands. 6th Corps and 7th Corps were to be formed within Northern Command, based at Chester and York respectively. The Northern Command Headquarters itself moved from Manchester to Tower House in Fishergate in York in 1878. The corps scheme disappeared in 1881, when the districts were retitled ‘District Commands. Northern Command continued to be an important administrative organisation until 1 July 1889, when it was divided into two separate Commands: North Eastern, under Major-General Nathaniel Stevenson (HQ York), and North Western, under Major-General William Goodenough (HQ Chester).

== Twentieth century ==
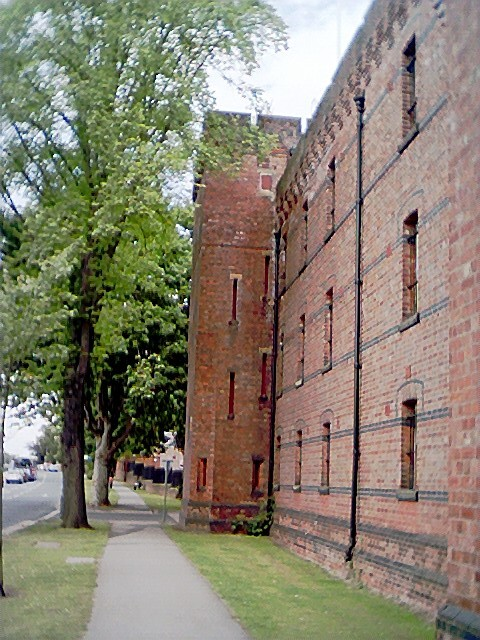
Imphal Barracks, York, command headquarters from 1958 to 1972.

The 1901 Army Estimates introduced by St John Brodrick allowed for six army corps based on six regional commands. As outlined in a paper published in 1903, V Corps was to be formed in a reconstituted Northern Command, with HQ at York. Major-General Sir Leslie Rundle was appointed acting General Officer Commanding-in-Chief (GOCinC) of Northern Command on 10 October 1903, and it reappears in the Army List in 1905, with the boundaries defined as 'Berwick-on-Tweed (so far as regards the Militia, Yeomanry and Volunteers) and the Counties of Northumberland, Cumberland, Westmoreland, Durham, Lancashire, Yorkshire and the Isle of Man. The defences on the southern shores of the estuaries of the Humber and Mersey are included in the Northern Command'. By 1908 the Midland Counties of Lincolnshire, Nottinghamshire, Derbyshire, Staffordshire, Leicestershire and Rutland had been added, but Westmoreland, Cumberland and Lancashire had been moved into Western Command.

The Command HQ was established at Tower House in Fishergate in York in 1905.

=== First World War ===
Army Order No 324, issued on 21 August 1914, authorised the formation of a 'New Army' of six divisions, composed of volunteers who had responded to Earl Kitchener's appeal (hence the First New Army was known as 'K1'). Each division was to be under the administration of one of the Home Commands, and Northern Command formed what became the 11th (Northern) Division. It was followed by the 17th (Northern) Division of K2 in September 1914.

At the end of 1914, Lieutenant General Sir Herbert Plumer, the GOCinC, left Northern Command to form V Corps in France, and Major-General Henry Lawson was placed in temporary command, followed by Lieutenant General Sir John Maxwell after he had suppressed the Easter Rising in Ireland. Maxwell was formally appointed GOCinC in November 1916.

=== Second World War ===
In 1939 Regular Troops reporting to Northern Command included 5th Infantry Division, based at Catterick. Other Regular Troops reporting to Northern Command at that time included:

- 15th/19th The King's Royal Hussars
- 7th Royal Tank Regiment
- 7th Field Regiment, Royal Artillery
- 9th/17th, 16th/43rd Field Batteries, Royal Artillery
- 20th Anti-Tank Regiment, Royal Artillery

Territorial Army troops included 25th Army Tank Brigade.

On 20 December 1942, the 77th Infantry (Reserve) Division was assigned to the command to act as its training formation. On 1 September 1944, the 77th was replaced by the 45th (Holding) Division.

==== Command Training Centres ====
Between 1941 and 1943, each regional command of the British Army formed at-least one training centre which trained those recruits preparing to move overseas. The centres which were based in the area were:

- Durham Light Infantry Training Centre, Brancepeth Castle, became No.4 Training Centre on 14 August 1941 — affiliated with The Duke of Wellington's (West Riding) Regiment and Durham Light Infantry
  - From 4 July 1941 included No.54 Physical Training Wing
- Green Howards Training Centre, Richmond Barracks, became No.5 Training Centre on 14 August 1941 — affiliated with The Duke of York's Own (East Yorkshire) Regiment, (Alexandra, Princess of Wales's Own) The North Yorkshire Regiment (Green Howards), and Manchester Regiment (infantry battalions only)
  - From 4 July 1941 included No.55 Physical Training Wing
- The King's Own Yorkshire Light Infantry Training Centre, Queen Elizabeth Barracks, became No.6 Training Centre on 14 August 1941 — affiliated with The Prince of Wales's Own (West Yorkshire) Regiment, Lancashire Fusiliers, and The King's Own (South) Yorkshire Light Infantry
  - From 4 July 1941 included No.56 Physical Training Wing
- Lincolnshire Infantry Training Centre, Sobraon Barracks, became No.7 Training Centre on 14 August 1941 — affiliated with Royal Lincolnshire Regiment, Nottinghamshire and Derbyshire Regiment (Sherwood Foresters), and York and Lancaster Regiment
  - From 4 July 1941 included No.57 Physical Training Wing

=== Post War ===
Among the TA troops active in Northern Command after the war was 9th Armoured Brigade, as an independent brigade.

The Fishergate site was named Imphal Barracks in 1951, but closed in 1958, when Northern Command HQ moved to a new Imphal Barracks on Fulford Road, York. Portions of the former headquarters at Fishergate are now serviced accommodation. The Command was merged into HQ UK Land Forces (HQ UKLF) in 1972.

== General Officers Commanding-in-Chief ==
GOCs and GOCinCs have included (with dates of service):
General Officer Commanding Northern District

- 1793–1795: General Sir William Howe
- 1796–1802: General the Duke of Gloucester and Edinburgh
- 1802–1806: Lieutenant-General Sir Hew Dalrymple
- 1807–1809: Lieutenant-General Sir David Dundas

Note: between 1810 and 1812 England was divided into 15 Districts

- 1812–1814: Lieutenant-General Sir Charles Green
- 1814–1815: Lieutenant-General William Wynyard
- 1815–1816: Lieutenant-General Sir Lowry Cole
- 1816–1828: Lieutenant-General Sir John Byng
- 1828–1836: Major-General Sir Henry Bouverie
- 1836–1839: Major-General Sir Richard Jackson
- 1839–1841: Major-General Sir Charles Napier
- 1842: Major-General Sir William Gomm
- 1843–1849: Lieutenant General Sir Thomas Arbuthnot
- 1850–1855: Lieutenant General Lord Cathcart
- 1856–1859: Lieutenant General Sir Harry Smith
- 1859–1860: Lieutenant General Sir John Pennefather
- 1860–1865: Lieutenant General Sir George Weatherall (1 July 1860)
- 1865–1866: Lieutenant General Sir Sydney Cotton
- 1866–1871: Major-General Sir John Garvock (10 October 1866)
- 1871–1872: Major-General George Carey
- 1872–1874: Major-General Daniel Lysons
- 1874–1878: Lieutenant General Sir Henry Percival de Bathe (1 July 1874)
- 1878–1881: Major-General George Willis (1 April 1878)
- 1881–1884: Major-General William Cameron
- 1884–1886: Lieutenant General Frederick Willis
- 1886–1889: Major-General Charles Daniell
- 1889: Major-General Nathaniel Stevenson

In 1889 Northern District was divided into North Eastern District and North Western District.
General Officer Commanding North Eastern District

- 1889–1891: Major-General Nathaniel Stevenson
- 1891–1894: Lieutenant-General Henry Wilkinson
- 1894–1902: Major-General Sir Reginald Thynne
- 1902–1903: Brigadier-General Edward Stevenson Browne
- 1903–1905: Major-General Sir Leslie Rundle

General Officer Commanding-in-Chief Northern Command

- 1905–1907 Lieutenant General Sir Leslie Rundle (acting 10 November 1903)
- 1907–1911 Lieutenant General Sir Laurence Oliphant (10 November 1907)
- 1911–1914 Lieutenant General Sir Herbert Plumer (10 November 1911)
- 1915–1916 Lieutenant General Sir Henry Lawson (temporary 1 January 1915)
- 1916–1919 Lieutenant General Sir John Maxwell (temporary 27 April 1916; substantive 1 November 1916)
- 1919–1923 Lieutenant General Sir Ivor Maxse (1 June 1919)
- 1923–1927 Lieutenant General Sir Charles Harington (1 November 1923)
- 1927–1931 Lieutenant General Sir Cameron Shute (15 May 1927)
- 1931–1933 Lieutenant General Sir Francis Gathorne-Hardy (15 May 1931)
- 1933–1937 Lieutenant General Sir Alexander Wardrop (17 October 1933)
- 1937–1940 Lieutenant General Sir William Bartholomew (12 October 1937)
- 1940–1941 Lieutenant General Sir Ronald Forbes Adam (8 June 1940)
- 1941–1944 Lieutenant General Sir Ralph Eastwood (3 June 1941)
- 1944–1946 Lieutenant General Sir Edwin Morris (7 June 1944)
- 1946–1947 Lieutenant General Sir Philip Christison (27 February 1946)
- 1947–1949 Lieutenant General Sir Montagu Stopford (6 March 1947)
- 1949–1953 Lieutenant General Sir Philip Balfour (21 March 1949)
- 1953–1957 Lieutenant General Sir Geoffrey Evans (7 May 1953)
- 1957–1960 Lieutenant General Sir Richard Goodbody (8 May 1957)
- 1960–1962 Lieutenant General Sir Michael West (11 May 1960)
- 1962–1963 Lieutenant General Sir Charles Jones (1 June 1962)
- 1963–1964 Lieutenant General Sir Charles Richardson
- 1964–1967 Lieutenant General Sir Geoffrey Musson (1 December 1964)
- 1967–1969 Lieutenant General Sir Walter Walker (3 October 1967)
- 1969–1970 Lieutenant General Sir Cecil Blacker (1 June 1969)
- 1970–1972 Lieutenant General Sir William Jackson (10 October 1970)

== Sources ==
- Adolphus, John (1818). The political state of the British empire, containing a general view of the domestic and foreign possessions of the crown. Vol. 2. T. Cadell and W. Davies.
- Forty, George (2013) [1998]. Companion to the British Army 1939–1945 (ePub ed.). New York: Spellmount. ISBN 978-0-7509-5139-5.
- Fewster, Joseph (2011). The Keelmen of Tyneside: Labour Organisation and Conflict in the North-East Coal Industry, 1600-1830. Boydell Press. ISBN 9781843836322.
- Joslen, H. F. (2003) [1960]. Orders of Battle: Second World War, 1939–1945. Uckfield, East Sussex: Naval and Military Press. ISBN 978-1-84342-474-1.
