= Valentine McMaster =

Recipient of the Victoria Cross

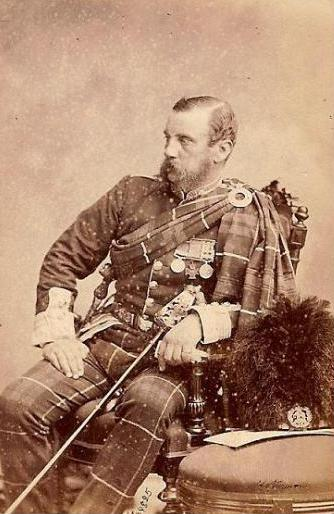
- Born: 16 May 1834; Trichinopoly, British India
- Died: 22 January 1872 (aged 37); Belfast, Ireland
- Burial place: Belfast City Cemetery
- Military career
- Allegiance: United Kingdom
- Branch: British Army
- Service years: 1855–1872
- Rank: Surgeon
- Units: 78th Highlanders; 6th (Inniskilling) Dragoons; 18th Hussars
- Conflicts: Anglo-Persian War; Indian Mutiny
- Awards: Victoria Cross

Surgeon Valentine Munbee McMaster VC (16 May 1834 – 22 January 1872) was a recipient of the Victoria Cross, the highest and most prestigious award for gallantry in the face of the enemy that can be awarded to British and Commonwealth forces.

== Life ==
McMaster was born in Tiruchirappalli in India and later graduated from the University of Edinburgh Medical School with an MD.

He entered the army as an assistant surgeon in March 1855 and joined the 78th Highlanders, serving in the Persian War in 1857, before returning with the regiment to India at the beginning of the Indian Mutiny. Here, the 78th joined General Havelock’s column that advanced to relieve the siege of Lucknow.

=== VC action ===
McMaster was a 23 years old assistant surgeon in the 78th (Highlanders) Regiment of Foot (later The Seaforth Highlanders) during the Indian Mutiny when the following deed took place on 25 September 1857, at the first relief of Lucknow for which he was awarded the VC:

For the intrepidity with which he exposed himself to the fire of the enemy, in bringing in, and attending to, the wounded, on the 25th of September, at Lucknow. (Extract from Field Force Orders of the late Major-General Havelock, dated 17 October 1857.)

McMaster was presented with his cross by Lieutenant General Henry Somerset in Bombay later that year. McMaster was awarded one of the eight VCs to the 78th Regiment for the Indian Mutiny. None of the awards to the 78th Regiment and no awards to Medical Officers during the Indian Mutiny were recommended under the ballot method provided in Clause 13 of the Victoria Cross Warrant.

=== Later years ===
In September 1860 McMaster transferred from the 78th Highlanders to be assistant surgeon of the 6th (Inniskilling) Dragoons, moving to the 18th Hussars in June 1864. Promoted to the rank of staff-surgeon in March 1868, he returned to the 78th Highlanders in March 1869. The same year, the 78th were posted to Halifax, Nova Scotia, where McMaster married Eleanor Burmester in June 1870. They had a daughter and son, one born after McMaster's death. In November 1871 the 78th moved to Belfast where, on 22 January 1872, McMaster died of heart disease aged 37. He was buried in Belfast City Cemetery. There is a memorial to his memory in St. Columb's Cathedral in Derry.

McMaster's widow Eleanor returned to Canada, where she married Canadian surgeon Campbell Mellis Douglas, who had won the VC in the 1867 Andaman Islands expedition.

== The medal ==
His Victoria Cross is displayed at the National War Museum of Scotland in Edinburgh Castle.
