= Regimental Museum of The Royal Welsh =

Military museum in Powys, Wales

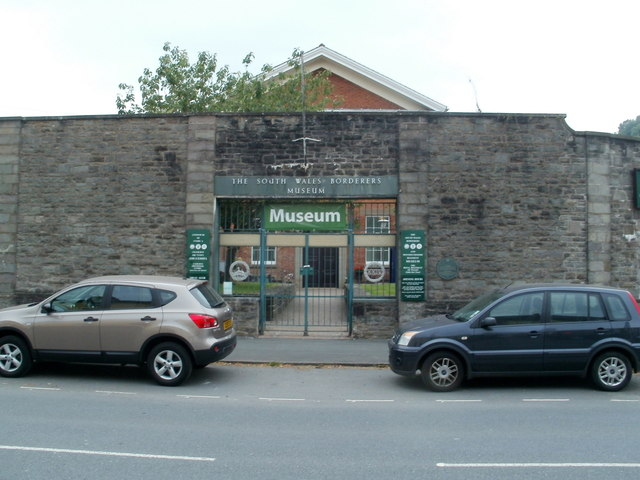
- Regimental Museum of The Royal Welsh

- Museum location in Powys, Wales
- Established: 1935
- Location: Brecon, Powys, Wales
- Coordinates: 51.9446°N 3.3838°W
- Type: Military museum
- Website: royalwelshmuseum.wales/south-wales-borderers/

The Regimental Museum of The Royal Welsh, formerly the South Wales Borderers Museum, is located at Brecon in Wales. The museum's collection is made up of artefacts collected from a variety of sources from around the world and which display the regiment's 300-year history.

== History ==
The collection was opened to the public as the South Wales Borderers Museum in 1935. Memorial gates were unveiled at the museum in memory of Colonel Courtney Trower, who commanded the 5th (Service) Battalion during the First World War, in September 1967 and the Prince of Wales visited the museum in October 1973. Following the formation of the Royal Welsh in 2006, the museum changed its name to the Regimental Museum of The Royal Welsh.

== The collection ==
The museum is based at The Barracks, Brecon, South Wales, and claims to have the finest collection of weapons to be found in any regimental museum in the United Kingdom. Its collection of guns shows the development of soldiers' weapons from the 18th century to the present.

The museum's Medal Room contains about 3,000 medals. The Victoria Cross case in the main hall contains sixteen replica VCs which represent the originals which are owned by the regiment but which cannot be displayed because they are too valuable. The museum's greatest attraction is its Zulu War Room, which displays the exploits of the 24th Regiment of Foot during the 1879 Anglo-Zulu War made famous by the 1964 film Zulu, for action during the campaign the Regiment was awarded 11 VCs. Queen Victoria called the soldiers of the 24th Foot "The Noble 24th".

The museum has an extensive archive which in particular relates to the Zulu War of 1879. Access to the archive collection is available to bona fide researchers by appointment. The museum also has an excellent collection of pictures, paintings, dioramas, drums, assegais, ammunition, buttons, badges and uniforms.

== Victoria Crosses held by the museum ==
The museum holds the Victoria Crosses awarded to the following members of the regiment:

- Sergeant William Wilson Allen, 24th Regiment (Rorke's Drift)
- Private David Bell, 24th Regiment (Andaman Islands expedition)
- Major Gonville Bromhead, 24th Regiment (Rorke's Drift)
- Brigadier General Edward Stevenson Browne, 24th Regiment (Hlobane)
- General Sir Alexander Cobbe, Indian Army; attached to the King's African Rifles (Second Boer War)
- Lieutenant Neville Josiah Coghill, 24th Regiment (Isandhlwana)
- Private William Griffiths, 24th Regiment (Andaman Islands expedition)
- Private Frederick Hitch 24th Regiment (Rorke's Drift)
- Sergeant Alfred Henry Hook, 24th Regiment (Rorke's Drift)
- Major General Dudley Graham Johnson, South Wales Borderers attached to the 2nd Battalion, Royal Sussex Regiment (First World War)
- Private William Jones, 24th Regiment (Rorke's Drift)
- Lieutenant Teignmouth Melvill, 24th Regiment (Isandhlwana)
- Company Sergeant Major Ivor Rees, 11th Battalion, South Wales Borderers (First World War)
- Sergeant John Williams, 24th Regiment (Rorke's Drift)
- Warrant Officer II John Henry Williams, 10th Battalion, South Wales Borderers (First World War)
