= James Cooper (VC) =

English recipient of the Victoria Cross (1840–1889)

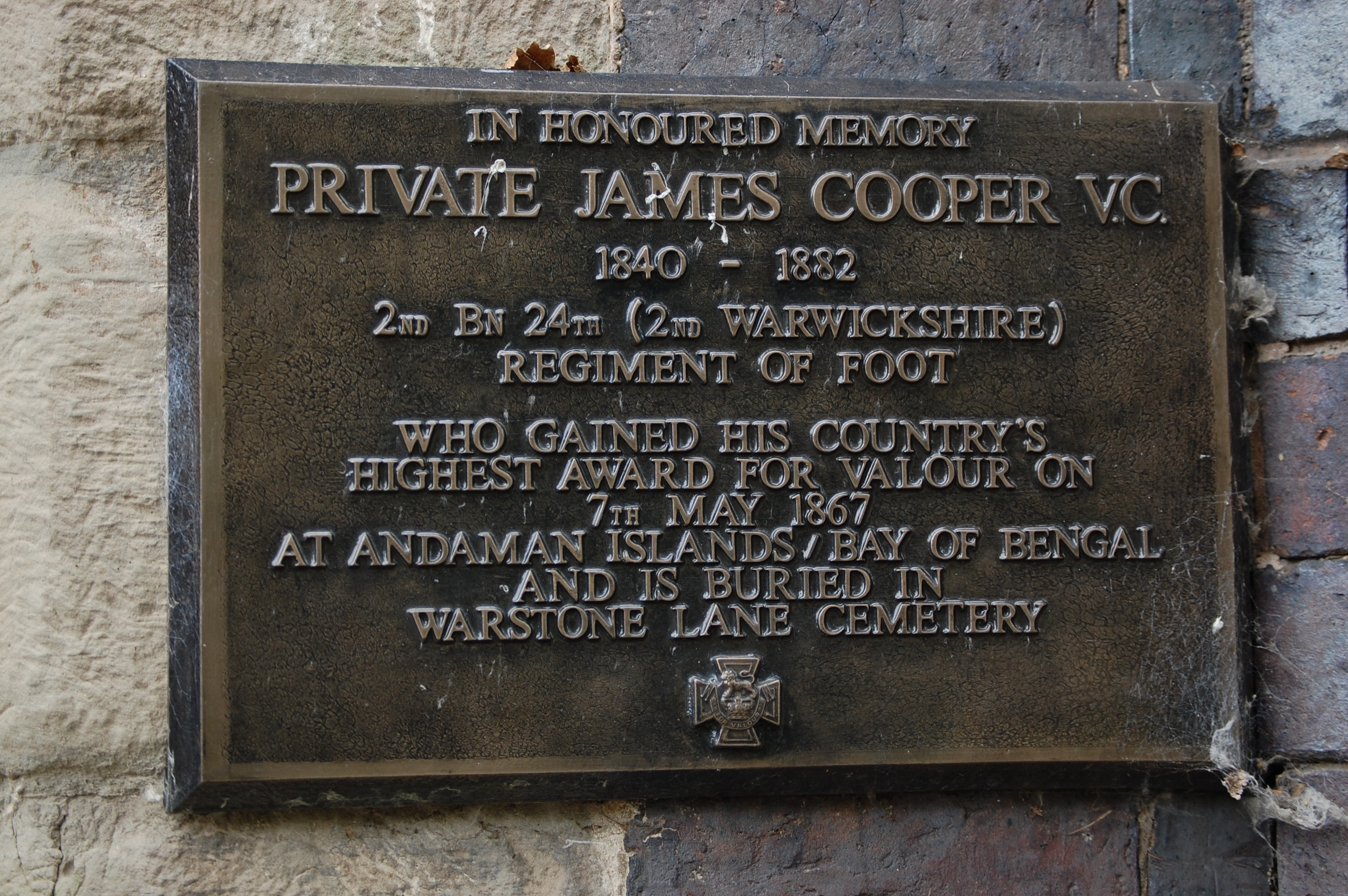
- Memorial plaque at Warstone Lane Cemetery
- Born: September 1840; Birmingham, England
- Died: 9 August 1889 (aged 48); Birmingham
- Burial place: Warstone Lane Cemetery
- Military career
- Allegiance: United Kingdom
- Branch: British Army
- Rank: Private
- Units: 24th Regiment of Foot
- Conflicts: Andaman Islands Expedition
- Awards: Victoria Cross

James Cooper VC (September 1840 – 9 August 1889) was an English recipient of the Victoria Cross, the highest and most prestigious award for gallantry in the face of the enemy that can be awarded to British and Commonwealth forces.

== Details ==
Cooper was about 27 years old and a private in the 2nd Battalion, 24th Regiment of Foot (later The South Wales Borderers), British Army during the Andaman Islands Expedition. The Cross was not awarded for bravery in action against the enemy, but for bravery at sea in saving life in a storm off the Andaman Islands.

On 7 May 1867 at the island of Little Andaman, eastern India, in the Bay of Bengal, Private Cooper was one of a party of five (David Bell, Campbell Mellis Douglas, William Griffiths, Thomas Murphy) of 2/24th Regiment. They risked their lives in manning a boat and proceeding through dangerous surf to rescue some of their comrades who had been sent to the island to find out the fate of the commander and seven of the crew, who had landed from the ship Assam Valley and were feared murdered by the cannibalistic islanders.

The citation was gazetted on 17 December 1867:

THE Queen has been graciously pleased to signify Her intention to confer the decoration of the Victoria Cross on the undermentioned Officer and Private Soldiers of Her Majesty's Army, whose claims to the same have been submitted for Her Majesty's approval, for their gallant conduct at the Little Andaman Island, as recorded against their names, viz. :—
2nd Battalion, 24th Regiment: Assistant-Surgeon Campbell Millis Douglas, M.D, Private Thomas Murphy, Private James Cooper, Private David Bell, Private William Griffiths.
For the very gallant and daring manner in which, on the 7th of May, 1867, they risked their lives in manning a boat and proceeding through a dangerous surf to the rescue of some of their comrades, who formed part of an expedition which had been sent to the Island of Little Andaman, by order of the Chief Commissioner of British Burmah, with the view of ascertaining the fate of the Commander and seven of the crew of the ship " Assam Valley," who had landed there, and were supposed to have been murdered by the natives.
The officer who commanded the troops on the occasion reports : About an hour later in the day Dr. Douglas, 2nd Battalion, 24th ."Regiment, and the four Privates referred" to, gallantly manning the second gig, made their way through the surf almost to the shore, but finding their boat was half filled with water, they retired. A second attempt made by Dr. Douglas and party proved successful, five of us being safely passed through the surf to the boats outside. A third and last trip got the whole of the party left on shore safe to the boats. It is stated that Dr. Douglas accomplished these trips through the surf to the shore by no ordinary exertion. He stood in the bows of the boat, and worked her in an intrepid and seamanlike manner, cool to a degree, as if what he was then doing was an ordinary act of every-day life. The four Privates behaved in an equally cool and collected manner, rowing through the roughest surf when the slightest hesitation or want of pluck on the part of any one of them would have been attended by the gravest results. It is reported that seventeen officers and men were thus saved from what must otherwise have been a fearful risk, if not certainty of death.

Cooper is buried at Warstone Lane Cemetery, in Birmingham.
