= Thomas Murphy (VC) =

Recipient of the Victoria Cross

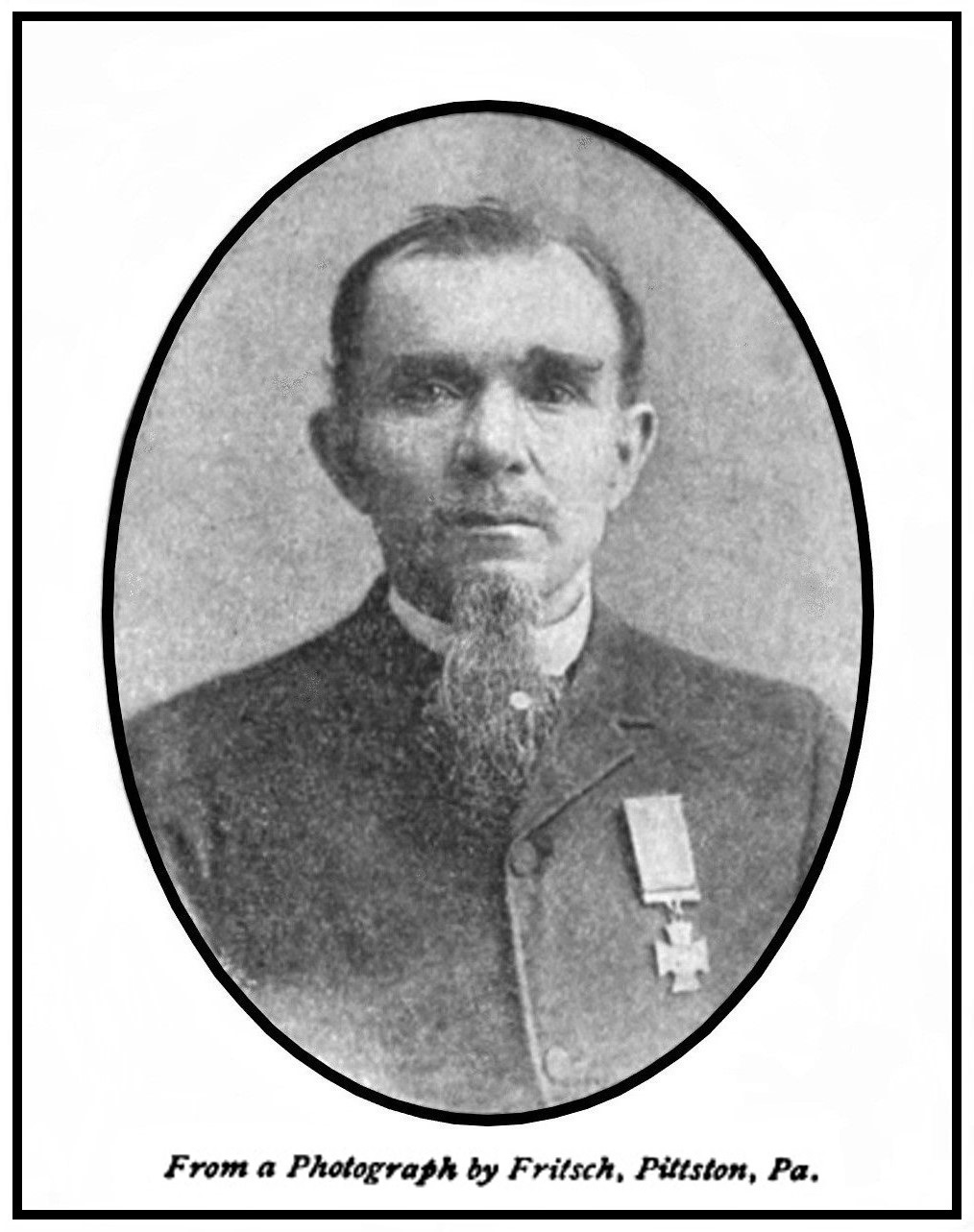
- Thomas Murphy VC portrait, Charles Fritsch Studio, Pittston, PA, from page 194 of the book Heroes of the Victoria Cross by T. E. Toomey, London, 1895
- Born: 1832; Dublin, Ireland
- Died: 22 March 1900; Pittston, Pennsylvania
- Burial place: St John the Evangelist Cemetery, Pittston, Pennsylvania
- Military career
- Allegiance: United Kingdom
- Branch: British Army
- Rank: Private
- Units: 2nd Battalion, 24th Regiment of Foot
- Conflicts: Andaman Islands Expedition
- Awards: Victoria Cross

Thomas Murphy VC true name Thomas Cosgrove (1832 – 22 March 1900) was an Irish recipient of the Victoria Cross, the highest and most prestigious award for gallantry in the face of the enemy that can be awarded to British and Commonwealth forces.

== Details ==
Victoria Cross Medal without Bar

The Cross was awarded not for bravery in action against the enemy, but for bravery at sea in saving life in a storm off Andaman Islands. Born in Dublin, he was about 28 years old and a private in the 2nd Battalion, 24th Regiment of Foot (later The South Wales Borderers), British Army during the Andaman Islands Expedition when the following deed took place for which he was awarded the VC.

On 7 May 1867 at the island of Little Andaman, eastern India, in the Bay of Bengal, Private Murphy was one of a party of five (David Bell, James Cooper, Campbell Mellis Douglas and William Griffiths) of the 2/24th Regiment, who risked their lives in manning a boat and proceeding through dangerous surf to rescue some of their comrades who had been sent to the island to find out the fate of the commander and seven of the crew, who had landed from the ship Assam Valley and were feared murdered by the cannibalistic islanders.

The citation was gazetted on 17 December 1867:

THE Queen has been graciously pleased to signify Her intention to confer the decoration of the Victoria Cross on the undermentioned Officer and Private Soldiers of Her Majesty's Army, whose claims to the same have been submitted for Her Majesty's approval, for their gallant conduct at the Little Andaman Island, as recorded against their names, viz. :—
2nd Battalion, 24th Regiment: Assistant-Surgeon Campbell Millis Douglas, M.D, Private Thomas Murphy, Private James Cooper, Private David Bell, Private William Griffiths.
For the very gallant and daring manner in which, on the 7th of May, 1867, they risked their lives in manning a boat and proceeding through a dangerous surf to the rescue of some of their comrades, who formed part of an expedition which had been sent to the Island of Little Andaman, by order of the Chief Commissioner of British Burmah, with the view of ascertaining the fate of the Commander and seven of the crew of the ship " Assam Valley," who had landed there, and were supposed to have been murdered by the natives.
The officer who commanded the troops on the occasion reports : About an hour later in the day Dr. Douglas, 2nd Battalion, 24th ."Regiment, and the four Privates referred" to, gallantly manning the second gig, made their way through the surf almost to the shore, but finding their boat was half filled with water, they retired. A second attempt made by Dr. Douglas and party proved successful, five of us being safely passed through the surf to the boats outside. A third and last trip got the whole of the party left on shore safe to the boats. It is stated that Dr. Douglas accomplished these trips through the surf to the shore by no ordinary exertion. He stood in the bows of the boat, and worked her in an intrepid and seamanlike manner, cool to a degree, as if what he was then doing was an ordinary act of every-day life. The four Privates behaved in an equally cool and collected manner, rowing through the roughest surf when the slightest hesitation or want of pluck on the part of any one of them would have been attended by the gravest results. It is reported that seventeen officers and men were thus saved from what must otherwise have been a fearful risk, if not certainty of death.

== Later life, death and burial ==
Thomas Murphy VC was long thought to have died in Philadelphia, PA and was buried in either Holy Cross Cemetery (Yeadon, Pennsylvania) or Laurel Hill Cemetery in Philadelphia, PA. Research by US Medal of Honor researcher Karl Jensen and Canada Victoria Cross researcher William Mullen has proven that these two burial locations are incorrect. Documents below support the correct death place, burial location and true name of Thomas Murphy VC.

Thomas Murphy VC, whose true name was Thomas Cosgrove, emigrated to the United States after his military service. He had used his mother's maiden name of Murphy as an alias. He lived in Pittston, Pennsylvania and had work as a coal miner. He married on 1 Feb 1886 a widow Catherine (née Lynch) Dougherty in Pittston, PA. Catherine's first husband James Dougherty had died in a mining accident on 22 May 1882. James and Catherine had four children Patrick, Michael, Anna and Catherine. Thomas Cosgrove, Catherine and the four now step children all resided at 133 John St. in Pittston, Pennsylvania next to the Market Street Cemetery, which is now known as St. John the Evangelist Cemetery. Cosgrove died 22 Mar 1900 at Pittston, Pennsylvania and was buried in St. John the Evangelist Cemetery. His exact burial location is not known due to a fire had destroyed cemetery burial records pre-1936. He is perhaps buried with his widow Catherine, who died in 1927, in a Dougherty family plot in Old Section 4, Avenue 46 or nearby.

Thomas Cosgrove's obituary in the 23 Mar 1900 Wilkes-Barre, PA Daily News newspaper front page read:

WORE VICTORIA CROSS. - HE WON IT BY HIS BRAVERY - DIED AT PITTSTON. Thomas Cosgrove died at 3 o'clock yesterday morning at his home on Liberty Hill. Mr. Cosgrove for thirty years had been a resident of Pittston. He was a man with an extraordinary record, as the following will show: In I859, although he was but 16 years of age, he ran away from home and joined the British army under the assumed name of Thomas Murphy. He entered Co. H, 24th Regiment, British Infantry. In 1867 the regiment, stationed at Burmah, India, of which Mr. Cosgrove was a member, was ordered to investigate the wrecking of a trading vessel near the South Andaman Islands, on the Malay coast. Some of the officers and crew escaped to the shore and were captured by savages. These islands were also thought to be the nest of a band of pirates. One of the small boats which was conveying the soldiers from a warship was overturned by the rough sea. Fourteen of the occupants of the boat swam to shore, but were captured by the savages. They were taken to the interior of the island. Mr. Cosgrove, with five comrades, after a heroic effort, rescued them from the island. The rescuing party were surrounded by many wild savages, armed with arrows, which they used to excellent advantage. Mr. Cosgrove was struck twice in the leg and in the forehead. It was a heroics rescue. In the same year a Victoria Cross was awarded to Mr. Cosgrove and his five companions. The deceased was probably the only one in this section of the country who had such an honor. In his death Pittston has lost a good citizen and home a good father. He had been ill for about three years and had been in a very feeble condition for some time past. The deceased was a member of Branch 72, E. B. A., and Division 15, A. 0. H. He is survived by his wife and the following step-children: Patrick, Michael, Annie and Katie Dougherty, living at home. The funeral will take place Sunday afternoon at 2:30 o'clock, with interment in Market street cemetery.

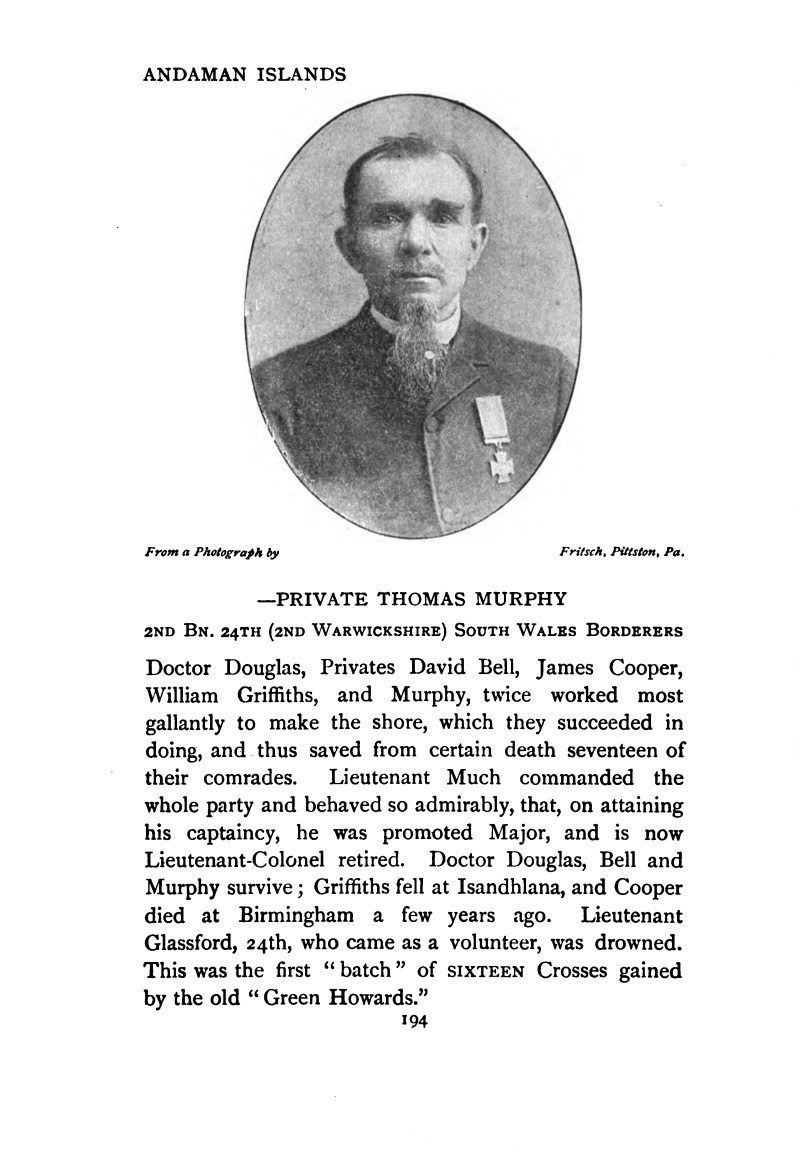
Thomas Murphy VC portrait, Charles Fritsch Studio, Pittston, PA, full page 194 from the book Heroes of the Victoria Cross by T. E. Toomey, London, 1895

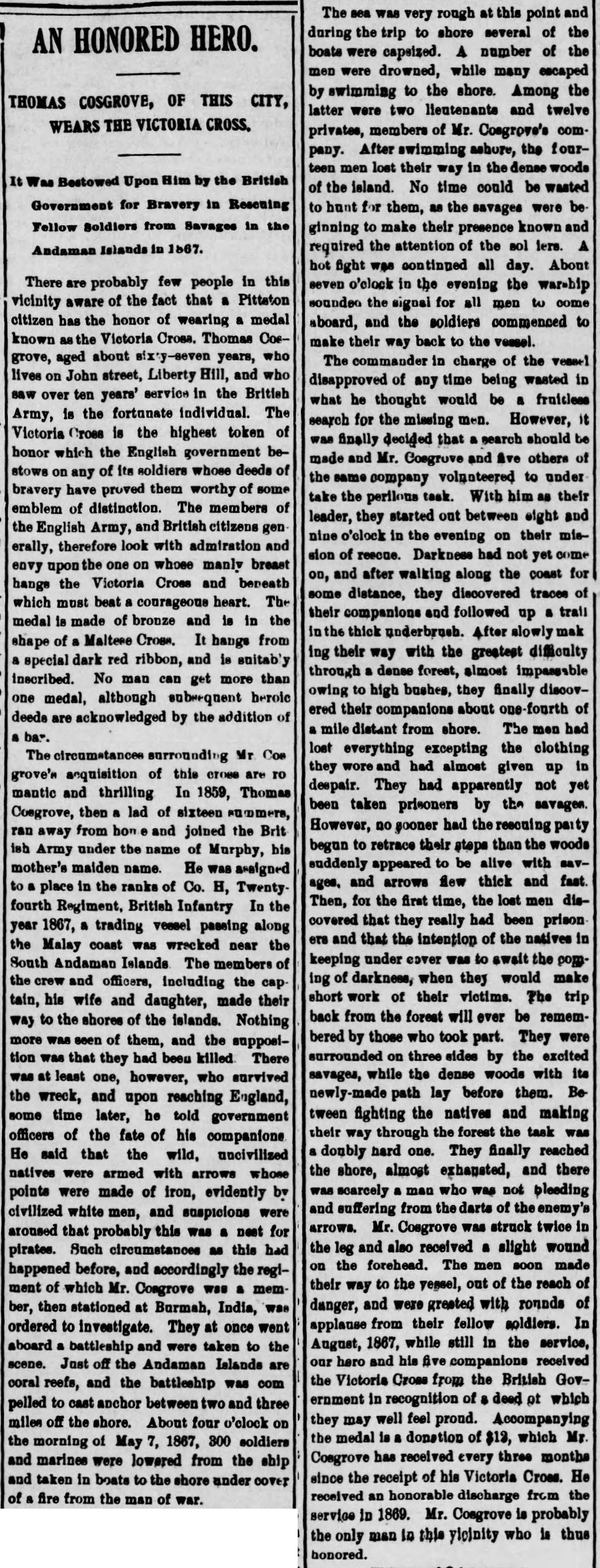
Thomas Murphy VC aka Thomas Cosgrove article, 9 Feb 1900 Pittston, Pa Gazette newspaper, page 4

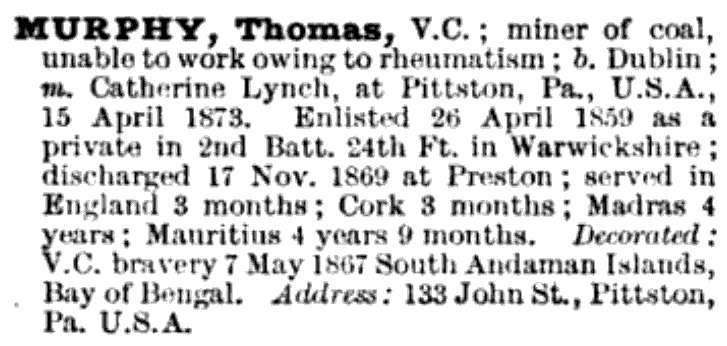
Thomas Murphy VC short bio listing from the Who's who: An Annual Biographical Dictionary, Volume 52, Adam and Charles Black, Soho Square, London, 1900, marriage date in incorrect

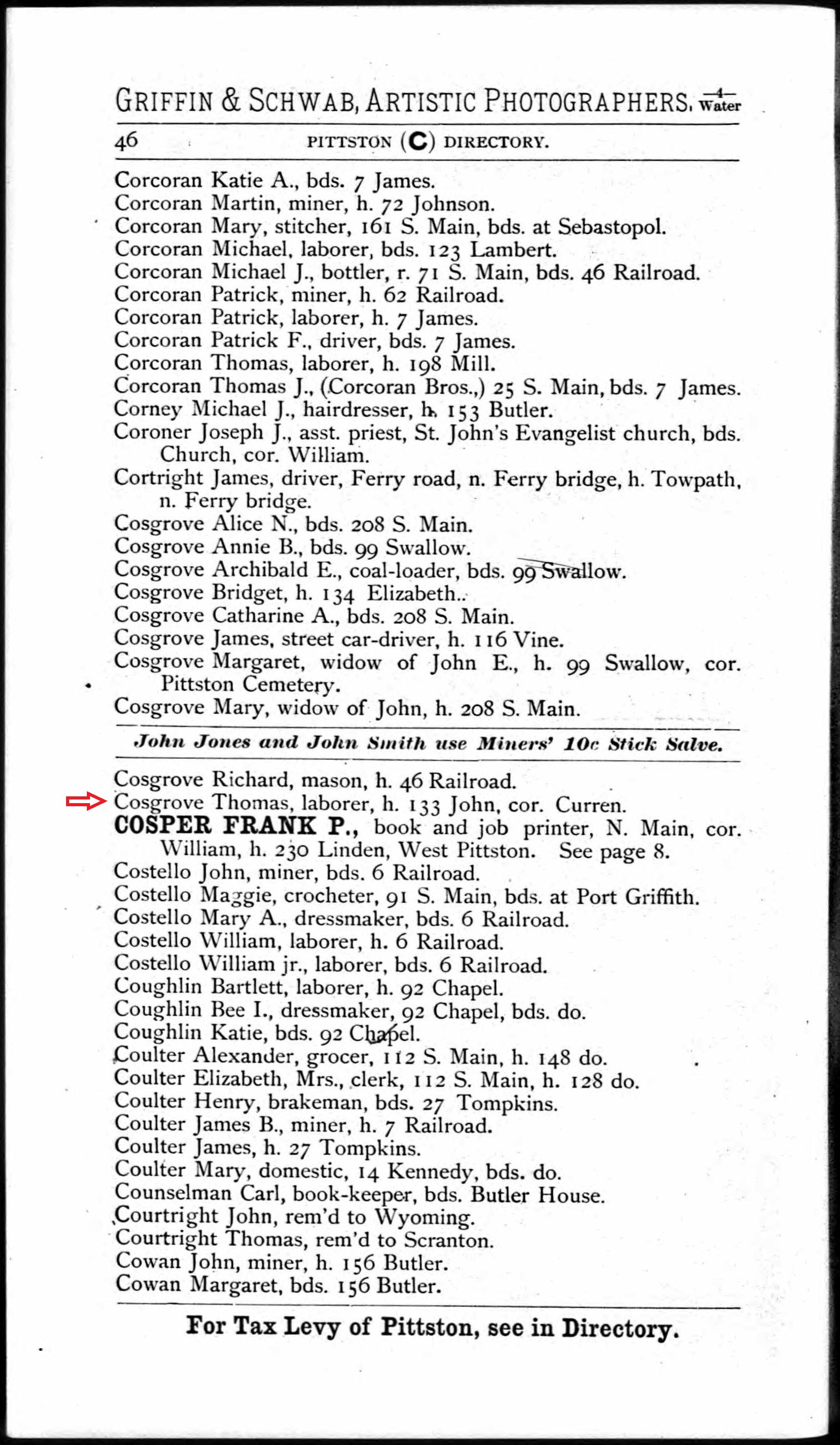
Thomas Murphy VC aka Thomas Cosgrove residing at 133 John St corner of Curren St, 1888 Pittston, PA City Directory

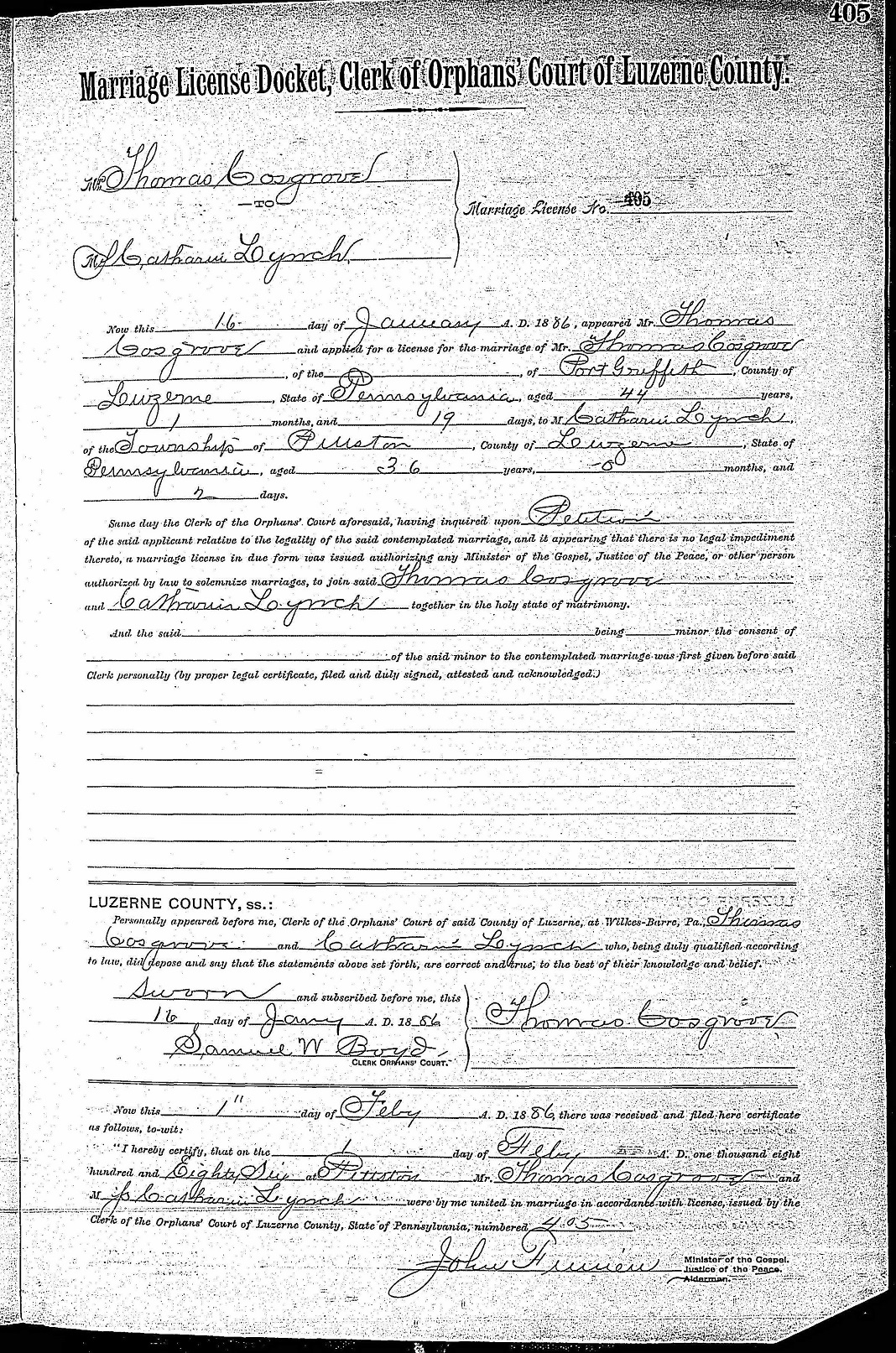
Thomas Murphy VC aka Thomas Cosgrove to Catherine (née Lynch) marriage, 1 Feb 1886 Luzerne County, PA Marriage Record
