= Campbell Mellis Douglas =

Recipient of the Victoria Cross

Campbell Mellis Douglas VC
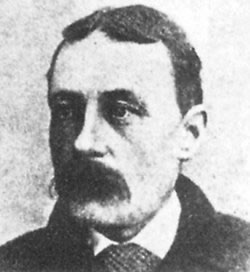
- Born: 5 August 1840; Quebec City, Quebec, Canada
- Died: 31 December 1909 (aged 69); Wells, Somerset, United Kingdom
- Military career
- Allegiance: Canada
- Branch: British Army
- Service years: 1862–1882
- Rank: Lieutenant Colonel
- Units: 2nd Battalion, 24th Regiment of Foot
- Conflicts: Andaman Islands Expedition North-West Rebellion
- Awards: Victoria Cross

Campbell Mellis Douglas VC (5 August 1840, in Quebec City – 31 December 1909), was a Canadian recipient of the Victoria Cross, the highest and most prestigious award for gallantry in the face of the enemy that can be awarded to British and Commonwealth forces. The awarding of the VC to Douglas was one of the few (only six in number) instances of the VC being awarded for actions taken not in the face of the enemy. (Another instance with a Canadian connection was the awarding of the VC to Timothy O'Hea (an Irishman serving in the British army) for actions taken at Danville, Quebec in 1866 relating to Canada's defence against Fenian raids.)

Douglas joined the British Army in 1862.

== Details ==
Douglas was born in Quebec City to Dr. George Mellis Douglas and Charlotte Campbell. His father was a prominent doctor in Quebec and served as a Surgeon with the Royal Quebec Volunteers and Eastern Townships Loyal Militia during the Rebellions of 1837–38. His maternal grandfather was Archibald Campbell and his brother was Admiral Archibald Lucius Douglas.

Campbell Mellis Douglas graduated from the University of Edinburgh Medical School with an MD degree in 1861. He was 26 years old, and an assistant surgeon in the 2nd Battalion, 24th Regiment of Foot (later The South Wales Borderers), British Army during the Andaman Islands Expedition when the following deed took place for which he was awarded the VC.

VC not awarded for bravery in action against the enemy, but for bravery at sea in saving life in storm off Andaman Islands. On 7 May 1867 at the island of Little Andaman, eastern India, in the Bay of Bengal, Assistant Surgeon Douglas and four Privates (David Bell, James Cooper, William Griffiths and Thomas Murphy) of the 2/24th Regiment risked their lives in manning a boat and proceeding through dangerous surf to rescue some of their comrades who had been sent to the island to find out the fate of the commander and seven of the crew, who had landed from the ship Assam Valley and were feared murdered by the cannibalistic islanders.

The citation was gazetted on 17 December 1867:

THE Queen has been graciously pleased to signify Her intention to confer the decoration of the Victoria Cross on the undermentioned Officer and Private Soldiers of Her Majesty's Army, whose claims to the same have been submitted for Her Majesty's approval, for their gallant conduct at the Little Andaman Island, as recorded against their names, viz. :—
2nd Battalion, 24th Regiment: Assistant-Surgeon Campbell Millis Douglas, M.D, Private Thomas Murphy, Private James Cooper, Private David Bell, Private William Griffiths.
For the very gallant and daring manner in which, on the 7th of May, 1867, they risked their lives in manning a boat and proceeding through a dangerous surf to the rescue of some of their comrades, who formed part of an expedition which had been sent to the Island of Little Andaman, by order of the Chief Commissioner of British Burmah, with the view of ascertaining the fate of the Commander and seven of the crew of the ship " Assam Valley," who had landed there, and were supposed to have been murdered by the natives.
The officer who commanded the troops on the occasion reports : About an hour later in the day Dr. Douglas, 2nd Battalion, 24th ."Regiment, and the four Privates referred" to, gallantly manning the second gig, made their way through the surf almost to the shore, but finding their boat was half filled with water, they retired. A second attempt made by Dr. Douglas and party proved successful, five of us being safely passed through the surf to the boats outside. A third and last trip got the whole of the party left on shore safe to the boats. It is stated that Dr. Douglas accomplished these trips through the surf to the shore by no ordinary exertion. He stood in the bows of the boat, and worked her in an intrepid and seamanlike manner, cool to a degree, as if what he was then doing was an ordinary act of every-day life. The four Privates behaved in an equally cool and collected manner, rowing through the roughest surf when the slightest hesitation or want of pluck on the part of any one of them would have been attended by the gravest results. It is reported that seventeen officers and men were thus saved from what must otherwise have been a fearful risk, if not certainty of death.

== Later life ==
He later achieved the rank of lieutenant colonel, and served on the Northwest Frontier in India. He retired from the army in 1882 and settled in Lakefield, Ontario. He married the widow of Valentine Munbee McMaster VC. He was recruited for service as a medical officer during the North-West Rebellion in 1885, where he further distinguished himself, arriving in time to treat the wounded from the 3 May Battle of Fish Creek and caring for the soldiers wounded during the Battle of Batoche, on 14 May.

Campbell Mellis Douglas retired to England in 1894, and died at Hollington, Somerset, on 30 December 1909.

== Medal ==
His Victoria Cross is held in the collection of the Canadian War Museum (Ottawa, Ontario, Canada).
