= William Jones (VC) =

Recipient of the Victoria Cross (1839–1913)

William Jones VC
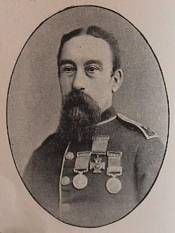
- Born: 16 August 1839; 5 Lucas Street, Castle Precincts, Bristol.
- Died: 15 April 1913 (aged 73–74); Manchester
- Burial place: [Philips Park Cemetery], Miles Platting, Manchester; 53°29′20.5″N 2°11′59″W
- Military career
- Branch: British Army
- Rank: Private
- Commands: 24th Regiment of Foot
- Conflicts: Anglo-Zulu War Battle of Rorke's Drift
- Awards: Victoria Cross; South Africa Medal

William Jones VC (1839 – 15 April 1913) was a British recipient of the Victoria Cross for his action at the Battle of Rorke's Drift in January 1879, the highest and most prestigious award for gallantry in the face of the enemy that can be awarded to British and Commonwealth forces.

== Early life ==
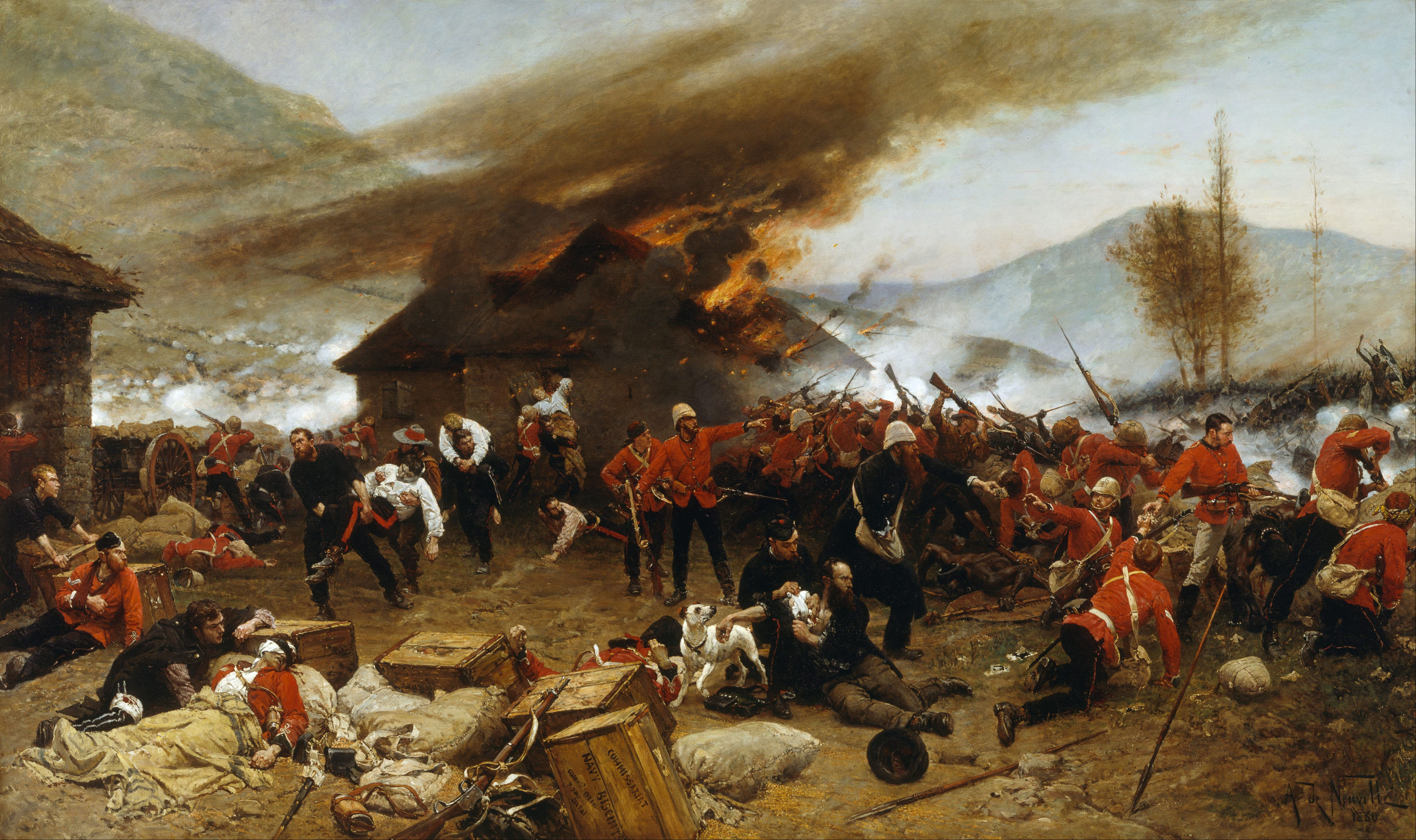
The "Defense of Rorke's Drift" by Adolph Alphonse de Neuville

Jones's attestation papers list him as being born at Evesham, Worcestershire. He may have been of the family of shoemakers by the name of Jones that lived in Cowl Street, Evesham, in the mid-1840s, but he was actually born on 16 August 1839 at 5 Lucas Street, Castle Precincts, Bristol. He was approximately 39 years old and a private in the British Army's 2nd Battalion, 24th Regiment of Foot (later The South Wales Borderers), during the Zulu War, when he was awarded the Victoria Cross for bravery in action.

On 23 January 1879 at Rorke's Drift, Natal, South Africa, Private 593 William Jones and Private 716 Robert Jones defended one of the wards in the field hospital, as described in their joint VC citation:

In another ward, facing the hill, Private William Jones and Private Robert Jones defended the post to the last, until six out of the seven patients it contained had been removed. The seventh, Sergeant Maxfield, 2nd Battalion 24th Regiment, was delirious from fever. Although they had previously dressed him, they were unable to induce him to move. When Private Robert Jones returned to endeavour to carry him away, he found him being stabbed by the Zulus as he lay on his bed.

== Later life ==
Jones was being treated at Netley Hospital for chronic rheumatism, which he claimed to have contracted from the cold and wet nights after Rorke's Drift; before being discharged on 2 January 1880 and on 13 January 1880, he received his award from Queen Victoria at Windsor Castle. Upon leaving the Army, he attempted to establish himself in Birmingham. Employment opportunities were few, but he managed to take part in a number of acting parts, including Hamilton's Pansterorama and in 1887 he eventually became a member of Buffalo Bill's Wild West Show.

Later, Jones moved to Rutland Street, Chorlton-on-Medlock, Manchester and in 1910 pawned his Victoria Cross, having fallen upon hard times. He was admitted to work in the workhouse on Bridge Street, Manchester. William was one of the few survivors of the battle to live into his 70s. He died on 15 April 1913 and was buried in a paupers grave in Philips Park Cemetery, Manchester (plot D-887 in the Church of England section). A large blue commemoration plaque adorned the wall of the disused church, alongside another plaque to commemorate World War I Victoria Cross recipient, George Stringer. New plaques have since been created near the war memorial.

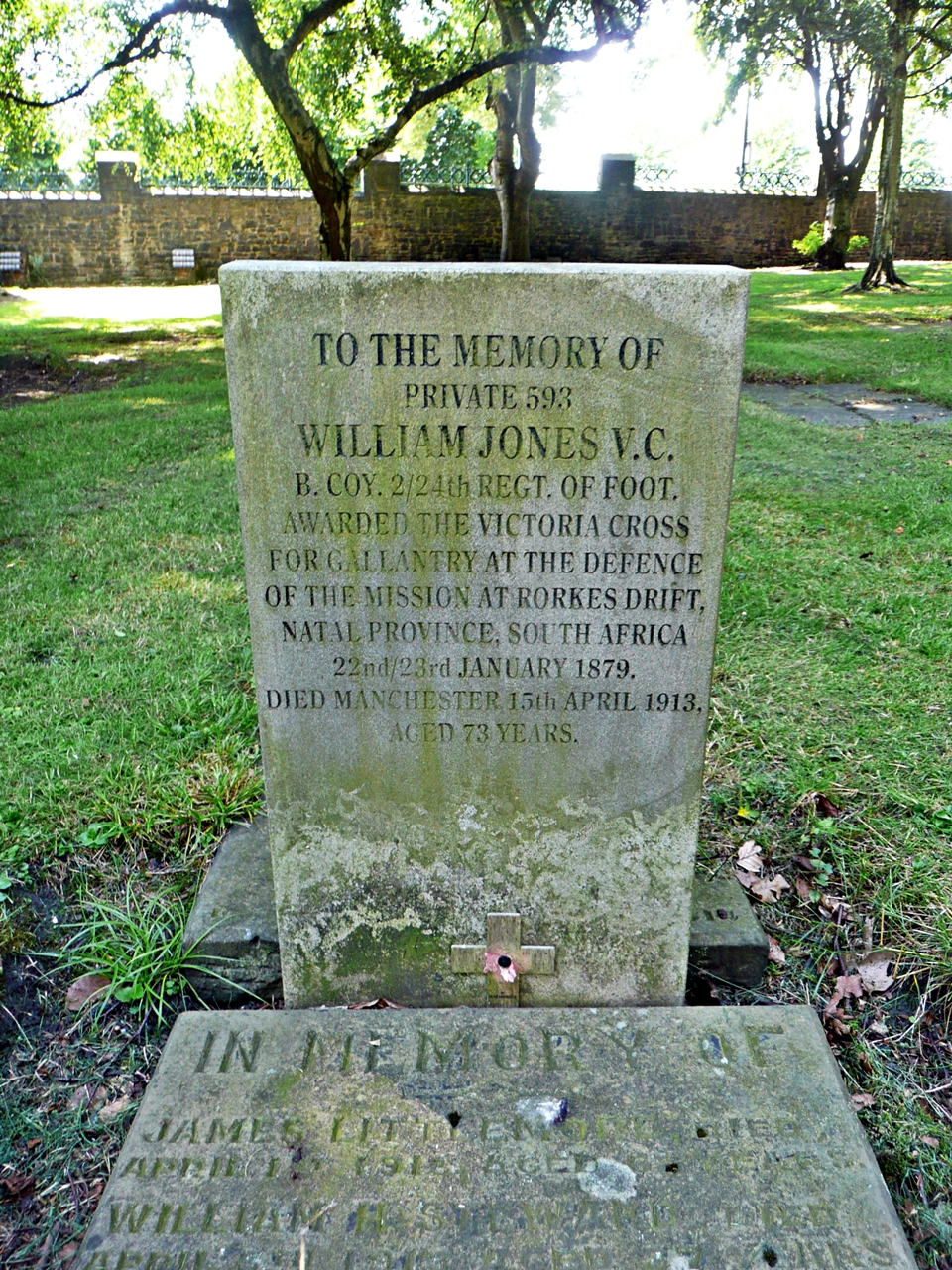
Grave of William Jones

After four years of campaigning, on 2 November 2007 a ceremony was held at Philip's Park Cemetery to celebrate the unveiling of a new headstone for the grave.

== The medal ==
Jones had to pawn his VC sometime in the 1890s, having fallen on hard times. It was sold for £110 at Glendining & Co's Auction Rooms on 28 June 1917. It was eventually brought to where it is now displayed, at the Regimental Museum of The Royal Welsh, Brecon, Powys, Wales.

== Legacy ==
In the 1964 film Zulu, Jones was portrayed by the actor Richard Davies.

Bearing the Cross was a Ken Blakeson play which looked into the lives of three soldiers who fought at Rorke's Drift. It was broadcast in 2008 and 2009 on BBC Radio 4 with Nigel Anthony as William Jones VC, Sebastian Harcombe as Robert Jones VC and Jon Strickland as Henry Hook VC. The play starts in 1887 at Buffalo Bill's Wild West Show in London, where the battle against the Zulus was restaged with Private William Jones VC as presenter.
