= Robert Jones (VC) =

Recipient of the Victoria Cross (1857–1898)

Robert Jones VC
- Born: 19 August 1857; Penrhos, Monmouthshire, Wales
- Died: 6 September 1898 (aged 41); Peterchurch, Herefordshire, England
- Burial place: St Peter's parish churchyard, Peterchurch; 52°2′29″N 2°57′22.5″W
- Military career
- Allegiance: United Kingdom
- Branch: British Army
- Rank: Private
- Units: 2nd Battalion, 24th Regiment of Foot
- Conflicts: Anglo-Zulu War Rorke's Drift
- Awards: Victoria Cross; South Africa Medal

Robert Jones VC (19 August 1857 – 6 September 1898) was a Welsh recipient of the Victoria Cross for his actions at the Battle of Rorke's Drift in January 1879, the highest and most prestigious award for gallantry in the face of the enemy that can be awarded to British and Commonwealth forces.

Jones was born at Penrhos, a hamlet to the north of Raglan in Monmouthshire, Wales.

== Military achievements ==
Jones, aged 21, was serving as a private in the 2nd Battalion, 24th Regiment of Foot (later The South Wales Borderers) of the British Army during the Anglo-Zulu War. At the Battle of Rorke's Drift, he and Private 593 William Jones were stationed in a hospital room facing the hill.

Despite overwhelming odds, the two maintained a steady rate of fire. While one soldier worked to cut a hole through the partition into the adjoining room, the other continued to fire at advancing Zulu warriors through the loopholed walls, alternating between his own and his comrade’s rifle as the barrels became too hot from continuous use.

By their combined efforts, the two men carried six patients to safety through the broken partition. A seventh, Sgt. Maxfield was delirious and refused to be helped. When Robert Jones returned to take Maxfield to safety by force, he found him in his bed being stabbed by Zulus. Robert Jones suffered four assegai spear wounds, was struck by a bullet, and had minor burns.

After the battle, General Sir Garnet Wolseley awarded Robert and William Jones the VC at Utrecht, Transvaal.

== Later life ==
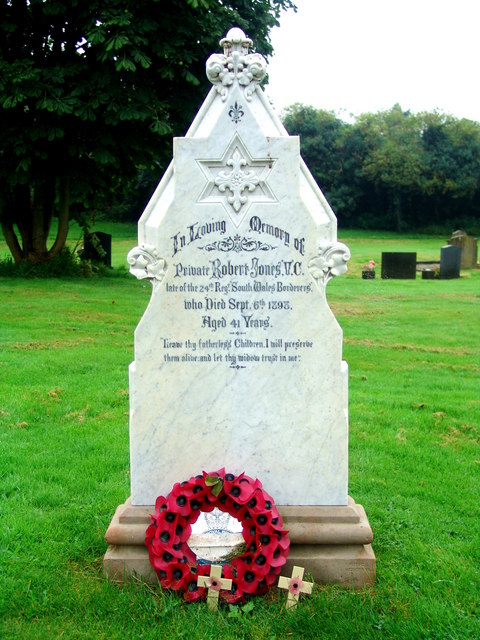
Jones' headstone at Peterchurch, Herefordshire

After leaving the army, Jones settled in Herefordshire where he became a farm labourer. He married Elizabeth Hopkins. They had five children: Robert Jones, jr, Edith Emily East (née Jones), Alice Smith (née Jones), Lily Rose Griffiths (née Jones), and Ellen Kelly (née Jones) called Nellie by the family.

In 1898 Jones died in Peterchurch, Herefordshire, from gunshot wounds to the head at the age of 41. He had borrowed his employer's shotgun to go crow-shooting. His death certificate records a verdict of suicide whilst being insane. The coroner heard that he was plagued by recurring nightmares arising from his desperate hand-to-hand combat with Zulus. Jones was buried at St Peter's Church. Instead of being carried through the church gates into the graveyard, his coffin was taken over the wall due to the stigma of the time in regards to suicide. Jones' headstone faces in the opposite direction (north) to the others of the time (which face south).

Jones' widow, Elizabeth, gave damning evidence at his inquest. She later married a William Tilbury, by whom she had two further children.

== Victoria Cross ==
Jones' Victoria Cross passed out of the family. In 1996 Lord Ashcroft bought it at auction for £80,000. It was on display in the Lord Ashcroft Gallery at the Imperial War Museum, London. Lord Ashcroft’s collection of Victoria Crosses and George Crosses now has a new home at the National Army Museum in Chelsea, London, with public displays rolling out through the summer of 2026.

Ashcroft outbid both the South Wales Borderers' regimental museum and members of Jones' family. Members of the family had approached the regimental museum but had been told the museum were not in a position to bid but the museum did bid for the medal, and without realising it, family members who wanted to buy the Victoria Cross and donate it to the regimental museum unwittingly ended up bidding against the museum.

== Film ==
In the 1964 film Zulu, actor Denys Graham played Jones.
