= Edward Stevenson Browne =

Recipient of the Victoria Cross

Brigadier-General Edward Stevenson Brown VC CB
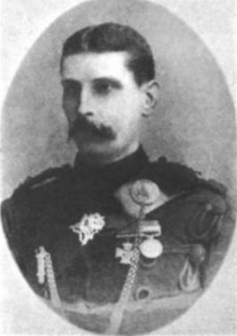
- Born: 23 December 1852; Cambridge, Cambridgeshire, England
- Died: 16 July 1907 (aged 54); Montreux, Switzerland
- Burial place: Clarens Cemetery, Montreux
- Military career
- Allegiance: United Kingdom
- Branch: British Army
- Rank: Brigadier-General
- Units: 24th Regiment of Foot; South Wales Borderers
- Conflicts: Anglo-Zulu War – Battle of Hlobane
- Awards: Victoria Cross; Order of the Bath

Brigadier-General Edward Stevenson Browne, VC, CB (23 December 1852 – 16 July 1907) was a British Army officer, and an English recipient of the Victoria Cross, the highest and most prestigious award for gallantry in the face of the enemy that can be awarded to British and Commonwealth forces.

== Early career ==
Browne was commissioned a second lieutenant in the 24th Regiment of Foot (later The South Wales Borderers) on 23 September 1871, and promoted to lieutenant on 28 October 1871.

== Victoria Cross details ==
He was 26 years old, and a lieutenant in the 1st Battalion, 24th Regiment of Foot during the Anglo-Zulu War when the following deed took place on 29 March 1879 at the battle of Hlobane, South Africa for which he was awarded the VC:

For his gallant conduct, on the 29th March, 1879, when the Mounted Infantry were being driven in by the enemy at Inhlobana, in galloping back and twice assisting on his horse (under heavy fire and within a few yards of the enemy) one of the mounted men, who must otherwise have fallen into the enemy's hands.

== Later career ==
Browne was promoted to captain on 19 May 1880, to major on 2 November 1885, to lieutenant-colonel on 8 April 1893, and to colonel on 8 April 1897. He was in command of the South Wales Borderers Regimental District until 4 March 1900, when he was appointed an Assistant Adjutant General of the North-Eastern District, stationed at York. He went on to be General Officer Commanding North Eastern District (with the temporary rank of brigadier-general) from 4 September 1902. On 10 November 1903 he was made a brigadier general on the staff and general officer commanding (GOC) of the 11th Infantry Brigade, part of the 2nd Army Corps, and was allowed to retain his temporary brigadier's rank whilst so employed.

retiring in November 1903 with the substantive rank of brigadier-general. He also commanded the West-Yorkshire Volunteer Brigade, and in December 1902 was appointed to the Honorary Colonelcy of the 2nd volunteer battalion (Bradford Rifles) of The Prince of Wales Own Regiment of Yorkshire.

He was placed on half-pay in November 1906.

== The medal ==
His Victoria Cross is displayed at the Regimental Museum of The Royal Welsh, Brecon, Powys, Wales.

Military offices
Preceded by Reginald Thynne	GOC North Eastern District; 1902–1903	Succeeded by Leslie Rundle
