= The Barracks, Brecon =

- Brecon
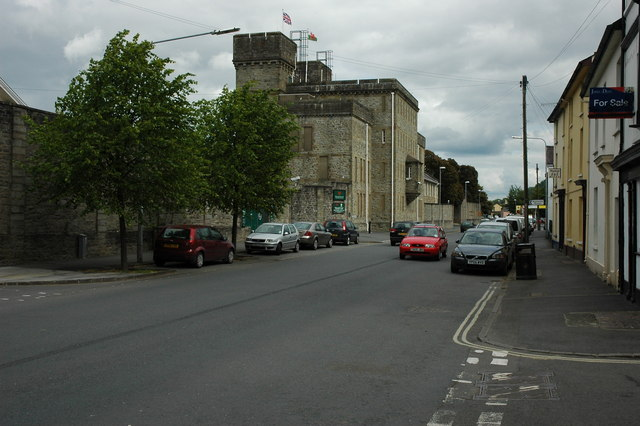
- The Barracks, Brecon

Site information
- Type: Barracks
- Owner: Ministry of Defence
- Operator: British Army

Location
- Location within Powys
- Coordinates: 51°56′40″N 03°23′02″W

Site history
- Built: 1805-1813
- Built for: War Office
- In use: 1813-Present

Garrison information
- Occupants: 160th (Wales) Brigade

The Barracks, Watton is a military installation in Brecon in Wales.

== History ==
The original barracks, which were constructed of red brick, were built at the Watton in 1805 and then extended in 1813.

In 1873, as part of the Cardwell Reforms (which encouraged the localisation of British military forces), the barracks became the depot for the two battalions of the 24th (2nd Warwickshire) Regiment of Foot, which began recruiting throughout South Wales. In the mid-1870s, troops from the barracks were despatched to the Cape Colony. During January 1879, the 24th Regiment became famed for its role at two momentous battles of the Anglo-Zulu War – Isandlwana and Rorke's Drift. That same year, a keep, for the storage of arms and ammunition, was added to the barracks.

Following the Childers Reforms, on 1 July 1881, the 24th Regiment was renamed the South Wales Borderers.

The South Wales Borderers Museum, now the Regimental Museum of The Royal Welsh, opened at the barracks in 1935. The barracks were designated as a regional seat of government in the Cold War.

Headquarters Wales was established at the barracks in 1972. In 1991, the first of the minor districts to be amalgamated were North West District, the former West Midlands District (by then Western District) and Wales, to form a new Wales and Western District. The enlarged district was disbanded on the formation of HQ Land Command in 1995.

The barracks are now the home of 160th (Wales) Brigade. In November 2016 the Ministry of Defence announced that the site would close in 2027. This decision was later scrapped under the Future Soldier reforms.

== Sources ==
- Tones, Theophilis (1909). History of Brecknockshire. Blissett, Davtes & Co.
