= Andaman Islands expedition =

1867 British expedition in the Bay of Bengal

The Andaman Islands expedition was a British expedition to the Andaman Islands in the Bay of Bengal, India. For actions during the expedition, five soldiers of the 24th Regiment of Foot were awarded Victoria Crosses. Campbell Mellis Douglas, David Bell, James Cooper, Thomas Murphy and William Griffiths risked their lives in manning a boat and proceeding through dangerous surf to rescue some of their comrades who had been sent to the island in order to locate the commander and seven of the crew from the ship Assam Valley who were feared murdered by "cannibalistic islanders"; the Onge tribesmen.

== Initial expedition ==
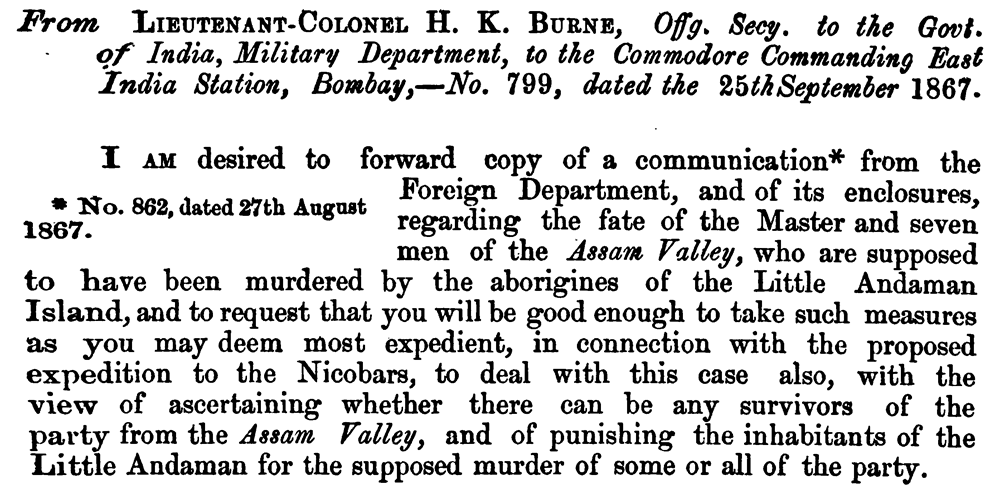
An official communication about the Assam Valley incident of 1867

The British in India had largely ignored the island of Little Andaman before 1867. On 21 March 1867 the captain and seven crew of the Assam Valley went ashore for wood and were seen to get over the reef at the southern tip of the island by the Assam Valley. They brought their boat ashore and went into the jungle. After not being seen for two days, the Assam Valley sailed to Rangoon to report the event.

This occurrence is termed the Assam Valley Incident and became the precursor event to the skirmishes that are sometimes referred to as the Onge Wars, in which dozens of Onge were killed. A ship was sent to Little Andaman but it returned without any success other than to report a piece of clothing, possibly a sailors cap, on the beach.

A few days later, the Kwang Tung, the station ship of Port Blair, was sent. It carried the British Officer in Charge of the Andamanese, Mr. Homfray, along with some local people to show the friendly intentions of the crew. Upon arrival, the party was attacked by native Onge people and retreated to their boats under covering fire, and then fled back to their waiting ship. The missing men were not located and this expedition was deemed a failure, so a larger expedition with a small military contingent was sent.

This party, again on the Kwang Tung, arrived on 6 May 1867, seven weeks after the initial disappearance. The Assam Valley was on the scene as well. Three boats were sent ashore, all coming under fire from the Onge. A skull, believed to be from the initial party, was found in the jungle, while four bodies were found decomposed on the beach. Although the Onge attempted to lure the landing party into the jungle, the soldiers stayed on the beach returning fire. When ammunition became low, the rescue boat was signalled, but it capsized on its way in, drowning a lieutenant.

== Rescue ==
Attempts to leave the island were thwarted by heavy surf and a lack of a working boat and other equipment. Two hundred Onge attacked but were repelled by the soldiers, freshly resupplied from ammunition coming in on the capsized rescue boat.

Eventually, a boat from the Assam Valley, guided and oared by Campbell Mellis Douglas, David Bell, James Cooper, Thomas Murphy and William Griffiths, performed a rescue of the stranded soldiers. Although swamped in the first attempt through the surf, the boat eventually made three trips through the surf, rescuing the entire party off the shore and returning them to the Kwang Tung.

=== Victoria Cross citation ===
The citation was gazetted on 17 December 1867:

THE Queen has been graciously pleased to signify Her intention to confer the decoration of the Victoria Cross on the undermentioned Officer and Private Soldiers of Her Majesty's Army, whose claims to the same have been submitted for Her Majesty's approval, for their gallant conduct at the Little Andaman Island, as recorded against their names, viz. :—
2nd Battalion, 24th Regiment: Assistant-Surgeon Campbell Millis Douglas, M.D, Private Thomas Murphy, Private James Cooper, Private David Bell, Private William Griffiths.
For the very gallant and daring manner in which, on the 7th of May, 1867, they risked their lives in manning a boat and proceeding through a dangerous surf to the rescue of some of their comrades, who formed part of an expedition which had been sent to the Island of Little Andaman, by order of the Chief Commissioner of British Burmah, with the view of ascertaining the fate of the Commander and seven of the crew of the ship " Assam Valley," who had landed there, and were supposed to have been murdered by the natives.
The officer who commanded the troops on the occasion reports : About an hour later in the day Dr. Douglas, 2nd Battalion, 24th ."Regiment, and the four Privates referred" to, gallantly manning the second gig, made their way through the surf almost to the shore, but finding their boat was half filled with water, they retired. A second attempt made by Dr. Douglas and party proved successful, five of us being safely passed through the surf to the boats outside. A third and last trip got the whole of the party left on shore safe to the boats. It is stated that Dr. Douglas accomplished these trips through the surf to the shore by no ordinary exertion. He stood in the bows of the boat, and worked her in an intrepid and seamanlike manner, cool to a degree, as if what he was then doing was an ordinary act of every-day life. The four Privates behaved in an equally cool and collected manner, rowing through the roughest surf when the slightest hesitation or want of pluck on the part of any one of them would have been attended by the gravest results. It is reported that seventeen officers and men were thus saved from what must otherwise have been a fearful risk, if not certainty of death.
