= South Wales Borderers =

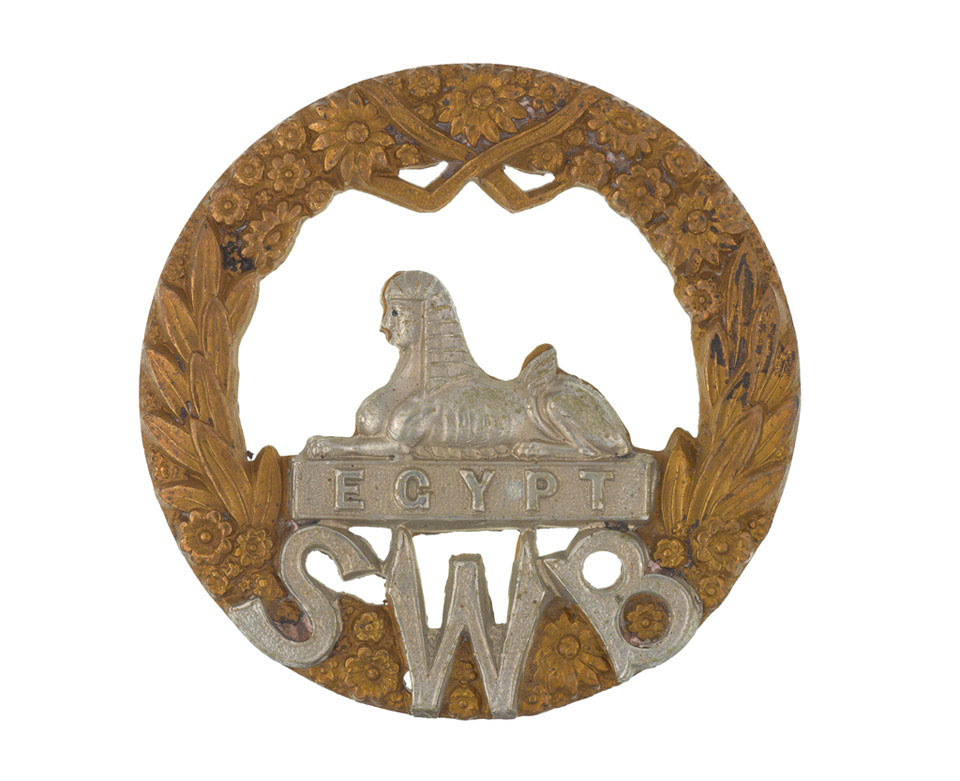
- c. 1896 regimental cap badge for other ranks
- Active: 1689–1969
- Country: England (1689–1707); Great Britain (1707–1800); United Kingdom (1801–1969)
- Branch: English Army; British Army
- Type: Infantry
- Role: Line infantry
- Garrison/HQ: The Barracks, Brecon
- Nickname: Howard's Greens
- March: Men of Harlech
- Anniversaries: Rorke's Drift (22 January)

Commanders
- Ceremonial chief: King Edward VIII

The South Wales Borderers was a line infantry regiment of the English and British armies. It was raised in 1689 as Sir Edward Dering's Regiment of Foot and was renamed the 24th Regiment of Foot in 1751. In 1782, the regiment was renamed the 24th (The 2nd Warwickshire) Regiment of Foot.

Based at Brecon from 1873, the regiment recruited from the border counties of Brecknockshire, Monmouthshire and Herefordshire. It was renamed to the South Wales Borderers in 1881 as a result the Childers Reforms. The regiment served in several major conflicts, including the American War of Independence, various conflicts in India, the Zulu War, Second Boer War, World War I and World War II. In 1969 the regiment was amalgamated with the Welch Regiment to form the Royal Regiment of Wales.

== History ==
=== Early history ===
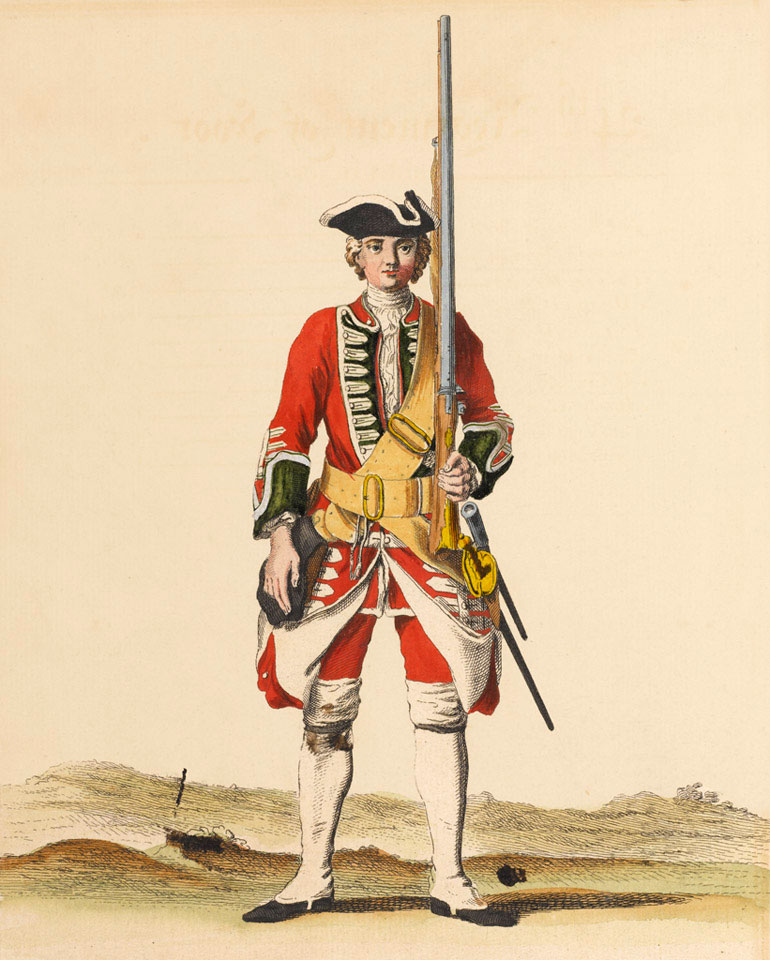
c. 1742 engraving of a regimental private

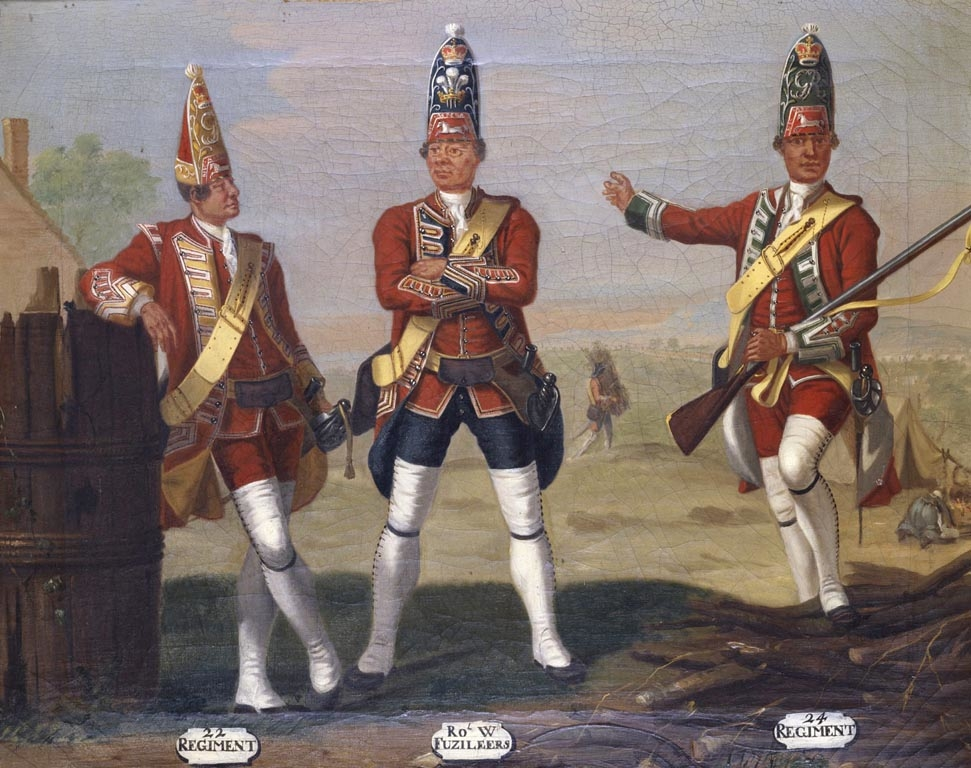
c. 1751 painting of a regimental grenadier (right)

The regiment was raised by Sir Edward Dering, 3rd Baronet as Sir Edward Dering's Regiment of Foot in 1689, becoming known, like other regiments, by the names of its subsequent colonels. The regiment served under the Duke of Schomberg during the Williamite War in Ireland and then saw action again at the Battle of Schellenberg in July 1704 and at the Battle of Blenheim in August 1704 during the War of the Spanish Succession.

The regiment was part of the British amphibious expedition to the Caribbean during the War of Jenkins' Ear which culminated in the disastrous Battle of Cartagena de Indias in March 1741 . In 1751, the regiment was renamed the 24th Regiment of Foot. It took part in the siege of Fort St Philip in Menorca in April 1756 during the Seven Years' War, where the regiment was captured by the victorious French before eventually being released. The regiment was also took part in the British naval descents on the French coast which culminated in the disastrous Battle of Saint-Cast in September 1758.

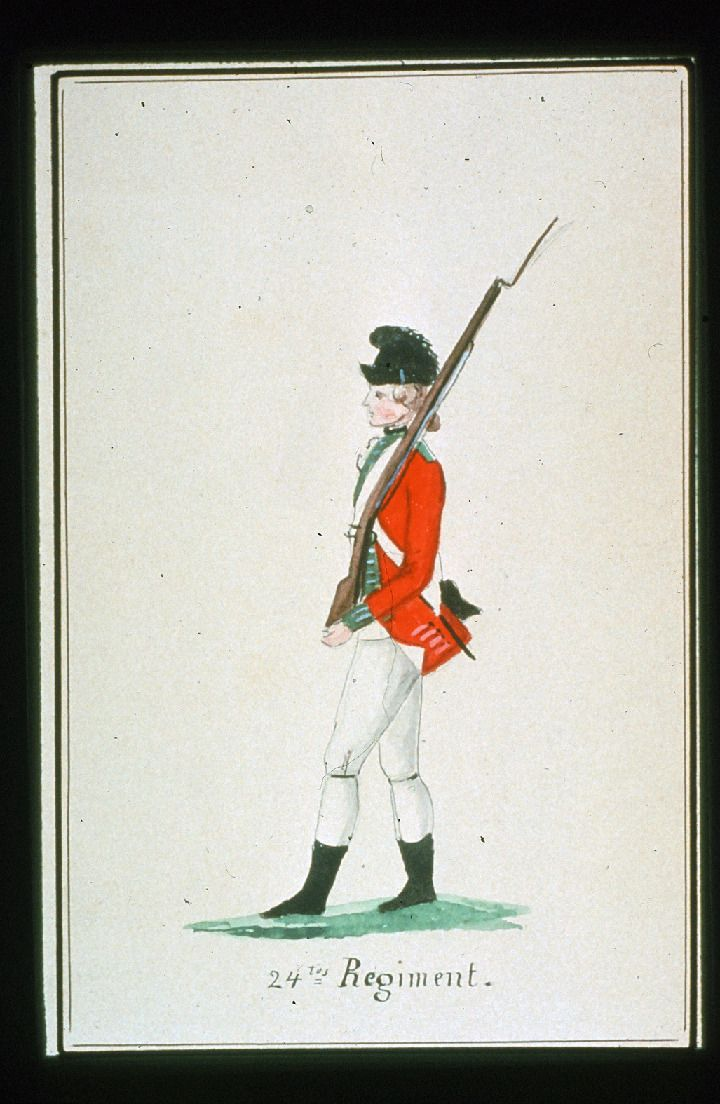
1777 watercolour of a regimental private

In June 1776 the regiment was sent to Quebec where it fought American rebels who had invaded the province as part of the American War of Independence. The regiment was part of the 5,000 British and Hessian troops under Lieutenant-general John Burgoyne which surrendered to the Americans in the Saratoga campaign in summer 1777 and remained imprisoned until 1783. In 1782 it was renamed the 24th (The 2nd Warwickshire) Regiment of Foot.

The regiment was deployed to Egypt in the aftermath of the Battle of Abukir in March 1801; a 2nd Battalion was raised in 1804 which suffered heavy losses at the Battle of Talavera in July 1809 during the Peninsular War. The regiment was involved in the 1806 invasion of the Cape Colony where it saw action at the Battle of Blaauwberg. The vast majority of the 1st Battalion was captured at sea by the French at the action of 3 July 1810 near the Comoro Islands; they had been on the East Indiamen Astell, Ceylon and Windham when a French frigate squadron captured the last two ships. They were released the following year. The 1st Battalion took part in the Anglo-Nepalese War in November 1814. The regiment was deployed to Canada in 1829 and remained there until 1842.

=== Second Sikh War and Indian Mutiny ===
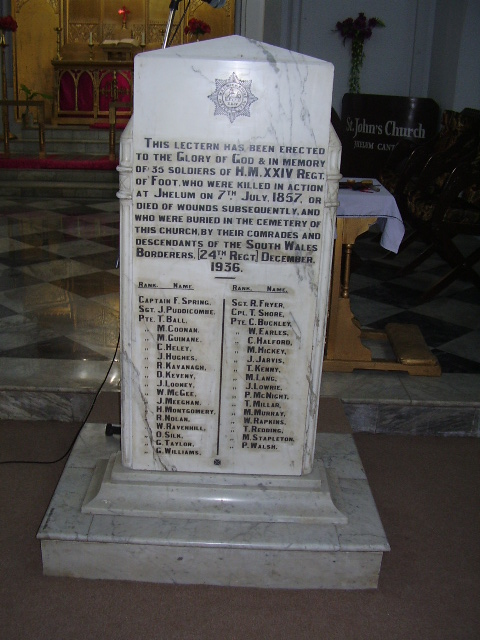
Marble memorial at St. John's, Jhelum, in memory of the soldiers of the 24th Foot killed there in July 1857 during the Indian Mutiny

The regiment returned to India in 1846 and saw action during the Second Anglo-Sikh War at the Battle of Chillianwala in January 1849, where the regiment fought off the enemy with bayonets rather than rifles and 255 of its men died. Meanwhile, five Victoria Crosses were awarded to men of the regiment who rescued their colleagues from cannibals on the Andaman Islands in May 1867. Some 35 soldiers of the regiment were killed by mutineers at their garrison in Jhelum in July 1857 during the Indian Rebellion: among the dead was Captain Francis Spring, the eldest son of Colonel William Spring.

=== Zulu War ===
==== Isandlwana ====
In 1879 both battalions took part in the Anglo-Zulu War, begun after a British invasion of Zululand, ruled by Cetshwayo. The 24th Regiment of Foot took part in the crossing of the Buffalo River on 11 January, entering Zululand. The first engagement (and the most disastrous for the British) came at Isandlwana. The British had pitched camp at Isandlwana and not established any fortifications due to the sheer size of the force, the hard ground and a shortage of entrenching tools. The 24th Foot provided most of the British force and when the overall commander, Lord Chelmsford, split his forces on 22 January to search for the Zulus, the 1st Battalion (5 companies) and a company of the 2nd Battalion were left behind to guard the camp, under the command of Lieutenant-Colonel Henry Pulleine (CO of the 1/24th Foot).

A Zulu force of some 20,000 warriors attacked a portion of the British main column consisting of about 1,800 British, colonial and native troops and perhaps 400 civilians. During the battle Lieutenant-Colonel Pulleine ordered Lieutenants Coghill and Melvill to save the Queen's Colour—the Regimental Colour was located at Helpmekaar with G Company. The two Lieutenants attempted to escape by crossing the Buffalo River where the Colour fell and was lost downstream, later being recovered. Both officers were killed. At this time the Victoria Cross (VC) was not awarded posthumously. This changed in the early 1900s when both Lieutenants were awarded posthumous Victoria Crosses for their bravery. The Battle of Isandlwana was dramatized in the 1979 movie Zulu Dawn.

==== Rorke's Drift ====
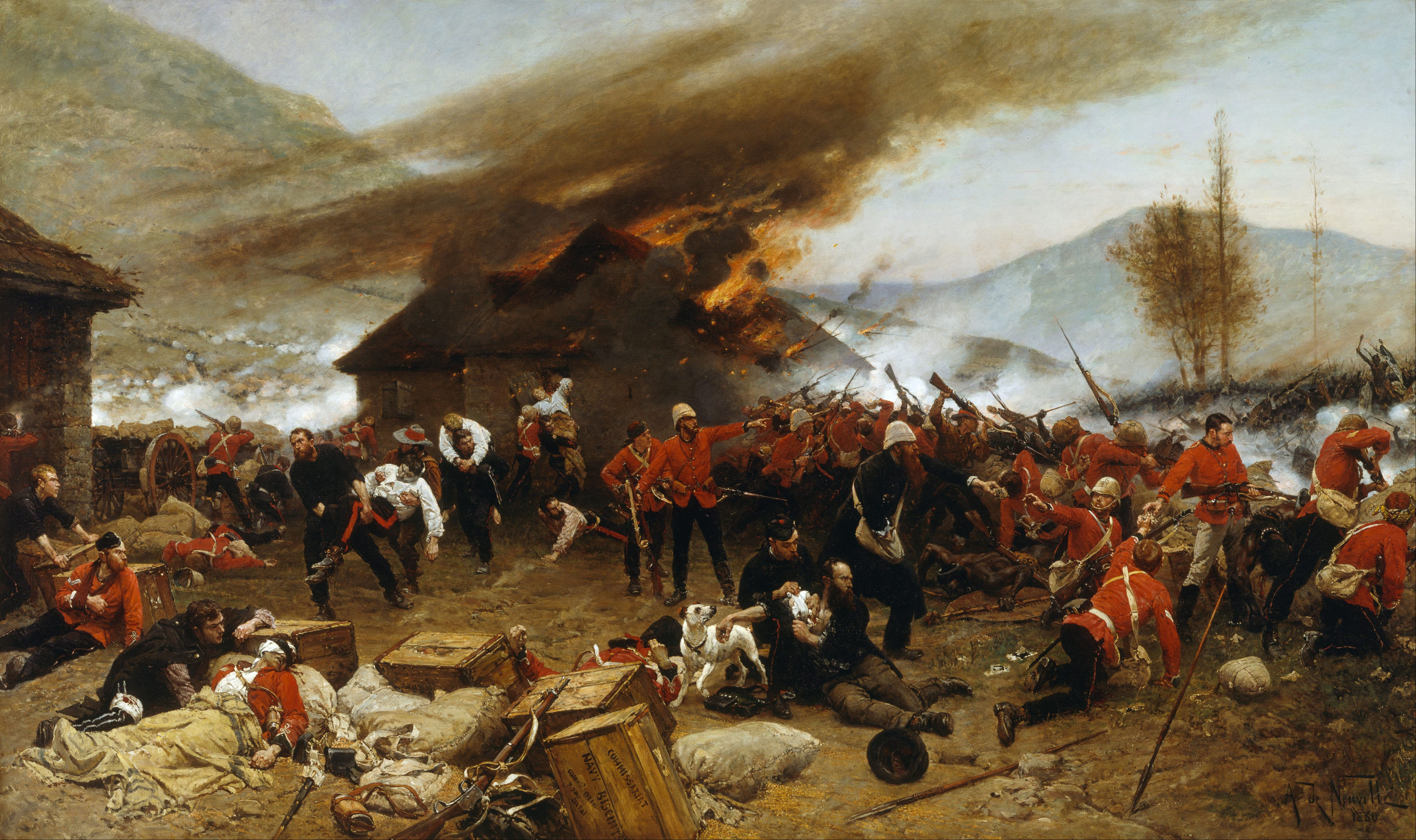
The regiment at the Battle of Rorke's Drift

After the battle of Isandlwana, some 4,000 to 5,000 Zulus headed for Rorke's Drift, a small missionary post garrisoned by a company of the 2nd Battalion of the 24th Foot, a few native levies, and others under the command of Lieutenant Chard, Royal Engineers. The most senior officer of the 24th present was Lieutenant Gonville Bromhead. Two Boer cavalry officers, Lieutenants Adendorff and Vane, arrived to inform the garrison of the defeat at Isandlwana. The Acting Assistant Commissary James Dalton persuaded Bromhead and Chard to stay and the small garrison frantically prepared rudimentary fortifications.

The Zulus first attacked at 4:30 pm. Throughout the day the garrison was attacked from all sides, including rifle fire from the heights above the garrison, and bitter hand-to-hand fighting often ensued. At one point the Zulus entered the hospital, which was stoutly defended by the wounded inside until it was set alight and eventually burnt down. The battle raged on into the early hours of 23 January but by dawn the Zulu Army had withdrawn. Lord Chelmsford and a column of British troops arrived soon afterwards. The garrison had suffered 15 killed during the battle (two died later) and 11 defenders were awarded the Victoria Cross for their distinguished defence of the post, seven going to soldiers of the 24th Foot. The stand at Rorke's Drift was immortalised in the 1964 movie Zulu.

=== Childers Reforms ===
The regiment was not fundamentally affected by the Cardwell Reforms of the 1870s, which gave it a depot at The Barracks, Brecon from 1873, or by the Childers reforms of 1881 – as it already possessed two battalions, there was no need for it to amalgamate with another regiment. However, it now had close links with South Wales, with a number of Militia and Volunteer battalions from the region linked to it. The 3rd (Militia) Battalion was formed of the former Royal South Wales Borderers Militia and the 4th from the Royal Montgomeryshire Rifles. It also had four (later five) Volunteer Battalions attached to it. Under the reforms the regiment became The South Wales Borderers on 1 July 1881.

The 1st Battalion was stationed in Egypt from 1892, then moved to British India. The battalion had various postings, including at Peshawar until late 1902 when it was posted to Mian Mir outside Lahore. The 1st Battalion remained in India until December 1910, when it was redeployed to garrison Chatham.

The 2nd Battalion was deployed to Burma and saw action in November 1885 during the Third Anglo-Burmese War.

==== Second Boer War ====
2nd Battalion arrived in Cape Colony in early February 1900 and saw action at the Battle of Elands River in September 1901 during the Second Boer War. During its service in South Africa the 2nd Bn was supplemented by a Volunteer Service Company provided by the regiment's volunteer battalions, which served as 'I' Company.

The 3rd (Militia) Battalion was embodied in January 1900, and the following month embarked for service in South Africa, arriving in Cape Town on the SS Cheshire in early March 1900. The 4th (Militia) Battalion was embodied for garrison duty at home.

=== Haldane Reforms ===
In 1908, the Volunteers and Militia were reorganised nationally (the Haldane Reforms), with the former becoming the Territorial Force (TF) and the latter the Special Reserve (SR). The regiment now had one SR battalion (the 3rd (Reserve) Bn at Brecon Barracks) and one TF battalion (the 1st Brecknockshire Bn at Conway Street drill hall, Brecon). The all-TF Monmouthshire Regiment comprising three battalions was also affiliated to it.

=== First World War ===
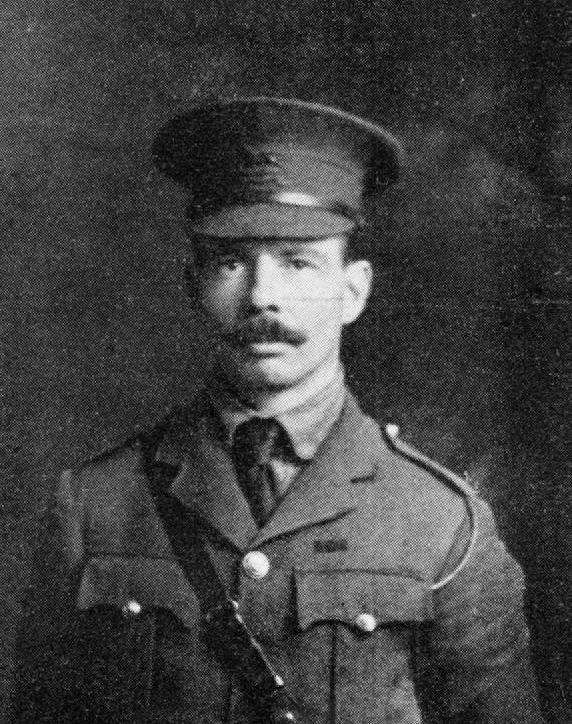
Lieutenant Colonel Sidney John Wilkinson of the 10th Battalion, killed in action during the First World War

==== Regular Army ====
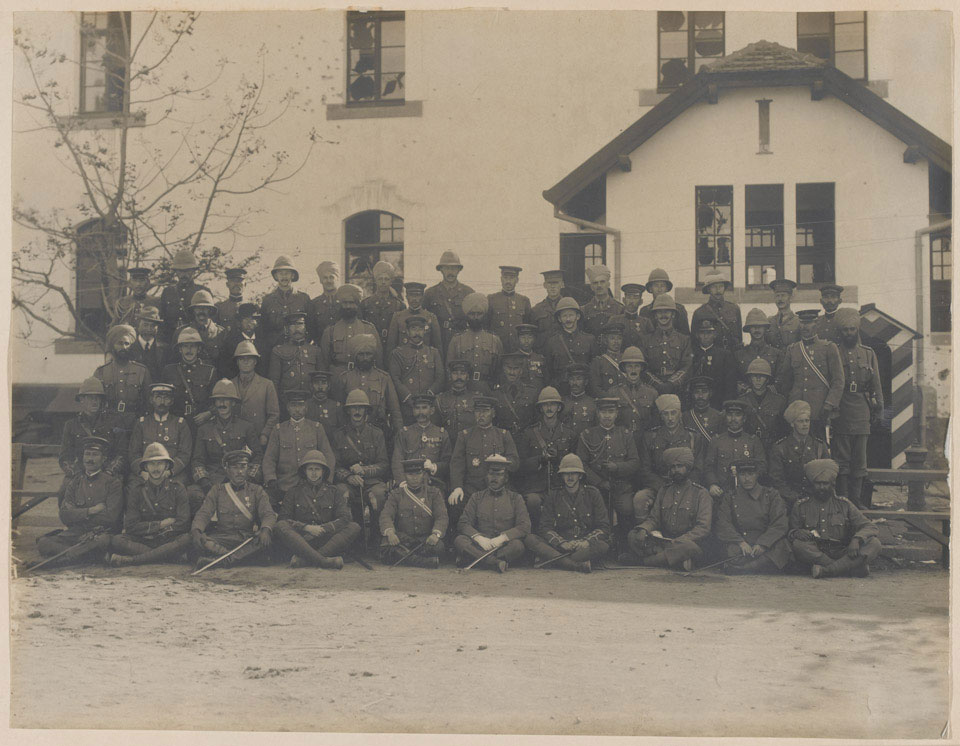
A detachment of the 36th Sikhs along with the 2nd Battalion, South Wales Borderers, sent to assist the Japanese in capturing Germany's naval base at Tsingtao (Qingdao) in China, 1914.

The 1st Battalion landed at Le Havre as part of the 3rd Brigade in the 1st Division with the British Expeditionary Force in August 1914 for service on the Western Front.

The 2nd Battalion landed at Laoshan Bay for operations against the German territory of Tsingtao in September 1914 and saw action at the Siege of Tsingtao in October 1914. After returning home in January 1915, the 2nd Battalion landed at Cape Helles as part of the 87th Brigade in the 29th Division in April 1915; it was evacuated from Gallipoli in January 1916 and then landed at Marseille in March 1916 for service on the Western Front.

==== Special Reserve ====
The 3rd (Reserve) Battalion served at Pembroke Dock and later at Hightown, near Liverpool in home defence while supplying thousands of reinforcements for the regular battalions overseas.

==== Territorial Force ====
The 1/1st Brecknockshire Battalion sailed to India attached to the 44th (Home Counties) Division in October 1914. After arriving at Bombay in December it immediately moved to Aden. After seeing action at the Battle of Lahej in July 1915 it returned to Bombay. It remained in garrison at Mhow until October 1919, supplying reinforcement drafts to the 4th (Service) Battalion, SWB, in Mesopotamia and to the units involved in the Third Anglo-Afghan War.

The 2/1st and 3/1st Brecknockshire battalions were formed in September 1914 and April 1915 respectively to provide TF reinforcements. Both were absorbed into other Welsh reserve units as the war progressed.

==== New Armies ====
The 4th (Service) Battalion was formed at Brecon in August 1914 as part of Kitchener's 1st Army ('K1'). It landed in Gallipoli as part of the 40th Infantry Brigade of the 13th (Western) Division on 15 July 1915; it was evacuated from Gallipoli in January 1916 and moved to Egypt and then to Mesopotamia.

The 5th (Service) Battalion (Pioneers), formed as a K2 unit in September 1914, landed at Le Havre as part of the 58th Infantry Brigade of the 19th (Western) Division in July 1915 for service on the Western Front.

The 6th (Service) Battalion (Pioneers), a K3 unit formed in September 1914, landed at Le Havre as part of the 76th Infantry Brigade of the 25th Division in September 1915 for service on the Western Front.

The 7th (Service) Battalion and the 8th (Service) Battalion, both formed as K3 units in September 1914, landed at Boulogne-sur-Mer as part of the 67th Infantry Brigade of the 22nd Division in September 1915 for service on the Western Front but moved to Salonika in October 1915.

The 9th (Service) Battalion was formed in K4 at Pembroke Dock alongside 3rd (Reserve) Battalion at the end of October 1914, but was then converted into the 9th (Reserve) Battalion to supply reinforcements to the 4th–8th battalions.

The 10th (Service) Battalion (1st Gwent), 11th (Service) Battalion (2nd Gwent) and 12th (Service) Battalion (3rd Gwent) were raised by the Welsh National Executive Committee as K5 or 'Pals battalions'. The 10th and 11th landed at Le Havre as part of the 115th Infantry Brigade in the 38th (Welsh) Division in December 1915 for service on the Western Front. The 12th (Service) Battalion (3rd Gwent) was raised as a Bantam battalion and landed at Le Havre as part of the 119th Infantry Brigade of the 40th Division in June 1916 for service on the Western Front. Welsh poet and language activist Saunders Lewis served in the 12th Battalion during the First World War.

Also formed were the 13th and 14th (Reserve) battalions in 1915, the short-lived 15th (Service) Battalion in June 1918, and the 52nd and 53rd (Graduated) and 54th (Young Soldier) battalions, which were all training units.

=== Inter-War ===
The 1st Battalion embarked for Ireland in June 1920 to maintain order during the Irish War of Independence. The 1st Battalion was in County Meath from September 1920 to February 1922, deployed at Dunshaughlin. Company-sized detachments would also serve in the nearby settlements of Navan, Nobber, Kells and Oldcastle, County Meath. Having arrived on the Indian subcontinent in 1934, it was sent to Waziristan in February 1937 in connection with disturbances on the frontier.

Meanwhile, the 2nd Battalion was sent overseas to Barrackpore in India in 1919, being present in Jhansi in 1921, redeploying to Delhi in 1925, Aden in 1927 then returning to garrison Portsmouth in February 1929. The 2nd Battalion's next tour of duty overseas was Malta in September 1935, followed by Palestine in 1936, returning home at the end of the year.

=== Second World War ===
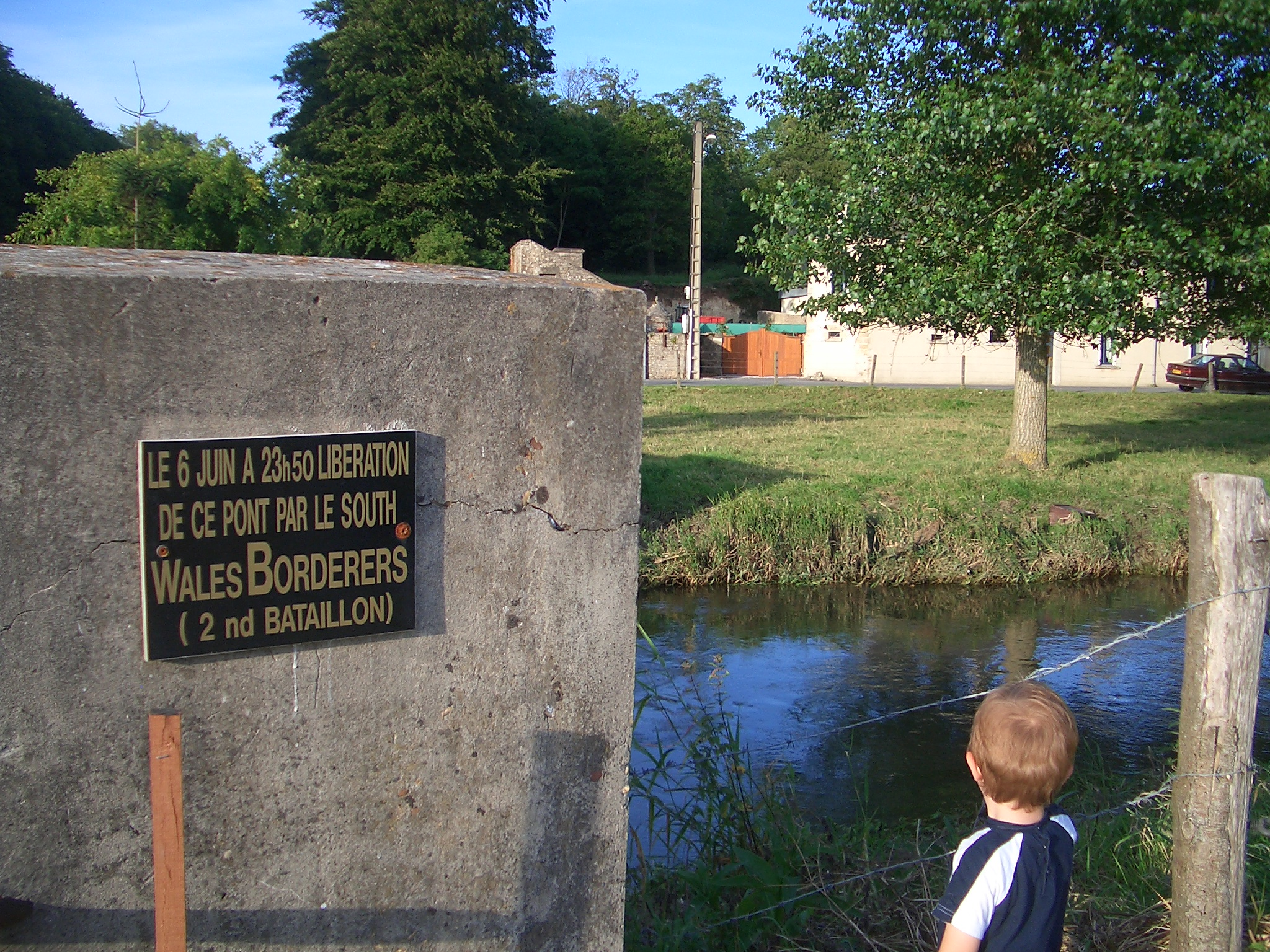
Plaque commemorating the liberation of a bridge in Normandy by the 2nd Battalion, South Wales Borderers on D-Day in June 1944.

1st Battalion

The 1st Battalion, as part of the 10th Indian Infantry Division, was sent to Iraq to quell a German-inspired uprising in Iraq in November 1941. The battalion saw subsequent service in Iran. The battalion sustained enormous casualties in Libya near Tobruk when they lost around 500 officers and men captured or killed during a general retreat. The battalion found itself cut off when the German forces outflanked them, the Commanding Officer, Lieutenant Colonel Francis Matthews, decided to attempt to escape around the enemy and break through to British lines. It turned into a disaster with only four officers and around one hundred men reaching Sollum. To the surprise of the survivors the battalion was ordered to disband in Cyprus and the remnants of the battalion were transferred, with the exception of a small cadre that returned to the United Kingdom, to the 1st Battalion of the King's Own Royal Regiment (Lancaster). A few months later the battalion was re-formed from the cadre and the 4th Battalion, Monmouthshire Regiment.

2nd Battalion

Upon the outbreak of the Second World War in September 1939, the 2nd Battalion was serving in Derry, Northern Ireland, under command of Northern Ireland District, having been there since December 1936. In December 1939 the battalion left Northern Ireland and was sent to join the 148th Infantry Brigade of the 49th (West Riding) Infantry Division, a Territorial formation. In April 1940 the battalion was again transferred to the newly created 24th Guards Brigade (Rupertforce), and took part in the Norwegian Campaign, and were among the first British troops to see action against the German Army in the Second World War. The campaign failed and the brigade had to be evacuated. Casualties in the battalion, however, had been remarkably light, with only 13 wounded and 6 killed and two DCMs had been awarded.

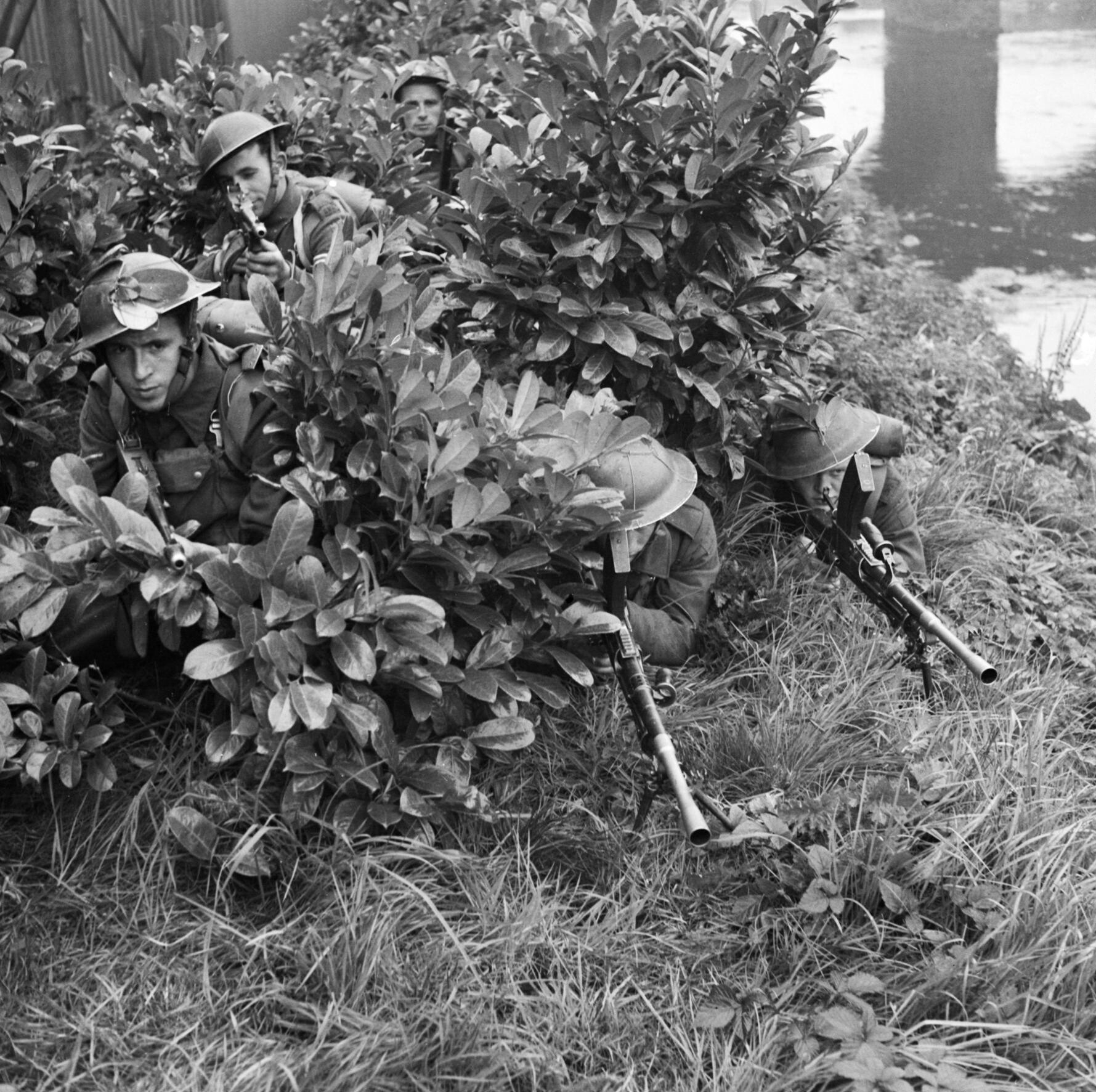
2nd Battalion soldiers during a brigade exercise near Ballymena, 19 September 1941

The 2nd Battalion returned to the United Kingdom and, on 7 December 1941 (the day the United States entered the war), transferred to the 37th Independent Infantry Brigade (redesignated 7th Infantry Brigade the day after). On 1 March 1944 the battalion was transferred to the newly created 56th Independent Infantry Brigade, alongside which were the 2nd Battalion, Essex Regiment and 2nd Battalion, Gloucestershire Regiment and trained for the invasion of Normandy. The battalion had the distinction of being the only Welsh battalion to take part in the Normandy landings on 6 June 1944, landing at Gold Beach under command of 50th (Northumbrian) Infantry Division and fought in the Battle of Normandy, under command of 7th Armoured Division for a few days in June 1944, before reverting to the 50th Division. In August 1944 it was briefly under command of the 59th (Staffordshire) Infantry Division and fought in the Battle of the Falaise Gap. On 20 August the brigade joined the 49th (West Riding) Infantry Division, replacing the disbanded 70th Brigade. With the division, the battalion fought in the operations to clear the Channel coast, where they captured Le Havre in Operation Astonia. Afterwards the battalion enjoyed a short rest and, on 22 September, moved to join the rest of the 21st Army Group fighting in Belgium. In October, shortly after the failure of Operation Market Garden, the division was sent to garrison the "Island", as the area of land between Arnhem and Nijmegen was known, where it remained throughout the northern winter of 1944/45. The last major action for the battalion was in April 1945 when, with the rest of the division, they fought in the Second Battle of Arnhem. The battalion ended its war in Germany, and remained there, as part of the occupation forces, until 1948 when it returned home. During the campaign in North-western Europe the battalion had suffered over 100% casualties.

6th Battalion

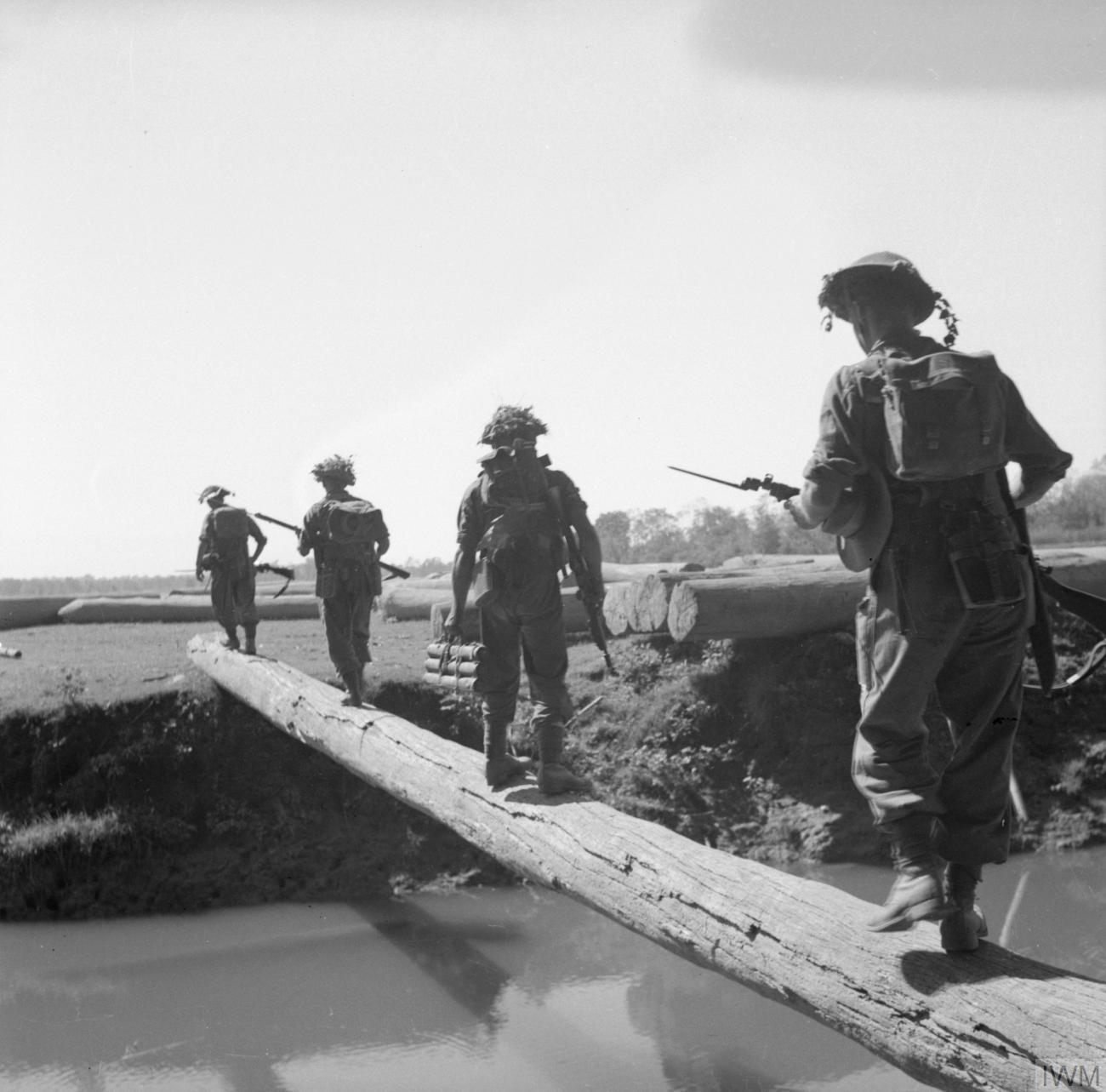
6th Battalion troops crossing a stream near Bahe, January 1945

The 6th Battalion, South Wales Borderers served in the Burma campaign with the 72nd Infantry Brigade, 36th British Infantry Division, previously a division of the British Indian Army before being redesignated the 36th British Division.

7th Battalion

This was formed in May 1940 as 50th Holding Battalion, South Wales Borderers, becoming a normal infantry unit on 9 October as 7th Battalion. It served in Home Defence with 224th Independent Infantry Brigade (Home). It then transferred to the Royal Artillery on 15 November 1941 as 90th Light Anti-Aircraft Regiment, seeing service in Tunisia and Italy with 1st Infantry Division.

=== Post-War ===
The 1st Battalion was deployed to Palestine to deal with the volatile uprising in Palestine there in October 1945 and then moved to Cyprus in April 1946. The 2nd Battalion was disbanded in May 1948 as a consequence of defence cuts implemented shortly after the Second World War.

The regiment deployed to the Sudan in March 1949 and became part of the occupation force in Eritrea, a former Italian colony that was ruled by a British military administration, in January 1950. The regiment arrived in Brunswick, West Germany as part of the British Army of the Rhine in January 1953 and was then deployed to Malaya in December 1955, as part of the response to the Malayan Emergency. The regiment's conduct during the war compelled Field Marshal Sir Gerald Templer to state that, "there has been no better regiment in Malaya during the ten years of the emergency and very few as good".

The regiment was posted to Minden, Germany in June 1959 and returned home three years later. It arrived at Stanley Fort in Hong Kong in November 1963 to perform internal security duties. It returned home to Lydd in Kent in June 1966 before deploying to Aden in January 1967.

The regiment was amalgamated with the Welch Regiment to form the Royal Regiment of Wales (24th/41st Foot) in June 1969.

== Regimental museum ==
The Regimental Museum of The Royal Welsh (Brecon) is at The Barracks, Brecon, South Wales.

== Battle honours ==
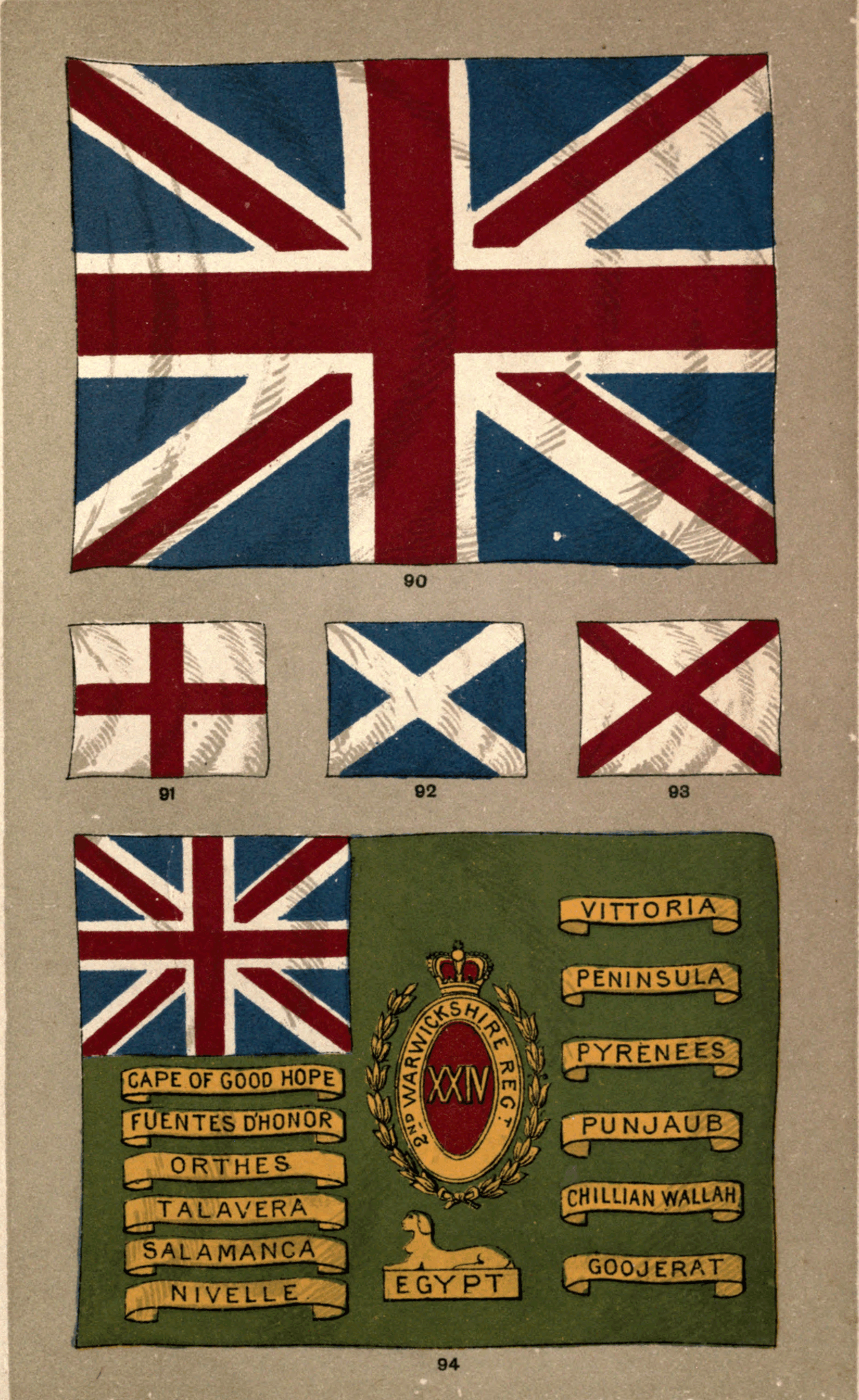
No. 94: Regimental flag of the 24th Regiment of Foot.

The regiment's battle honours were as follows:

- Early wars: Blenheim, Ramillies, Oudenarde, Malplaquet, [Egypt]1, Cape of Good Hope 1806, Talavera, Busaco, Fuentes d'Onor, Salamanca, Vittoria, Pyrenees, Nivelle, Orthes, Peninsula, Chillianwallah, Goojerat, Punjaub, South Africa 1877–8–9, Burma 1885–87, South Africa 1900–02
- The Great War: Mons, Retreat from Mons, Marne 1914, Aisne 1914 '18, Ypres 1914 '17 '18, Langemarck 1914 '17, Gheluvelt, Nonne Bosschen, Givenchy 1914, Aubers, Loos, Somme 1916 '18, Albert 1916 '18, Bazentin, Pozières, Flers-Courcelette, Morval, Ancre Heights, Ancre 1916, Arras 1917 '18, Scarpe 1917, Messines 1917 '18, Pilckem, Menin Road, Polygon Wood, Broodseinde, Poelcappelle, Passchendaele, Cambrai 1917 '18, St. Quentin, Bapaume 1918, Lys, Estaires, Hazebrouck, Bailleul, Kemmel, Béthune, Scherpenberg, Drocourt-Quéant, Hindenburg Line, Havrincourt, Épéhy, St. Quentin Canal, Beaurevoir, Courtrai, Selle, Valenciennes, Sambre, France and Flanders 1914–18, Doiran 1917 '18, Macedonia 1915–18, Helles, Landing at Helles, Krithia, Suvla, Sari Bair, Scimitar Hill, Gallipoli 1915–16, Egypt 1916, Tigris 1916, Kut al Amara 1917, Baghdad, Mesopotamia 1916–18, Tsingtao
- The Second World War: Norway 1940, Normandy Landing, Sully, Caen, Falaise, Risle Crossing, Le Havre, Antwerp-Turnhout Canal, Scheldt, Zetten, Arnhem 1945, North-West Europe 1944–45, Gazala, North Africa 1942, North Arakan, Mayu Tunnels, Pinwe, Shweli, Myitson, Burma 1944–45

== Uniforms ==
As the 24th Foot the regiment wore first "willow green" and later "grass green" facings on the standard red coats of the British line infantry. In 1881 the facings on the scarlet tunics adopted in 1873, were changed to white but in 1905 the regiment reverted to the historic green. Officers wore silver braid and other distinctions until gold was introduced in 1830. The khaki service dress adopted in 1902, and battle dress in 1938, was of the universal pattern.

== Victoria Cross recipients ==
- Corporal William Wilson Allen (2nd Battalion, 24th Regiment of Foot)
- Private David Bell (2nd Battalion, 24th Regiment of Foot)
- Lieutenant Edward Stevenson Browne (1st Battalion, 24th Regiment of Foot)
- Temporary Lieutenant-Colonel Daniel Burges (7th (Service) Battalion, South Wales Borderers)
- Lieutenant Nevill Josiah Aylmer Coghill (1st Battalion, 24th Regiment of Foot)
- Lieutenant Gonville Bromhead (2nd Battalion, 24th Regiment of Foot)
- Temporary Captain Angus Buchanan (4th (Service) Battalion, South Wales Borderers)
- Private James Cooper (2nd Battalion, 24th Regiment of Foot)
- Assistant Surgeon Campbell Mellis Douglas (2nd Battalion, 24th Regiment of Foot)
- Lieutenant Edric Frederick, The Lord Gifford (2nd Battalion, 24th Regiment of Foot)
- Private James Henry Fynn (4th (Service) Battalion, South Wales Borderers)
- Private William Griffiths (2nd Battalion, 24th Regiment of Foot)
- Private Frederick Hitch (2nd Battalion, 24th Regiment of Foot)
- Private Alfred Henry Hook (2nd Battalion, 24th Regiment of Foot)
- Acting Lieutenant-Colonel Dudley Graham Johnson (2nd Battalion, South Wales Borderers)
- Private Robert Jones (2nd Battalion, 24th Regiment of Foot)
- Private William Jones (2nd Battalion, 24th Regiment of Foot)
- Lieutenant Teignmouth Melvill (1st Battalion, 24th Regiment of Foot)
- Private Thomas Murphy (2nd Battalion, 24th Regiment of Foot)
- Sergeant Ivor Rees (11th (Service) Battalion (1st Gwent), South Wales Borderers)
- Sergeant Albert White (2nd Battalion, South Wales Borderers)
- Company Sergeant-Major John (Jack) Henry Williams (10th (Service) Battalion (1st Gwent), South Wales Borderers)
- Private John Williams (2nd Battalion, 24th Regiment of Foot)

== Colonels of the Regiment ==
The colonels of the regiment were as follows:

- 1689: Col Sir Edward Dering, 3rd Baronet
- 1689–1691: Col Daniel Dering
- 1691–1695: Col Samuel Venner
- 1695–1701: Col Louis James le Vasseur, Marquis de Puisar
- 1701–1702: Lt-Gen William Seymour
- 1702–1704: Gen John Churchill, 1st Duke of Marlborough KG
- 1704–1708: Lt-Gen William Tatton
- 1708–1717: Major-Gen Gilbert Primrose
- 1717–1737: Lt-Gen Thomas Howard
- 1737–1745: Lt-Gen Thomas Wentworth
- 1745–1747: Brig-Gen Daniel Houghton
- 1747–1752: Gen The Earl of Ancram

=== The 24th Regiment of Foot ===
- 1752–1776: Lt-Gen Hon. Edward Cornwallis

=== 24th (2nd Warwickshire) Regiment of Foot ===
- 1776–1793: Lt-Gen William Taylor
- 1793–1807: Gen Richard Whyte
- 1807–1829: Gen Sir David Baird, 1st Baronet GCB KC
- 1829–1842: Lt-Gen Sir James Frederick Lyon KCB GCH
- 1842–1856: Gen Robert Ellice
- 1856–1861: Lt-Gen Hon. John Finch CB
- 1861–1884: Gen Pringle Taylor KH

=== The South Wales Borderers ===
- 1884–1888: Gen. Sir Charles Henry Ellice, GCB
- 1888–1898: Gen. Edmund Wodehouse
- 1898–1900: Lt-Gen. Richard Thomas Glyn, CB, CMG
- 1900–1902: Maj-Gen. Henry James Degacher, CB
- 1902–1922: Maj-Gen. George Paton, CMG
- 1922–1931: Gen. Sir Alexander Stanhope Cobbe, VC, GCB, KCSI, DSO
- 1931–1944: Maj-Gen. Llewellyn Isaac Gethin Morgan-Owen, CB, CMG, CBE, DSO
- 1944–1950: Maj-Gen. Dudley Graham Johnson, VC, CB, DSO, MC
- 1950–1954: Gen. Sir Alfred Reade Godwin-Austen, KCSI, CB, OBE, MC
- 1954–1961: Maj-Gen. Francis Raymond Gage Matthews, CB, DSO
- 1961–1969: Maj-Gen. Sir David Peel Yates, DSO, OBE

== Alliances ==
- (Australia) 18th Battalion (The Kurung-Gai Regiment) (1929–1944)
- (Australia) 17th/18th Infantry Battalion (The North Shore Regiment) (1948–1960)
- (Australia) 24th Battalion (The Kooyong Regiment) (1929–1951)
- (Southern Rhodesia) / (Rhodesia) 1st Battalion, The Rhodesian African Rifles (1957–1965)

== Famous members ==
- Charles Ancliffe, composer
- Gonville Bromhead, fought at Rorke's Drift

== See also ==
- List of battalions of the South Wales Borderers
- Battle of Rorke's Drift

== Sources ==
- Atkinson, Capt. C.T. (2014) [1931]. The History of the South Wales Borderers 1914 - 1918. Naval & Military Press. ISBN 978-1-78331-077-7.
- Brenton, Edward Pelham (1825). The Naval History of Great Britain. London: C. Rice.
- Carman, W.Y. (1985). Richard Simkin's Uniforms of the British Army. The Infantry Regiments. Webb & Bower. p. 53. ISBN 0-86350-031-5.
- Colenso, Frances E. (1880). History of the Zulu War and Its Origin. London: Chapman and Hall.
- Courtney, Ultan (2018). The Tin Hats, The South Wales Borderers in County Meath 1920-22. Cashel, County Tipperary: Lion Press. ISBN 978-0-9930549-1-4.
- J.B.M. Frederick, Lineage Book of British Land Forces 1660–1978, Vol I, Wakefield: Microform Academic, 1984, ISBN 1-85117-007-3.
- J.B.M. Frederick, Lineage Book of British Land Forces 1660–1978, Vol II, Wakefield: Microform Academic, 1984, ISBN 1-85117-009-X.
- Hart's Army List for 1901. London: John Murray. 1901 – via nls.uk. "Corrected to the 31st December 1900"
- Hart's Army List for 1903. London: John Murray. 1903 – via nls.uk. "Corrected to the 31st December 1902"
- The Quarterly Indian Army List July 1921. Calcutta: Army Department, Government of India. 1921. ark:/13960/t2h75x79z – via archive.org.
- James, E.A. (2001) [1978]. British Regiments 1914–18. Uckfield: Naval & Military Press. ISBN 978-1-84342-197-9.
- Joslen, Lt-Col H.F. (2003) [1960]. Orders of Battle, United Kingdom and Colonial Formations and Units in the Second World War, 1939–1945. Uckfield: Naval & Military Press. ISBN 978-1-84-342474-1.
- Knight, Ian (1996). Rorke's Drift 1879, "Pinned Like Rats in a Hole". Osprey. ISBN 1-85532-506-3.
- Knight, Ian (2002). Isandlwana 1879: The Great Zulu Victory. Osprey. ISBN 1-84176-511-2.
- Owen, Bryn (2000). History of the Welsh Militia and Volunteer Corps 1757–1908: Montgomeryshire Regiments of Militia, Volunteers and Yeomanry Cavalry. Wrexham: Bridge Books. ISBN 1-872424-85-6.
- Whybra, Julian (2020). England's Sons: The roll call for Isandhlwana and Rorke's Drift (9th ed.). Chelmsford: One Slice Books Ltd. ISBN 978-1-90-890194-1.
