= 1902 Coronation Honours =

British government recognitions

The 1902 Coronation Honours were announced on 26 June 1902, the date originally set for the coronation of King Edward VII. The coronation was postponed because the King had been taken ill two days before, but he ordered that the honours list should be published on that day anyway.

The list included appointments to various orders and honours of the United Kingdom and British India, and the creation of two new decorations:

- the Order of Merit
- the Imperial Service Order

The first Companions of the Imperial Service Orders were not announced until the following November Birthday Honours list, however.

There were also some promotions and appointments in the British Army announced in the list.

The honours were covered in the press at the time, including in The Times on the day, but formal announcements in The London Gazette were spread out over the following months, in gazettes dated 26 June 1902, 11 July 1902, 18 July 1902, 22 July 1902, 25 July 1902, and 2 September 1902.

A South African list, honouring people for their service during the Second Boer War, was published on the same day.

== Order of the Garter ==
Order of the Garter ribbon

- Arthur Wellesley, 4th Duke of Wellington, GCVO
- Cromartie Sutherland-Leveson-Gower, 4th Duke of Sutherland

== Order of the Thistle ==
Order of the Thistle ribbon

- Henry Innes-Ker, 8th Duke of Roxburghe, MVO
- George Baillie-Hamilton-Arden, 11th Earl of Haddington

== Order of St Patrick ==
Order of St Patrick ribbon

- Lowry Cole, 4th Earl of Enniskillen
- Dudley FitzGerald-de Ros, 24th Baron de Ros

== Peerages ==
=== Marquess ===
- John Hope, 7th Earl of Hopetoun, KT, GCMG, GCVO, Governor-General of the Commonwealth of Australia, created Marquess of Linlithgow

=== Viscount ===
- Charles Colville, 1st Baron Colville of Kinross, KT, GCVO, created Viscount Colville of Culross
- Victor Spencer, 3rd Baron Spencer, KCVO, created Viscount Churchill
- Alfred Milner, 1st Baron Milner, GCB, GCMG, created Viscount Milner

=== Baron ===
- John Balfour, Lord Justice-General of Scotland, created Baron Kinross
- Sir Ughtred Kay-Shuttleworth, MP, created Baron Shuttleworth
- William L. Jackson, MP, created Baron Allerton
- Arthur Smith-Barry, created Baron Barrymore
- General Sir Francis Grenfell, GCB, GCMG, created Baron Grenfell
- Sir Francis Knollys, GCVO, KCB, KCMG, created Baron Knollys
- Algernon Bertram Freeman-Mitford, CB, CVO, created Baron Redesdale

== Privy Council ==
- Ronald Leslie-Melville, 11th Earl of Leven
- Gilbert Elliot-Murray-Kynynmound, 4th Earl of Minto, GCMG, Governor-General of the Dominion of Canada
- Nathan Rothschild, 1st Baron Rothschild
- William Thomson, 1st Baron Kelvin, GCVO, FRS
- Joseph Lister, 1st Baron Lister, FRS
- Sir Edward Grey, 3rd Baronet, MP
- Sir John Dorington, 1st Baronet, MP
- Sir Hugh MacDonell, GCMG, CB
- Sir Antony MacDonnell, GCSI
- Sir Alfred Lyall, GCIE, KCB
- Lieutenant-Colonel Sir Albert Hime, KCMG (Premier of Natal)
- Sir Robert Bond, KCMG (Premier of Newfoundland)
- Sir Ernest Cassel, KCMG, KCVO
- Richard B. Haldane, KC, MP
- Arthur Jeffreys, MP
- James Round, MP

== Privy Council of Ireland ==
- James Butler, 3rd Marquess of Ormonde, KP
- John Crichton, 4th Earl Erne, KP
- Anthony Nugent, 11th Earl of Westmeath
- (John) Ross
- (William) Kenny
- Jonathan Hogg
- Daniel Dixon, Lord Mayor of Belfast

== Baronets ==
- Andrew Marshall Porter, Master of the Rolls in Ireland
- Sir Joseph Dimsdale, Lord Mayor of the City of London
- Colonel Sir Edward Bradford, GCB, KCSI
- Sir Andrew Noble, KCB
- Sir Francis Evans, KCMG, MP
- Sir Francis Laking, KCVO, MD
- Sir Thomas Lipton, KCVO
- Sir Frederick Treves, KCVO, CB, FRCS, Honorary Serjeant-Surgeon to His Majesty
- Sir Hubert Parry, Mus. Doc.
- Sir George Lewis
- Sir Edward Poynter, President of the Royal Academy
- Sir Thomas Jackson
- Alexander Henderson, MP
- Robert Hermon-Hodge, MP
- Philip A. Muntz, MP
- Charles Bright McLaren, MP
- William E. Tomlinson, MP

== Knights Bachelor ==
- John Charles Bell, Sheriff of the City of London
- Horace Brooks Marshall, Sheriff of the City of London
- William Allan, MP
- Francis Cowley Burnand
- Caspar Purdon Clarke, CIE
- William Laird Clowes
- William Job Collins, MD, FRCS
- Alfred Cooper, FRCS
- John Halliday Croom, President of the Royal College of Surgeons (Edinburgh)
- Thomas Dewar, MP
- Arthur Conan Doyle, MD
- William Emerson, President of the Royal Society of British Architects
- Colonel Aubone George Fife, Standard Bearer of His Majesty's Bodyguard of Gentlemen at Arms
- Thomas Firbank, MP
- Thomas Fraser, FRS, MD, President of the Royal College of Physicians of Edinburgh
- William Henry Holland, MP
- Samuel Hall, KC, Vice-Chancellor of the Duchy of Lancaster
- Colonel Reginald Hennell, DSO, Adjutant of His Majesty's Bodyguard of Yeomen of the Guard
- Victor Horsley, FRS, FRCS
- Henry G. Howse, President of the Royal College of Surgeons
- Joseph Lawrence, MP
- Ralph Littler, CB, KC
- George Livesey
- Oliver Lodge, FRS
- Henry Bell Longhurst, Hon. Surgeon-Dentist to His Majesty
- John Henry Luscombe, Chairman of Lloyd's
- John McDougall, chairman, London County Council
- Professor William Macewen, FRS, FRCS
- William Mather, MP
- Isambard Owen, MD, Senior Deputy Chancellor of the University of Wales
- Gilbert Parker, MP
- Paynton Pigott, Chief Constable of Norfolk
- Arthur Rücker, FRS, Principal of the University of London
- William J. Soulsby, CB, CIE
- Charles Villiers Stanford, Mus. Doc.
- Alfred Thomas, MP
- John Thornycroft, FRS
- Ernest Waterlow, A.R.A., President of the Royal Society of Painters in Water Colours
- Joseph Loftus Wilkinson, General Manager, Great Western Railway
- Guy Fleetwood Wilson, CB, Assistant Under-Secretary of State, War Office
- Charles Wyndham

British Empire

- C. Paul Chater, CMG, Member of the Executive and Legislative Council, Hong Kong
- James Liege Hulett, Speaker of the Legislative Assembly, Natal
- Willem van Hulsteyn, of Johannesburg
- Henri Taschereau, Judge of the Supreme Court, Canada
- Robert Boak, President of the Legislative Council of Nova Scotia
- Edward Dalton Shea, President of the Legislative Council of Newfoundland
- Edward Albert Stone, Chief Justice of Western Australia
- J. Lancelot Stirling, President of the Legislative Council of South Australia
- Henry McLaurin, Chancellor of the University of Sydney
- Arthur Rutledge, Attorney-General of Queensland
- A. Thorpe-Douglas, President of the Legislative Council of Tasmania
- William Russell Russell, Member of the New Zealand House of Representatives
- John Logan Campbell, late Mayor of Auckland, New Zealand

Ireland

- John George Barton, CB, Commissioner of Valuation
- James Brown Dougherty, CB, Assistant Under-Secretary for Ireland
- John Hamilton Franks, CB, Secretary of the Irish Land Commission
- Francis Henry Miller, Mayor of Londonderry
- Thomas Myles, MB, President of the Royal College of Surgeons in Ireland
- Vincent Nash, High Sheriff of Limerick City
- George Roche, past President of the Incorporated Law Society of Ireland
- John Olphert
- William Whitla, MD
- James Murphy, President of Chamber of Commerce, Dublin

== Order of Merit ==
Order of Merit ribbon

- Field Marshal Frederick Roberts, 1st Earl Roberts, KG, KP, VC
- Field Marshal Garnet Wolseley, 1st Viscount Wolseley, KP, GCB
- General Herbert Kitchener, Viscount Kitchener of Khartoum, GCB, GCMG
- John William Strutt, 3rd Baron Rayleigh, FRS
- William Thomson, 1st Baron Kelvin, GCVO, FRS
- Joseph Lister, 1st Baron Lister, FRS
- Admiral of the Fleet Sir Henry Keppel, GCB
- John Morley, MP
- William Edward Hartpole Lecky, MP
- Admiral Sir Edward Hobart Seymour, GCB
- Sir William Huggins, KCB, PRS
- George Frederic Watts, RA

== The Most Honourable Order of the Bath ==
Order of the Bath ribbon

=== Knight Grand Cross of the Order of the Bath (GCB) ===
Military Division

- Admiral Lord Walter Talbot Kerr, KCB
- Admiral Sir John Arbuthnot Fisher, KCB
- Vice-Admiral Sir Frederick George Denham Bedford, KCB
- Admiral Sir John Charles Dalrymple Hay, 3rd Baronet, KCB (Retired)
- Admiral Sir William Graham, KCB (Retired)
- Admiral Sir Algernon Charles Fieschi Heneage, KCB (Retired)
- Admiral Sir Alexander Buller, KCB (Retired)
- General Sir Richard Chambre Hayes Taylor, KCB
- General Sir Harry North Dalrymple Prendergast, VC, KCB, Unemployed Supernumerary list, Royal (late Madras) Engineers
- General Sir John Watson, VC, KCB, Unemployed Supernumerary list, Indian Staff Corps
- Lieutenant-General Sir Robert Hume, KCB
- General Sir Martin Dillon, KCB, CSI
- General Sir Reginald Gibbs, KCB
- Lieutenant-General Sir Robert Grant, KCB

Civil Division

- Edward Hyde Villiers, 5th Earl of Clarendon, PC, Lord Chamberlain
- Sir Francis Henry Jeune, KCB, PC, Judge Advocate General
- Sir Algernon Edward West, KCB, PC
- General Sir Dighton Macnaghten Probyn, VC, GCVO, KCB, KCSI, PC,

=== Knights Commander of the Order of the Bath (KCB) ===
Military Division

- Admiral Sir Erasmus Ommanney, CB (Retired)
- Admiral St George Caulfield d'Arcy-Irvine, CB (Retired)
- Vice-Admiral Hilary Gustavus Andoe, CB
- Vice-Admiral Arthur Knyvet Wilson, VC, CB
- Vice-Admiral Archibald Lucius Douglas
- Vice-Admiral Sir Gerard Henry Uctred Noel, KCMG
- Rear-Admiral Arthur William Moore, CB, CMG
- General Samuel James Graham, CB (Retired)
- Major-General John Frederick Crease, CB (Retired)
- Inspector-General of Hospitals and Fleets John Denis Macdonald, MD, Royal Navy (Retired)
- Chief Inspector of Machinery William Eames, Royal Navy (Retired)
- Chief Inspector of Machinery Henry Benbow, Royal Navy, DSO (Retired)
- Paymaster-in-Chief James William Murray Ashby, CB (Retired)
- Fleet Paymaster Frederick Cleeve, CB (Retired)
- Surgeon-General John Andrew Woolfryes, MD, CB, CMG, Honorary Physician to the King
- Lieutenant-General Alexander Robert Badcock, CB, CSI, Indian Staff Corps
- Surgeon-General Annesley Charles Castriott de Renzy, CB, Indian Medical Service (Retired)
- General Rowley Sale Sale-Hil, CB, Unemployed Supernumerary list, Indian Staff Corps
- Lieutenant-General Sir Montagu Gilbert Gerrard, KCSI, CB, Indian Staff Corps
- Major-General (Honorary) Alexander Bruce Tulloch, CB, CMG
- Major-General Reginald Thomas Thynne, CB
- Major-General Reginald Arthur James Talbot, CB
- Major-General Sir Edward Stedman, KCIE, CB, Indian Staff Corps
- Lieutenant-General Thomas Kelly-Kenny, CB
- Major-General Alfred Edward Turner, CB
- Colonel (ranking as Major-General) John Steevens, CB
- Surgeon-General (ranking as Lieutenant-General) William Taylor, MD, CB, Honorary Physician to the King

Civil Division

- Richard Davis Awdry, CB, Accountant General of the Royal Navy
- Bernard Eric Barrington, CB
- Francis Leveson Bertie, Assistant Under-Secretary of State, Foreign Office
- Honorary Colonel Charles Gervais Boxall, CB, 1st Sussex Royal Garrison Artillery (Volunteers)
- Lieutenant-Colonel and Honorary Colonel Robert Bridgford, CB, late 2nd Volunteer Battalion, Manchester Regiment
- Sir William Selby Church, 1st Baronet, MD, President of the Royal College of Physicians
- Clinton Edward Dawkins, CB, chairman of the recent Committee upon the administration of the War Office
- Thomas Henry Elliott, CB, Secretary to the Board of Agriculture
- Reginald Baliol Brett, 2nd Viscount Esher, KCVO, CB, Secretary to His Majesty's Office of Works
- John Lowndes Gorst, CB, Financial Adviser to the Egyptian Government
- Henry John Lowndes Graham, CB, Clerk of the Parliaments
- Schomberg Kerr McDonnell, CVO, CB
- Henry James van Sittart Neale, CB, Assistant Secretary to the Admiralty
- Major Henry Pilkington, CB, Royal Engineers
- Alfred de Bock Porter, CB, Secretary to the Ecclesiastical Commission
- Professor William Ramsay, FRS
- Evelyn John Ruggles-Brise, CB, Chairman of the Prison Commission
- Horace A. D. Seymour, Deputy Master of the Royal Mint, CB (he died before the list was gazetted and was never knighted, his widow was granted the rank of a knight′s widow)
- Honorary Colonel Alfred Plantagenet Frederick Charles Somerset, CB, 7th Battalion, Rifle Brigade (Prince Consort's Own)
- Leslie Stephen
- Colonel Arthur Pendarves Vivian, CB, South Wales Borders Volunteer Infantry Brigade
- George Whitehouse, Engineer-in-Chief of the Uganda Railway
- Henry Francis Redhead Yorke, CB, Director of Victualling, Royal Navy

=== Companions of the Order of the Bath (CB) ===
Military division

- Captain Edward Harpur Gamble, Royal Navy
- Captain Sir George John Scott Warrender, Baronet, Royal Navy
- Captain Christopher George Francis Maurice Cradock, Royal Navy
- Lieutenant-Colonel George Thorp Onslow, Royal Marine Light Infantry
- Lieutenant-Colonel Herbert Cecil Money, Royal Marine Light Infantry
- Major and Brevet Lieutenant-Colonel Edward Vyvyan Luke, Royal Marine Light Infantry
- Major and Brevet Lieutenant-Colonel George Grey Aston, Royal Marine Artillery
- Fleet Surgeon James Porter, MB
- Fleet Paymaster Francis Cooke Alton
- Paymaster-in-Chief John Samuel Moore (Retired)
- Lieutenant-General John Fletcher Owen, Royal Artillery
- Major-General George Salis-Schwabe
- Colonel Joseph Henry Laye, CVO
- Colonel Francis Edward Mulcahy, Army Ordnance Department
- Colonel O'Moore Creagh, VC, Indian Staff Corps
- Colonel John Davidson, Indian Staff Corps
- Colonel William Edmund Franklyn
- Colonel Frederick Stapleton Gwatkin, Indian Staff Corps
- Colonel Alfred Robert Martin, Indian Staff Corps
- Colonel Charles Wemyss Muir, CIE, Indian Staff Corps
- Colonel William Robert Le Geyt Anderson, Indian Staff Corps
- Lieutenant-Colonel Patrick Fenelon O'Connor, Indian Medical Service
- Lieutenant-Colonel Arthur Davidson, CVO, Equerry to the King
- Lieutenant-Colonel Robert Ramsay Napier Sturt, Indian Staff Corps

Civil division

- Sir John Henry Bergne, KCMG, Foreign Office
- William Patrick Byrne, Home Office
- Heffernan Fritz James Joseph John Considine, Deputy Inspector-General, Royal Irish Constabulary
- Captain Fritz Hauch Eden Crowe, RN, His Majesty's Consul-General, Lourenco Marques
- Alan Cole, Board of Education
- Hugh Bertram Cox, Assistant Under-Secretary of State, Colonial Office
- Major Patrick George Craigie, Assistant Secretary, Board of Agriculture
- Henry James Gibson, Assistant Accountant-General, War Office
- Sir Gabriel Prior Goldney, 2nd Baronet, City Remembrancer
- Lieutenant-Colonel John Lane Harrington, CVO, His Majesty's Agent and Consul-General in Abyssinia
- Honorary Commander John Howson, RNR
- Hartmann Wolfgang Just, CMG, Colonial Office
- Horace Cecil Monro, Assistant Secretary, Local Government Board
- Robert Laurie Morant, Board of Education
- George Peter Martin, RN, late Deputy Judge Advocate of the Fleet
- Frank Thomas Marzials, Account-General of the Army
- Augustus Henry Oakes, Chief Librarian, Foreign Office
- Frederick Sydney Parry, Treasury
- Douglas Close Richmond, Comptroller and Auditor-General
- Ronald Ross, FRS, FRCS
- George Watson Smyth, Assistant Secretary, General Post Office
- Lieutenant-Colonel James Hayes Sadler, His Majesty's Commissioner for the Uganda Protectorate
- Benjamin Arthur Whitelegge, MD, FRCP, Chief Inspector of Factories
- Colonel Edward Raban, Royal Engineers
- Charles Colson
- Sir James Williamson, Director of Dockyards
- James Brown Marshall
- George Crocker
- Richard Jago Butler
- William Winsland Chilcott, Chief Inspector of Machinery, Royal Navy
- William George Littlejohns, Chief Inspector of Machinery, Royal Navy
- Captain George Stanley, Royal Navy (Retired)
- James Robert Clark, Naval Instructor, Royal Navy
- Arthur Mason Worthington, FRS, MA
- Duncan Hilston, MD, Inspector-General of Hospitals and Fleets, Royal Navy (Retired)
- Robert Grant, MB, Inspector-General of Hospitals and Fleets, Royal Navy
- Lieutenant Herbert James Haddock, Royal Naval Reserve
- Lieutenant Melville Willis Campbell Hepworth, Royal Naval Reserve (Retired)
- William Munro Ross, Royal Naval Reserve
- Colonel Robert Auld
- Colonel Charles Moore Watson, CMG, late Royal Engineers
- Colonel Robert Arthur Montgomery
- Colonel William Dunne, Army Service Corps
- Lieutenant-Colonel Charles Frederick Hadden
- Lieutenant-Colonel and Honorary Colonel Alfred Thrale Perkins, 3rd (Militia) Battalion, Welch Regiment
- Lieutenant-Colonel and Honorary Colonel Maitland Moore-Lane (Honorary Lieutenant-Colonel, retired pay), The Duke of Connaught's Own Hampshire and Isle of Wight Royal Garrison Artillery (Militia)
- Lieutenant-Colonel Sir James Richardson Andrew Clark, Baronet (Brevet Major), Royal Army Medical Corps (Militia)
- Lieutenant-Colonel and Honorary Colonel Clement Molyneux Royds, Duke of Lancaster's Own Imperial Yeomanry
- Lieutenant-Colonel Sir Herbert Lloyd Watkin Williams-Wynn, Baronet, Montgomeryshire Imperial Yeomanry
- Lieutenant-Colonel and Honorary Colonel John Blencowe Cookson, Northumberland Hussars Imperial Yeomanry
- Lieutenant-Colonel and Honorary Colonel Michael B. Pearson, 2nd Middlesex Royal Garrison Artillery (Volunteers)
- Lieutenant-Colonel Commandant and Honorary Colonel Frederick Campbell, 1st Argyll and Bute Royal Garrison Artillery (Volunteers)
- Lieutenant-Colonel and Honorary Colonel Edwin Vaux, 1st Durham Royal Garrison Artillery (Volunteers)
- Lieutenant-Colonel and Honorary Colonel William Mathwin Angus, 1st Newcastle-on-Tyne Royal Garrison Artillery (Volunteers)
- Lieutenant-Colonel and Honorary Colonel Richard K. Birley, 7th Lancaster (the Manchester Artillery) Royal Garrison Artillery (Volunteers)
- Lieutenant-Colonel and Honorary Colonel Edward Thomas Davenant Cotton-Jodrell, 2nd Cheshire (Railway) Royal Engineers (Volunteers)
- Lieutenant-Colonel and Honorary Colonel Robert Henry Anstice (Major, retired pay), 1st Aberdeenshire Royal Engineers (Volunteers)
- Lieutenant-Colonel Commandant and Honorary Colonel Robert William Edis, 20th Middlesex (Artists′) Rifle Volunteer Corps
- Lieutenant-Colonel Commandant and Honorary Colonel Thomas Mitchell, 2nd Volunteer Battalion the East Lancashire Regiment
- Lieutenant-Colonel and Honorary Colonel Henry Samuel Hall, 2nd Volunteer Battalion, the Oxfordshire Light Infantry
- Lieutenant-Colonel and Honorary Colonel William Henry Campion, 2nd Volunteer Battalion, the Royal Sussex Regiment
- Lieutenant-Colonel and Honorary Colonel John Eaton, 3rd Volunteer Battalion, the Manchester Regiment
- Lieutenant-Colonel and Honorary Colonel Sir John Henry Kennaway, Baronet, 3rd Volunteer Battalion, the Devonshire Regiment
- Lieutenant-Colonel George Thomas Beatson, MD, the Glasgow Companies, Royal Army Medical Corps (Volunteers)
- Lieutenant-Colonel and Honorary Colonel James Neilson, Lanarkshire (Queen's Own Royal Glasgow) Imperial Yeomanry
- Lieutenant-Colonel and Honorary Colonel Henry Frederick Swan, 2nd Volunteer Battalion, the Northumberland Fusiliers
- Honorary Colonel Henry Bourchier Osborne Savile (Captain, retired pay), 1st Gloucestershire Royal Garrison Artillery (Volunteers)
- Honorary Colonel Stanley George Bird, 1st Middlsex (Victoria and St George's) Volunteer Rifle Corps
- Lieutenant-Colonel and Honorary Colonel Edward Matthey, late 1st London Volunteer Rifle Corps
- Lieutenant-Colonel and Honorary Colonel Charles Rivers Bulkeley, late 4th Battalion, the Oxfordshire Light Infantry
- Lieutenant-Colonel and Honorary Colonel Francis McDonnell, late Royal Monmouthshire Royal Engineers (Militia)
- Honorary Colonel Robert Joseph Pratt Saunders, the Mid-Ulster Royal Garrison Artillery (Militia)
- Honorary Colonel Gordon Maynard Gordon-Ives, 18th Middlesex Volunteer Rifle Corps

== Order of the Star of India ==
Order of the Star of India ribbon

=== Knight Commander of the Order of the Star of India (KCSI) ===
- Lieutenant-Colonel David William Keith Barr, CSI, Indian Staff Corps, resident at Hyderabad
- Henry John Stedman Cotton, CSI, Indian Civil Service, Chief Commissioner of Assam
- Amaravati Seshayya Sastri, CSI, of Madras

=== Companion of the Order of the Star of india (CSI) ===
- Thomas Raleigh, Ordinary Member of the Council of the Governor-General
- James Thomson, Indian Civil Service, Member of the Council of the Governor of Madras
- Joseph Bampfylde Fuller, CIE, Indian Civil Service, Officiating Chief Commissioner in Assam
- Lieutenant-Colonel Arthur Parry Thornton, Indian Staff Corps, late Officiating Agent to the Governor-General, in Rajputana Agency
- Hartley Kennedy, Commissioner of Police, Bombay
- Edward Charles Ozanne, Indian Civil Service (retired), Bombay
- Edwin Grant Burls, Director-General of Stores, India Office

== Order of Saint Michael and Saint George ==
Order of St Michael and St George ribbon

=== Knight Grand Cross of the Order of St Michael and St George (GCMG) ===
- Sir John Gordon Sprigg, KCMG, Prime Minister of the Cape of Good Hope
- Edmund Barton, KC, Prime Minister of the Commonwealth of Australia
- Sir Edwin Henry Egerton, KCB, His Majesty's Minister at Athens
- Sir Ernest Mason Satow, KCMG, His Majesty's Minister at Pekin

=== Knight Commander of the Order of St Michael and St George (KCMG) ===
- Major Matthew Nathan, Royal Engineers, CMG, Governor and Commander-in-Chief of the Gold Coast Colony
- His Honour Daniel Hunter McMillan, Lieutenant Governor of the province of Manitoba, in Canada
- Neil Elliot Lewis, MA, BCL, CMG, Prime Minister of the State of Tasmania
- Frederick William Holder, Speaker of the House of Representatives of the Commonwealth of Australia
- John See, Prime Minister of the State of New South Wales
- Alexander James Peacock, late Prime Minister of the State of Victoria
- Frederick William Borden, MD, Minister of Militia and Defence of the Dominion of Canada
- William Mulock, KC, LLD, MA, Postmaster General of the Dominion of Canada
- Edmund Constantine Henry Phipps, CB, His Majesty's Minister at Brussels, for services in connection with the Sugar conference
- Michael Henry Herbert, CB, His Majesty's Ambassador at Washington
- Commodore Francis Powell, CB, Royal Navy, for services in China
- Pelham Laird Warren, CMG, His Majesty's Consul-General at Shanghai, for services in China
- Surgeon-General Horace Henderson Pinching, Head of the Sanitary Department in Cairo
- George Mackenzie, CB, for services in connection with Persia
- Francis Langford O'Callaghan, CSI, CIE, managing director of the Uganda Railway

=== Companion of the Order of St Michael and St George (CMG) ===
- Robert Armitage Sterndale, Governor and Commander-in-Chief of the Island of St Helena
- William Lamond Allardyce, Administrator of the Government of Fiji, assistant Colonial Secretary and Receiver-General
- Brevet Colonel (local Major-General) Sir John Grenfell Maxwell, KCB, DSO, for services rendered while Military Governor of Pretoria
- William McCulloch, late Minister of Health and public Works of the State of Victoria
- Captain George Augustus Giffard, Royal Navy for services as Senior Naval Officer engaged in the protection of the Newfoundland Fisheries
- Arthur Ashley Parson, of the Colonial Office, for services as one of the British Delegates at the Sugar Bounties Conference, 1901-02
- William Hepworth Mercer, one of the Crown Agents for the Colonies, for services as Secretary of the Pacific Cable Committees
- Henry Francis Wilson, MA, Secretary to the Administration of the Orange River Colony
- Edward Rawle Drayton, Colonial Secretary and registrar-General of the Island of Grenada
- Anthony Musgrave, Government Secretary of the Possession of British New Guinea
- John Kemys George Thomas Spencer-Churchill, Colonial Secretary of the Bahama Islands
- Robert Wilson Levers, MA, Government Agent of the Northern Province of the Island of Ceylon
- Charles Riby Williams, Treasurer of the Gold Coast colony
- Horace Major Brandford Griffith, Treasurer of the Colony of The Gambia
- Edward Deshon, Auditor-General of the State of Queensland
- Edmund Fosbery, Inspector-General of Police of the State of New South Wales
- George Thompson Hare, Secretary for Chinese Affairs for the Federation of the Protected States of the Malay Peninsula
- Lieutenant-Colonel Frederick White, Comptroller of the North-West Mounted Police in Canada
- Edward Fortescue Wright, Inspector-General of Police and Prisons of the Island of Jamaica
- Lieutenant-Colonel Arthur Percy Sherwood, Commissioner of Police in Canada
- George Lancelot Eyles, Consulting Engineer for Railways to the Government of the Colony of the Cape of Good Hope, and to the Crown Agents for the Colonies
- John Brown, M.Inst.C.E., Engineer-in-Chief, Government Railways of the Colony of the Cape of Good Hope
- Haslitt Michael Beatty, Chief Locomotive Superintendent, Government Railways of the Colony of the Cape of Good Hope
- William Petch Hewby, Resident of the First Class in the Protectorate of Northern Nigeria
- Frederick Seton James, Divisional Commissioner in the Protectorate of Southern Nigeria
- Lieutenant Francis Bartley Henderson, Royal Navy, DSO, District Commissioner in Ashanti Protectorate
- Charles George Harland Bell, late Civil Commissioner and resident Magistrate, Mafeking, in the Colony of the Cape of Good Hope
- Solomon Dias Bandaranaike, Maha Mudaliyar of the Island of Ceylon
- Ricardo Micallef, Comptroller of Charitable Institutions in the Island of Malta
- Joseph Baynes, Member of the Legislative Assembly of the Colony of Natal
- Robert Harris, President of the Royal Canadian Academy
- Richard Darrell Darrell, Assistant Justice of the Court of General Assize of the Bermuda Islands
- William Kellman Chandler, LLD, Master in Chancery and Senior Judge of the Assistant Court of Appeal of the Island of Barbados
- Ernest Leslie Acutt, Mayor of Durban
- John William Leonard, on retirement as Chief Clerk and Chief Accountant in the office of the Crown Agents for the Colonies
- Gustave Albert Ritter, Unofficial Member of the Council of Government of the Colony of Mauritius
- Ho Kai, Unofficial Member of the Legislative Council of the Colony of Hong Kong
- James Miller Farquharson, Custos of the Parish of St. James, in the Island of Jamaica
- John Emrys Evans, formerly British Vice-Consul at Johannesburg, for services rendered in South Africa
- James Donnan, on retirement as Master Attendant, Colombo, in the Island of Ceylon
- Henry Mitchell Hull, Assistant Colonial Secretary of the Gold Coast Colony
- James Bryant Lindley, in recognition of services rendered in connection with Refugees in South Africa
- George Francis Birt Jenner, His Majesty's Minister in Central America
- Colonel James Moncrieff Grierson, Royal Artillery, CB, MVO, late Military Attaché to His Majesty's Embassy in Berlin
- Robert Drummond Hay, His Majesty's Consul-General at Beirut
- Henri Angst, His Majesty's Consul-General at Zurich
- William John Archer, His Majesty's Consul at Bangkok
- Frederick John Jackson, CB, Deputy-Commissioner in the East Africa Protectorate
- Captain Harry Edward Spiller Cordeaux, His Majesty's Vice-Consul at Berbera
- Major Percy Molesworth Sykes, 2nd Dragoon Guards, for services rendered while His Majesty's Consul for Kerman and Balochistan
- Captain Arthur Calvert Clarke, Royal Navy, for services in China
- Captain Chapman James Clare, South Australian Naval Defence Force, for services in China
- Commander Ernest Frederic Augustus Gaunt, Royal Navy, for services in China
- Commander Percy Cullen, Royal Navy, for services in the British Central Africa Protectorate

It had been the King's intention to have conferred the Companionship of the Order of St Michael and St George on the late George Leake, KC, Premier of the State of Western Australia

=== Honorary Companion of the Order of St Michael and St George ===
- Herr Ignaz Brüll, His Majesty's Consul at Budapest

== Order of the Indian Empire ==
Order of the Indian Empire Ribbon

=== Knights Grand Commander of the Order of the Indian Empire (GCIE) ===
- His Highness Sir Sultan Muhammad Shah, Aga Khan, KCIE, of Bombay
- Sir Henry Waterfield, KCSI, CB, Secretary in the Financial Department of the India Office

=== Knights Commander of the Order of the Indian Empire (KCIE) ===
- His Highness Maharaja Dhiraj Sipahdar-ul-Mulk Malkan Singh Bahadur of Charkhari, in Bundelkhand
- Maharaja Rameshwar Singh Bahadur of Darbhanga
- Thomas Higham., CIE, Secretary to the Government of India in the Public Works Department, Irrigation Branch
- Colonel Samuel Swinton Jacob, CIE, Indian Staff Corps, Superintending Engineer, Jaipur

=== Honorary Knight Commander of the Order of the Indian Empire ===
- His Excellency Hossein Qoli Khan, Mokhber-ol Douleh II (since 1897; known before under his previous title "Mukhber-ul-Mulk"), Persian Minister of Telegraphs

=== Companion of the Order of the Indian Empire (CIE) ===
- Rao Bahadur C. Jambulingam Mudaliar, Additional Member of the Council of the Governor of Fort St. George (Madras), for making Laws and Regulations
- Alexander Porteous, Indian Civil Service
- Lieutenant-Colonel Thomas Elwood Lindsay Bate, Indian Medical Service
- Lockhart Matthew St. Clair, Superintending Engineer and Officiating Secretary to the Chief Commissioners of the Central Provinces, in the Public Works Department
- John Benton, lately Officiating Chief Engineer and Secretary to the Government of Burma, in the Public Works Department
- Marshall Reid, of Bombay
- Rao Bahadur Pandit Sukhdeo Parshad, Member of the State Council of Jodhpur, in Rajputana
- Stuart Mitford Fraser, Indian Civil Service
- John Gordon Lorimer, Indian Civil Service
- Major Herbert Lionel Showers, Indian Staff Corps, Political Agent, Kalat
- Major Percy Zachariah Cox, Indian Staff Corps, Political Agent, Muscat
- Babu Nalin Bihari Sircar, a Commissioner for the Port of Calcutta
- Major-General Francis Edward Archibald Chamier, Honorary Secretary to the Stranger's Home for Asiatics

== Kaisar-i-Hind Medal ==
Kaisar-i-Hind Medal ribbon

Gold medal

- Raja Bhagwan Bakhsh Singh of Amethi, Sultanpur, Oudh
- John Montriou Campion, Secretary to the Government of the Punjab, in the Public Works Department
- Captain Thomas William Archer Fullerton, MB, Indian Medical Service
- Wilfred Henry Luck, District Superintendent of Police, Khandesh, Bombay Presidency
- Charles Evelyn Arbuthnot Evelyn Oldham, Indian Civil Service
- Lieutenant-Colonel John Leopold Poynder, Indian Medical Service
- Taw Sein Ko, MRAS, FAI, FSA, Government Archaeologist, Burma
- Edgar Thurston, LRCP, Superintendent, Government Central Museum, Madras

== Imperial Service Order ==
Imperial Service Order ribbon

== Appointments in the Army ==
=== Field Marshals ===
- General Sir Henry Wylie Norman, GCB, GCMG, CIE, Indian Staff Corps, Governor of the Royal Hospital Chelsea
- General Arthur William Patrick Albert, Duke of Connaught and Strathearn, KG, KT, KP, GCB, GCSI, GCMG, GCIE, GCVO, Commanding the Forces in Ireland and Commander Third Army Corps

=== General ===
- George Frederick Ernest Albert, Prince of Wales, KG, KT, KP, GCMG, GCVO,

=== Aides-de-camp to the King ===
Yeomanry

- Lieutenant-Colonel and Honorary Colonel Aldred Lumley, 10th Earl of Scarbrough, Yorkshire Dragoons (Queen's Own) Yeomanry
- Lieutenant-Colonel and Honorary Colonel Hugh Seymour, 6th Marquess of Hertford, Warwickshire Imperial Yeomanry

Militia

- Lieutenant-Colonel and Honorary Colonel Lord Algernon Malcolm Arthur Percy (Colonel in the Volunteer Force), 5th Battalion the Northumberland Fusiliers and Tyne Volunteer Infantry Brigade
- Lieutenant-Colonel Sir Hector Munro, 11th Baronet, 3rd Battalion Seaforth Highlanders (Ross-shire Buffs, The Duke of Albany's)

Volunteers

- Lieutenant-Colonel and Honorary Colonel Ernest Villiers, 1st Surrey (South London) Volunteer Rifle Corps
- Lieutenant-Colonel Commandant George Edward John Mowbray Rous, 3rd Earl of Stradbroke, 1st Norfolk Garrison Artillery (Volunteers)
