= William Archer =

William or Bill Archer may refer to:

- William Archer (British politician) (1677–1739), British politician
- William S. Archer (1789–1855), U.S. Senator and Representative from Virginia
- William Beatty Archer (1793–1870), Illinois politician and businessman
- William Archer (architect) (1820–1874), Tasmanian architect, naturalist, and politician
- William Archer (jockey, born 1826) (1826–1889), British jockey who rode in 9 Grand Nationals
- William Archer (naturalist) (1830–1897), Irish naturalist and microscopist especially interested in Protozoa and Desmids
- William Archer (New South Wales politician) (1831–1925), member of the New South Wales Legislative Assembly
- William Archer (critic) (1856–1924), Scottish dramatic critic and translator of Ibsen
- William John Archer (1861–1934), British colonial judge and diplomat
- William Archer (jockey, died 1878), British jockey killed in a fall at Cheltenham
- Bill Archer (footballer, born 1880) (1880–1962), English footballer, see List of Bury F.C. players (1–24 appearances)
- William Andrew Archer (1894–1973), American economic botanist and plant collector
- William Archer (Toronto politician) (1919–2005), Canadian municipal politician
- Bill Archer (1928–2026), U.S. Representative from Texas
- Bill Archer (businessman), British businessman

== See also ==
- Archer family
