= Andrew Archer =

Andrew Archer may refer to:

- Andrew Archer (1659–1741), English Member of Parliament for Warwickshire
- Andrew Archer, 2nd Baron Archer (1736–1778), British Member of Parliament for Bramber and Coventry
- Andy Archer (radio presenter) (born 1946), British radio presenter, active from the 1960s to the 2010s
- Andy Archer (GH Night Shift), a minor character from the American daytime soap opera General Hospital and General Hospital: Night Shift

== See also ==
- William Andrew Archer (1894–1973), American botanist and taxonomist
