= Silver standard =

Monetary system

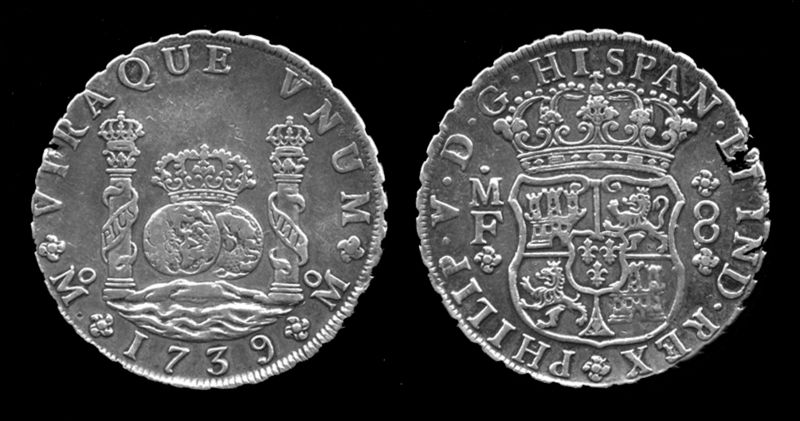
The Spanish silver dollar created a global silver standard from the 16th to 19th centuries.

The silver standard (Note: The silver standard is also sometimes known as silver metallism and silver monometallism.) is a monetary system in which the standard economic unit of account is a fixed weight of silver. Silver was far more widespread than gold as the monetary standard worldwide, from the Sumerians c. 3000 BC until 1873. Following the discovery in the 16th century of large deposits of silver at the Cerro Rico in Potosí, Bolivia, an international silver standard came into existence in conjunction with the Spanish pieces of eight. These silver dollar coins were an international trading currency for nearly four hundred years.

The move away from the silver to the gold standard began in the 18th century when Great Britain set the gold guinea’s price in silver higher than international prices, on the recommendation of Sir Isaac Newton, thus attracting gold and putting Great Britain on a de facto gold standard. Great Britain formalised the gold standard in 1821 and introduced it to its colonies afterwards. Imperial Germany’s move to the gold standard in 1873 triggered the same move to the rest of Europe and the world for the next 35 years, leaving only China (and, until 1930, the French Indochinese piastre) on the silver standard. By 1935 China and the rest of the world abandoned the silver and gold standards, respectively, in favour of government fiat currencies pegged to the pound sterling or the U.S. dollar.

== Origins ==
The use of commodity money can be traced to the cultures of the Bronze Age c. 3300 BC, with bronze, silver, and gold being the most prominent. However, the first commodity to satisfy all the functions of money was silver under the Sumerians of Mesopotamia as early as 3100 BC. Shortly after they developed writing, c. 3300 BC, the Sumerians recorded the use of silver as the standard of value, c. 3100 to 2500 BC, along with barley. Sometime before 2500 BC, the silver shekel became their standard currency, with tablets recording the price of timber, grains, salaries, slaves, etc. in shekels.

For millennia, it was also silver, not gold, which was the real basis of the domestic economies: the foundation for most money-of-account systems, for payment of wages and salaries, and most local retail trade. In 14th to 15th century England, for instance, most highly paid skilled artisans earned 6d a day (six pence, or 5.4g silver in the mid-15th century), and a whole sheep cost 12d. So even the smallest gold coin, the quarter-noble of 20d (with 1.7g fine gold), was of little use for domestic trade.

Every day, economic activities were therefore conducted with silver as the standard of value and with silver serving as a medium of exchange for local, domestic, and even regional trade. Gold functioned as a medium for international trade and high-value transactions, but it generally fluctuated in price versus everyday silver money. Gold as the sole standard of value would not occur until after various developments occurring in England starting in the 18th century.

== History ==
=== Ancient Greece ===
The first metal used as a currency was silver, more than 4,000 years ago, when silver ingots were used in trade. During the heyday of the Athenian empire, the city's silver tetradrachm was the first coin to achieve "international standard" status in Mediterranean trade.

=== Great Britain ===
Great Britain's early use of the silver standard is still reflected in the name of its currency, the pound sterling, which traces its origins to the early Middle Ages, when King Offa of Mercia introduced a 'sterling' coin made by physically dividing a pound (mass) of silver in 240 parts. In practice, the weights of the coins was not consistent and 240 of them seldom added up to a full pound; there were no shilling or pound coins and the pound was used only as an accounting convenience.

In 1158, King Henry II introduced the Tealby penny. English currency was almost exclusively silver until 1344, when the gold noble was put into circulation. However, silver remained the legal basis for sterling until 1816.

In 1663, a new gold coinage was introduced based on the 22 carat fine guinea. Fixed in weight at 44 1/2 to the troy pound from 1670, this coin's value varied considerably until 1717, when it was fixed at 21 shillings (21/-, £1/1/-). However, this valuation overvalued gold relative to silver compared to other European countries. British merchants sent silver abroad in payments, while exports were paid for with gold. As a consequence, silver flowed out of the country and gold flowed in, leading to a situation where Great Britain was effectively on a gold standard. In 1816, the gold standard was adopted officially, with the silver standard reduced to 66 shillings (66/-, £3/6/-), rendering silver coins a "token" issue (i.e., not containing their value in precious metal).

The economic power of Great Britain was such that its adoption of a gold standard put pressure on other countries to follow suit.

=== Bohemia ===
Beginning in 1515, silver coins were minted at the silver mines at Joachimsthal - Jáchymov (St. Joachim's Valley) in Bohemia, now part of the Czech Republic. Although formally called Guldengroschen, they became known as Joachimsthaler, then shortened to thaler. The coins were widely circulated and became the model for silver thalers issued by other European countries. The word thaler became dollar in the English language.

=== Spanish Empire ===
Rich deposits of silver in southern Mexico and Guatemala allowed the Spaniards to mint great quantities of silver coins. The Spanish dollar was a Spanish coin, the real de a ocho and later peso, worth eight reals (hence the nickname "pieces of eight"), which was widely circulated during the 18th century.

By the American Revolution in 1775, Spanish dollars backed paper money authorized by the individual colonies and the Continental Congress. In addition to the American dollar, the 8-real coin became the basis for the Chinese yuan.

=== Germany ===
After its victory in the Franco-Prussian War (1870–71), Germany extracted a huge indemnity from France of £200,000,000 in gold and used it to join Britain on a gold standard. Germany's abandonment of the silver standard put further pressure on other countries to move to the gold standard.

=== United States ===
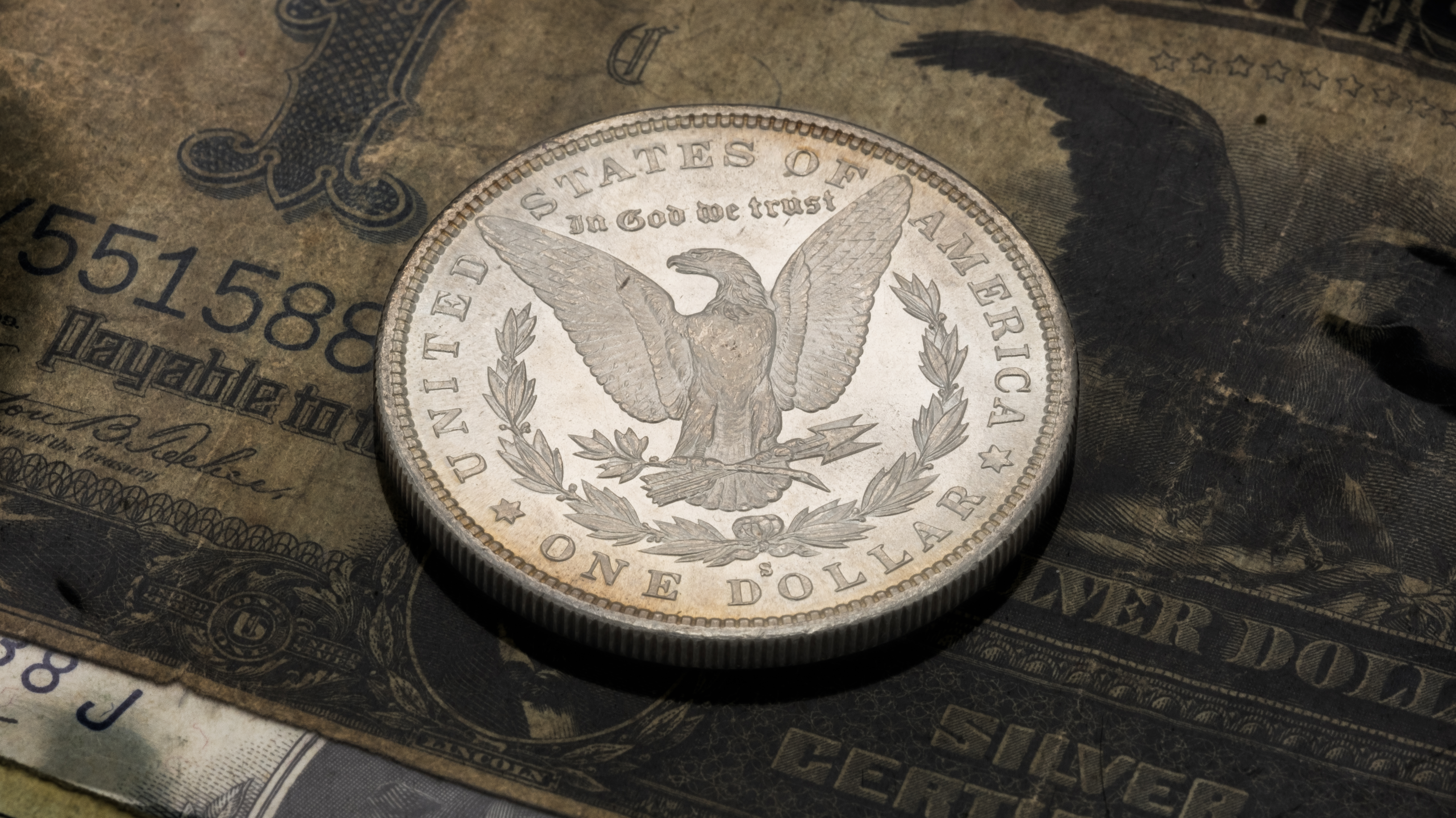
A US silver Morgan dollar atop a silver certificate

The United States adopted a silver standard based on the Spanish milled dollar in 1785. This was codified in the 1792 Mint and Coinage Act, and by the federal government's use of the Bank of the United States to hold its reserves, as well as establishing a fixed ratio of gold to the US dollar. This was, in effect, a derivative silver standard, since the bank was not required to keep silver to back all of its currency. This began a long series of attempts for America to create a bimetallic standard for the US dollar, which would continue until the 1920s. Gold and silver coins were legal tender, including the Spanish real. Due to the huge debt taken on by the US federal government to finance the Revolutionary War, silver coins struck by the government left circulation, and in 1806, President Jefferson suspended the minting of silver coins.

The US Treasury operated on a bimetal standard, doing business only in gold or silver coin as part of the Independent Treasury Act of 1846, which legally separated the accounts of the federal government from the banking system. However, the fixed rate of gold to silver overvalued silver in relation to the demand for gold to trade or borrow from England. Following Gresham's law, there was a significant increase of silver that entered the US economy. The United States traded with other silver nations, and the US experienced net outflows of gold. In 1853, the US reduced the silver weight of coins to keep them in circulation, and 1857 removed legal tender status from foreign coinage.

In 1857, a major financial crisis began, and some American banks suspended payment in silver. In 1861, the US government suspended payment in gold and silver, effectively ending the attempts to form a silver standard basis for the dollar. Through the 1860–1871 period, various attempts to resurrect bi-metallic standards were made, including one based on the gold and silver franc; however, with the rapid influx of silver from new deposits, the expectation of scarcity of silver ended.

The Coinage Act of 1873, enacted by the United States Congress in 1873, embraced the gold standard and de-monetised silver. Western mining interests and others who wanted silver in circulation labeled this measure the "Crime of '73". For about five years, gold was the only metallic standard in the United States until passage of the Bland–Allison Act on February 28, 1878, requiring the US Treasury to purchase domestic silver bullion to be minted into legal tender coins co-existent with gold coins. Silver Certificate Series 1878 was issued to join the gold certificates already in circulation.

By acts of Congress in 1933, including the Gold Reserve Act and the Silver Purchase Act of 1934, the domestic economy was taken off the gold standard and placed on the silver standard for the first time. The Treasury Department was re-empowered to issue paper currency redeemable in silver dollars and bullion, thereby divorcing the domestic economy from bimetallism and leaving it on the silver standard, although international settlements were still in gold.

This meant that for every ounce of silver in the U.S. Treasury's vaults, the U.S. government could continue to issue money against it. However, stamp overprints which were used under the Silver Purchase Act of 1934 to finance the nationalisation of U.S. silver mines, and also carried taxes ranging from 1¢ to $1,000, ended in 1943. These silver certificates were shredded upon redemption since the redeemed silver was no longer in the Treasury. With the world market price of silver having been more than $1.29 per troy ounce since 1960, silver began to flow out of the Treasury at an increasing rate. To slow the drain, President Kennedy ordered a halt to issuing $5 and $10 silver certificates in 1962. That left the $1 silver certificate as the only denomination being issued.

On June 4, 1963, Kennedy signed Public Law 88-36, which marked the beginning of the end for even the $1 silver certificate. The law authorized the Federal Reserve to issue $1 and $2 bills, and revoked the Silver Purchase Act of 1934, which authorized the Secretary of the Treasury to issue silver certificates (by now limited to the $1 denomination). As it would be several months before the new $1 Federal Reserve Notes could enter circulation in quantity, there was a need to issue silver certificates in the interim. As the Agricultural Adjustment Act of 1933 granted the right to issue silver certificates to the president, Kennedy issued Executive Order 11110 to delegate that authority to the Treasury Secretary during the transition.

Silver certificates continued to be issued until late 1963, when the $1 Federal Reserve Note was released into circulation. For several years, existing silver certificates could be redeemed for silver, but this practice was halted on June 24, 1968.

Finally, on August 15, 1971, President Richard Nixon announced that the United States would no longer redeem currency for gold or any other precious metal, forming the final step in abandoning the gold and silver standards. This announcement was part of the economic measures now known as the "Nixon Shock".

In response to the perceived shortcomings of U.S. monetary policy in the 21st century, some states have explored making silver and gold legal tender. In 2011, Utah legalized the settlement of debts using silver and gold. Other U.S. states have also explored their options to possibly make similar changes like Utah.

=== Imperial China ===
China had long used silver ingots as a medium of exchange, along with the cast copper-alloy cash. The use of silver ingots can be traced back as far as the Han dynasty (206 BC – 220 AD). But prior to the Song dynasty (960–1279), those silver ingots were used mainly for hoarding wealth. During the Song dynasty, for the first time in history, the government became the sole issuer of paper currency after 1024, but cast coins and silver ingots were still used as a medium of exchange. In the Shanyuan Treaty, signed with the state of Liao in 1004, Song China agreed to pay an annual indemnity or tribute of 100,000 tael of silver and 200,000 bolts of silk. This was the first time bulk silver in tael (Chinese: 銀兩) was used as indemnity in a treaty with a foreign power. Silver ingots had a shape similar to a boat or a Chinese shoe during the Yuan dynasty (1279–1368). This became an ordinary shape for silver ingots during the following centuries.

The use of silver as money was established at the very time of the Ming dynasty (1368–1644). Paper money was first issued in 1375 by the founder Hongwu Emperor amid the ban of silver as medium of exchange. But due to the increasing depreciation, the paper money became worthless and the ban on silver usage was finally lifted in 1436 (1st year of the Zhengtong Emperor). Meanwhile, silver was made much available through foreign trade with the Portuguese (through Macau) and the Spanish (through the Manila galleons), in the beginning of the 16th century. The great tax reform by the statesman Zhang Juzheng in 1581 (9th year of the Wanli Emperor) simplified the taxation and required all the tax and corvee to be paid in silver. This can be seen as an indication of the firm position of silver in the monetary system of the Ming. However, the reform would not have been a success or even feasible if the enormous amounts of silver had not been available through trade and imports from the Americas, mainly through the Spanish.

During the Qing dynasty (1644–1911), silver ingots were still used, but various foreign silver dollars had become popular in the Southern coastal region through foreign trade since the mid-Qing era. It was apparent that the silver ingots became awkward and more complicated to use vis à vis the foreign silver dollars, which could be counted easily, given their fixed specification and fineness of silver. However, the Qing dynasty very much resisted the idea of minting a silver coin of their own. It was not until late Qing, in 1890, that the first circulating silver coin was introduced by Guangdong province. The coin was at par with the Mexican peso, and soon this issue was emulated by other provinces. For these silver coins, the tael was still seen as the proper monetary unit, as the denomination of the coins were given as 0.72 tael (specifically: 7 mace and 2 candareens). Note for the treaties signed between the Qing dynasty and the foreign powers the indemnities were all in tael of silver, except for the Treaty of Nanking, where the silver dollar was indicated. (See the Treaties of Tientsin, Convention of Beijing, Treaty of Shimonoseki and Boxer Protocol). It was not until 1910 that the "yuan" (Chinese: 圓, literally "roundness"), was officially announced as the standard monetary unit. The yuan was subdivided into 10 jiao or 100 fen, and specified as 0.72 tael of 900 fineness silver. The next year, 1911, the so-called "Great Qing Silver Coin" one yuan (dollar) was issued, but soon after the dynasty was replaced by the Republic.

The silver standard was again adopted and codified in 1914 by the newly established republic, with one yuan still being equal to 0.72 tael of 900 fineness silver. After the Chinese Nationalist Party (Kuomintang) unified the country in 1928, the yuan was again announced as the standard unit in 1933, but this time the relationship of the yuan to the tael was abolished, as one yuan was now equal to 26.6971 grams of 880 fineness silver. In the same year, 1933, while most of the Western countries (especially Britain and USA) had left the gold standard because of the Great Depression, it was said that China almost avoided the depression entirely, mainly due to having stuck to the silver standard. However, the US silver purchase act of 1934 created an intolerable demand on China's silver coins, and so in the end the silver standard was officially abandoned in September 1935 in favour of the four Chinese national banks' "legal note" issues. China would be the last to abandon the silver standard, along with the British crown colony of Hong Kong.

China's use of silver as a medium of exchange is reflected in the name for bank "銀行" (literally "silver house" or "silver office") and for the precious metal and jewel dealer "銀樓" (literally "silver building" or "silver shop").

=== Republican China and Hong Kong ===
Republican China, along with the British colony of Hong Kong, would be the last to abandon the silver standard.

In October 1934, the National Government of Republic of China increased the silver-based export duty and adjusted the duty with a so-called "equalisation charge", making the duty based on foreign currencies. The Government later issued a new currency called fa-pi. These changes were responses to the deflation in China caused by the US Silver Purchase Program in 1933 after London Economic Conference. The US purchase of silver in the International market increase the price of silver, causing an outflow of silver in China who based the economy on silver standard currency, which forces China to abandon the silver standard.

Hong Kong abandoned the silver standard in September 1935. Hong Kong then adopted the gold exchange standard and the Hong Kong dollar took on the exact value of one shilling and three pence (1s 3d) sterling.

=== India ===
The Indian rupee is derived from the Rūpaya (silver is called rūpa in Sanskrit) a silver coin introduced by Sher Shah Suri during his reign from 1540 to 1545. Since this is around about the same time that the Spanish discovered silver at the Cerro Rico in Potosí, the silver value of the rupee maintained a stable relationship with gold right up until the early 1870s. From 1871, the value of silver depreciated relative to gold, due to the drop in demand for silver in the mints of Europe and North America, as those countries changed over to the gold standard. This had severe consequences for the rupee and it resulted in the fall of the Rupee. Following the Fowler report, India adopted the gold exchange standard in the year 1898, fixing the value of the rupee at exactly one shilling and four pence (1s 4d) sterling.

=== Persia ===
The dirham was a silver coin originally minted by the Persians. The Caliphates in the Islamic world adopted these coins, starting with Caliph Abd al-Malik (685–705). Silver remained the most common monetary metal used in ordinary transactions until the 20th century.

Safavid era

Gold coins were minted for the king, but these coins were more suitable for use and served as gifts on occasions, especially Nowruz. However, silver was a precious and high-quality currency for tax and commercial purposes. Silver coins were higher in comparison with many other countries. When the coin-masters of the coin melted the European coins or the crack, they were purified them before they were minted again in the form of Iranian currency.

Usually the weight of the coins was correct, so that businessmen and government agents used both for a major payment of bags containing a certain number of coins. These bags have a guaranteed value of 50 Toman. A special observer, Sarrafbashi, was in charge of the quality of coins inside the bags, which personally sealed them. This monitoring of money certainly survived until the end of the fourteenth century.

From the beginning of the Islamic Empire, the dinar was a monetary unit. In the year 1260, the Mughal was presented with the Toman, which in the words meant 10 thousands.

The word was originally used to refer to 10,000 dinars of gold. However, after the year 1500, during the Safavid dynasty, Toman was a unit for calculation, not a gold coin. In practice, the value of the Toman fluctuated and was not always equal to 10,000 dinars. Also, the Toman of Tabriz or Iraq was often four times the value of the Toman of Khorasan.

Exports of metal money from Iran in the seventeenth century were followed by sea and land, and generally more exports included coins to bullion. Given that the tendency toward gold to keep its value historically longer than the West in relation to silver in India, it was often preferable to export to India, since at least until the 1080s of the lunar year in India, and in particular the Cromandal (south-east coast India) had a better rate. However, almost always silver was preferred to trade with the East, although it naturally depended on the prices of silver and commodities in India.

Iran's rulers repeatedly issued orders against coin exports, but since the merchants could easily escape the regulations by bribing the officers, their results were temporary. During the Safavid period, the first ban on the coin occurred in 1618 during the reign of Shah Abbas I.

Afsharids

With the fall of the Safavid in 1723, their monetary policy continued to be maintained by Nader Shah, who maintained the same weight and purity for coinage between 1723 and 1741. In this year, instead of continuing to follow the pattern of the traditional Iranian criterion, he made a coin draw on India based on the pattern of India to simplify trade between the two countries.

Zand

Although Karim Khan was known as the "greatest ruler of Iran" since 1764 with broad, independent or semi-autonomous sectors, there was no monetary unity in the country. The regional monetary system continued to work even when the national mint began to beat coins of equal weight and purity.

Qajar

The advent of the Qajar dynasty began in the late eighteenth century with the same Safavid monetary system. In short, in this system, the common currency was coins that were manually multiplied in the mint of all major cities and managed by privileged holders who paid royalties. The value of money was theoretically based on their precious metal content, which was guaranteed by the government.

The Qajar period's monetary system was likewise pre-disintegrated and decentralised. There were two types of Iraqi and Tabrizi Tomans (used most of Iran) plus Tuman Khorasani (used in Eastern Iran).

Pahlavi

Following the fall of the value of silver in the late 1920s and the early 1930s, the Pahlavi government experienced a serious monetary crisis. The Pahlavi government first tried to redirect the gold standard by the March 28, 1930 law. But when faced with difficulties, the Qajars' short-term strategy was chosen; that is, to stay on the silver standard.

The law of March 13, 1932 stipulated that until the return to normal economic situation and the stability of the possibility of paying with gold or gold-based foreign currency suspended due to the economic crisis, the National Bank (Bank Melli Iran) was allowed to receive no silver coins or paper money in circulation which may be offered with a gold purchase (coin, bullion, or foreign currency). However, Bank Melli should pay Rial cash against paper money and nickel coins if there is a demand without limitation, for each coin in either Tehran or other provinces.

Although the paper money was very important in the Reza Shah government, older attitudes were still expected. For example, the idea that the metal is the base of real money is found in this rule of law that the paper money is backed by gold or foreign currency.

However, the passage to the new currency system was one of the achievements of Reza Shah's reign.

== Transition to gold standard ==
In 1717, the master of the Royal Mint, Sir Isaac Newton, introduced a new mint ratio as between silver and gold, and this had the effect of putting Britain onto a de facto gold standard. Following the Napoleonic Wars, the United Kingdom introduced the gold sovereign coin and formally adopted a gold standard in 1821. At the same time, revolutions in Latin America interrupted the supply of silver dollars (pieces of eight) that were being produced at the mints in Potosi, Mexico, and Lima, Peru.

The British gold standard initially extended to some of the British colonies, including the Australasian and Southern African colonies, but not to its North American colonies, British India, or to Southeast Asia. The Province of Canada adopted a gold standard in 1853, as did Newfoundland in 1865.

In 1873, Imperial Germany changed over to the gold standard in conjunction with the new gold mark coin. The United States changed over to gold de facto in the same year, and over the next 35 years, all other nations changed to gold, leaving only China and the British colonies of Hong Kong and Weihaiwei on the silver standard. By 1935, China and the rest of the world had abandoned the silver and gold standards, respectively, in favour of currencies pegged to the pound sterling and the U.S. dollar.

== Relative value of silver and gold ==
Since the time that silver was discovered by the Spanish in the New World in the 16th century, until the latter half of the 19th century, the value of gold in relation to silver maintained a relatively stable ratio of 15½:1. The reason for the subsequent sharp decline in the relative value of silver to gold has been attributed to Germany's decision to cease minting the silver thaler coins in 1871. On 23 November 1871, following the defeat of France in the Franco-Prussian War, Bismarck exacted one billion dollars in gold indemnity, and then proceeded to move Germany towards a new gold standard which came about on 9 July 1873 with the introduction of the gold mark.

It has also, however, been suggested by Nevada Senator John Percival Jones in 1876 in a speech to the US Senate, that the downward pressure on the market value of silver began somewhat earlier with the formation of the Latin Monetary Union in 1866. Jones argues that the Latin Monetary Union involved a partial demonetisation of silver.

Silver made a partial comeback in the first decade of the 20th century, such that the silver dollar coins of the Straits Settlements and silver peso coins of the Philippines had to be made smaller in size, and with a reduced silver content to prevent their silver value exceeding their recently established gold exchange value. An even larger rise in the price of silver after the First World War caused the Royal Mint in London to reduce the silver content of the sterling coinage. But silver never returned to the 15½:1 ratio of the first half of the 19th century, and the predominant long-term trend was that silver continued to decline in value against gold. Nowadays, the ratio concerning the value of gold, although variable, is more of the order of 70:1.

== Demonetization of Silver in Circulating Coinage ==
Because the term "silver standard" may refer to different institutional and functional dimensions, the table below records multiple milestones related specifically to the demonetization of silver in circulating coinage, rather than assigning a single termination date.

This table focuses exclusively on silver used in circulating coinage. Silver-backed paper instruments (e.g., silver certificates), which represent redemption or reserve mechanisms rather than metallic money itself, are excluded to avoid conflating coinage composition with currency convertibility. Accordingly, dates are presented across several dimensions, including legal or institutional reforms, changes in metallic content, the final issuance of silver coins intended for circulation, and the post-reform legal-tender and circulation status of legacy silver issues.

Timeline of Modern Silver Coin Issuance History in Different Country
Political entity	Start Year	Milestone	Last Issue	Coin Face Value	Last Issue Silver Content	Government Recall	Legacy Coins: Legal Tender	Post-Demonetization Circulation
Australia	1910	Introduction of Australian silver coinage	1966	50¢	80%	Yes	Yes	Residual circulation only
Austria	1857	Adoption of silver-based gulden system	1973	10 schilling	64%	Yes	No	None
Belgium	1832	Latin Monetary Union silver coinage	1948	50 ₣	83.5%	Yes	No	None
Canada	1858	Introduction of Canadian silver coinage	1968	25¢	50%	Yes	No	Residual circulation only
Czechoslovakia	1918	Establishment of Czechoslovak currency system	1953	50 koruna	50%	Yes	No	None
Denmark	1873	Scandinavian Monetary Union	1967	10 kroner	40%	Yes	No	Minimal
Estonia	1922	Introduction of kroon silver coinage	1936	2 Krooni	50%	Yes	No	None
Finland	1864	Adoption of silver markka	1967	10 markkaa	50%	Yes	No	Minimal
France	1795	Franc germinal / Latin Monetary Union	1969	10 ₣	83.5%	Yes	No	Minimal, rapidly hoarded
Germany	1871	German monetary unification	1974	5 Deutsche Mark	62.5%	Yes	No	None
Greece	1833	Introduction of drachma silver coinage	1969	30 drachmai	83.5%	Yes	No	Minimal
Hungary	1867	Austro-Hungarian silver currency system	1948	5 forint	64%	Yes	No	None
Italy	1861	Italian unification / Latin Monetary Union	1970	500 lire	83.5%	Yes	No	Minimal
Switzerland	1850	Federal Coinage Act establishing the Swiss franc/ Latin Monetary Union	1967	5 ₣	83.5%	Yes	No	Minimal; rapidly hoarded and withdrawn
Portugal	1911	Republican monetary reform	1969	50 escudos	65%	No	No	Minimal; rapidly hoarded and withdrawn
Japan	1871	New Currency Act (transition from bimetallism to gold standard)	1966	100 Yen	60%	Yes	No	No
Latvia	1922	Introduction of the Latvian lats with silver coinage under the Currency Law of 1922	1932	5 lati	83.5%	Yes	No	None
Netherlands	1954	Coinage Act of 1816 establishing the guilder with silver standard coinage	1967	2.5 gulden	72%	No	No	Rare
Norway	1875	Adoption of the Scandinavian Monetary Union (silver-based krone system)	1919	1 krone	80%	No	No	Minimal
New Zealand	1933	Introduction of New Zealand coinage with silver content replacing British issues	1946	1 crown	50%	No	No	Limited residual use
Poland	1924	Władysław Grabski currency reform introducing złoty silver coinage	1939	10 złotych	75%	Yes	No	Negligible
Romania	1867	Adoption of the leu under Latin Monetary Union principles	1944	500 lei	70%	Yes	No	Negligible
Sweden	1873	Scandinavian Monetary Union silver coinage system	1971	5 kronor	40%	No	No	rare
Spain	1868	Adoption of the peseta with silver coinage after monetary reform	1969	100 pesetas	80%	No	No	Minimal
British Empire	1816	Great Recoinage establishing gold standard; silver as token coinage	1946	Half-crown	50%	Yes	No	None
United States	1792	Coinage Act	1969	50¢	40%	No	Yes	Residual circulation only
China	1889	Qing dynasty coinage regulations authorizing the minting of machine-struck silver dollars	1935	$1	90%	Yes	No	Residual private circulation until 1949; limited bullion use until c. 1951.
Hong Kong	1866	Introduction of British colonial silver coinage (Hong Kong Mint)	1933	5¢	80%	Yes	No	Residual private holding only
Macau	1952	Introduction of pataca silver coinage for circulation	1971	5 MOP	65%	Yes	No	Minimal; quickly withdrawn
Korean Empire	1892	Monetary integration under Japanese influence	1907	₩1	90%	No	No	None after annexation
Taiwan	1895		1949	5 Jiao	72%	Yes	No	None

Pre-modern weight-based silver systems, such as the tael-based silver economy historically used in China, are not included in this table. Although silver functioned as a primary monetary standard in such systems, it circulated as bullion by weight rather than as standardized coinage, and therefore falls outside the scope of circulating silver coinage addressed here.

== See also ==
- Bimetallism
- Digital gold currency
- Executive Order 11110
- Free silver
- Full-reserve banking
- Fungibility
- Gold standard
- Legal tender
- Representative money
- Silverite
- Silver as an investment
- Silver certificate (United States)
- Silver coin
- Store of value
- United States one-dollar bill — details of the silver certificates of 1878–1963
