= George Thompson Hare =

British colonial administrator (1863-1906

George Thompson Hare CMG ISO
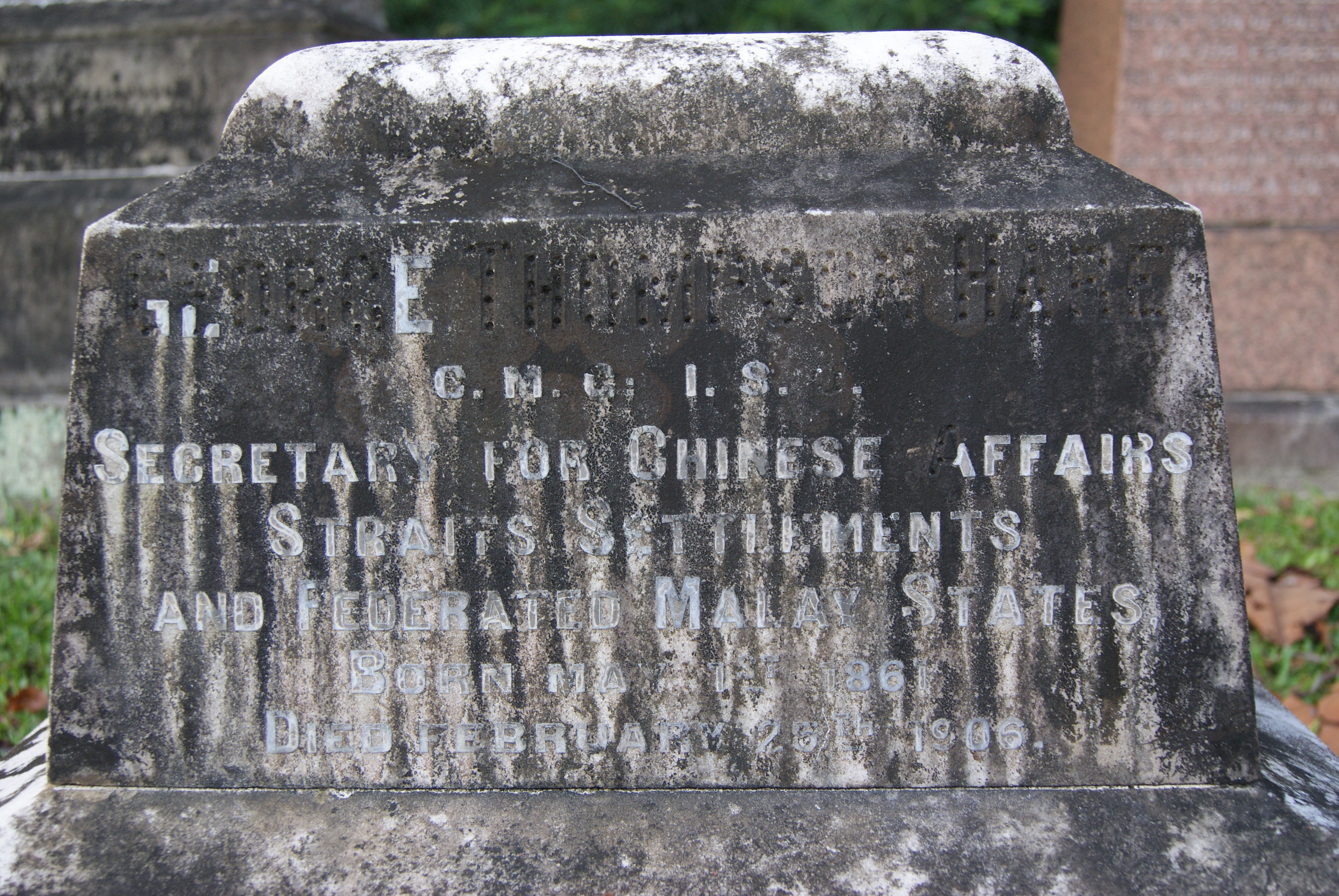
- Gravestone of George Thompson Hare, Fort Canning Green, Singapore

Chinese Protectorate, Straits Settlements and Federated Malay States
- In office 1887–1904

Personal details
- Born: 1 May 1863; Weymouth, Dorset
- Died: 25 February 1906 (aged 42); Singapore

George Thompson Hare CMG ISO (1 May 1863 – 25 February 1906) was a British Protector appointed by the British government who was responsible for administering the Chinese Protectorate charged with the well-being of ethnic Chinese residents in the Federated Malay States and the Straits Settlements.

== Early life and education ==
Hare was born on 1 May 1863 in Weymouth, Dorset, son of Richard Hare, solicitor. He was educated at Weymouth College, and Wadham College, Oxford where he was an exhibitioner.

== Career ==
In 1882, Hare joined the civil service of the Straits Settlements as a cadet and spent his first years studying the Hokkien language at Amoy. In 1884, he arrived in Singapore and for the next twelve years, except while briefly acting as District Officer and Magistrate, held various appointments in the Chinese Protectorate of the Straits Settlements mostly in Singapore and Penang, rising to head the organisation as Protector of Chinese. In 1897, he was appointed Chinese Secretary of the Federated Malay States based in Kuala Lumpur, and in 1903 became the first appointee to the newly created post of Secretary for Chinese affairs of the Federated Malay States and Straits Settlements.

As head of the Chinese Protectorate he was entrusted with the interests of the largest Chinese community in the British territories of the Far East. Speaking Chinese dialects fluently, he gained the trust of the Chinese community, working with them and familiarising himself with their customs and practices. He won the praise of Sir Frank Swettenham who wrote: "He visited every Chinese mine, plantation and village in the FMS and established a unique influence with the Chinese of all classes". He wrote papers on many subjects concerning the Chinese, and his knowledge of the revenue farm system, and the method and profits of the Chinese, enabled the government to greatly increase income from this source. Described as the most noted English authority on Chinese matters in the Straits Settlements and Federated Malay States, he also played a large part in implementing the government policy of suppressing the Chinese secret societies including the Gee Hin Society in Penang.

He was instrumental in the formation of a steamship company with a government subsidy of $50,000 Straits per annum to create the first direct link by steamship between China and the Federated Malay States. He promoted the introduction of Chinese padi planters to the country and introduced a salt making industry with the formation of a company. He established a home for the maintenance of Chinese women and children who had been sent from China for immoral purposes, and founded a college for the training of interpreters.

In 1901, he was sent on special service to British Weihaiwei to assist in the administration of the colony as commissioner and magistrate. After seven months he resumed his post as head of the Chinese Protectorate, retiring in 1905 due to ill health.

== Personal life and death ==
Hare married Li San at Canton in 1894. He died on 25 February 1906 of anaemia in Singapore, aged 42.

== Honours ==
Hare was appointed Companion of the Order of St Michael and St George (CMG) in the 1902 Coronation Honours, and was appointed Companion of the Imperial Service Order (ISO) in the 1904 Birthday Honours.
