= Francis Langford O'Callaghan =

Irish civil engineer (1839-1909)

Sir Francis Langford O'Callaghan KCMG
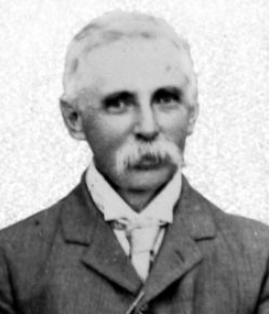
- Born: 22 July 1839; County Cork
- Died: 14 November 1909 (aged 70); Guildford
- Occupation: Civil engineer
- Years active: 1859-1903
- Children: 1 son

Sir Francis Langford O'Callaghan KCMG (22 July 1839 – 14 November 1909) was an Irish civil engineer who spent most of his career in the construction of railways in India.

== Early life and education ==
Francis Langford O'Callaghan was born in Drisheen, County Cork, Ireland on 22 July 1839. He was educated privately, and at Queen's College, Cork.

== Career ==
He trained as a civil engineer with Henry Conybeare from 1859 to 1862 whilst working on railway construction in Ireland and in South Wales.

In 1862, he joined the Indian Public Works Department, after competitive examination, and rose through various grades. He was appointed probationary Assistant Engineer on 13 June 1862, Executive Engineer on 1 April 1866, and Superintending Engineer (First Class) in March 1886. On 9 May 1889, he rose to the position of Chief Engineer (First Class) and Consulting Engineer to the Government of India for State Railways, and in 1892, he became Secretary to the Government of India Public Works Department. He retired from Indian service in 1894.

In September 1895, after returning to England, he was appointed by the Colonial Office as a managing member of the Uganda Railway Committee, and held the position until the committee was dissolved on 30 September 1903.

He built several State railways in India. In 1887 to 1889, he designed and partly constructed the railway through the Khojak Pass to the frontier with Afghanistan. A few years earlier, he received the C.I.E. for the construction of a bridge across the Indus at Attock, and later he received the C.S.I. for building a railway through the Bolan Pass to Quetta.

He became a member of the Institution of Civil Engineers in 1872. He was also a fellow of the Royal Geographical Society. He was a director of the Burma Railway Company and the Egyptian Delta Light Railway Company. He published in 1865 "Bidder's Earthwork Tables, intended and adapted for the Use of the Public Works Department in India".

== Personal life and death ==
O'Callaghan married Anna Powell in 1875 and they had a son. He died in Guildford on 14 November 1909, and was buried at Holy Trinity Church, Guildford.

== Honours ==
In the 1902 Coronation Honours, O'Callaghan was appointed Knight Commander of the Most Distinguished Order of St Michael and St George (KCMG). He was also awarded the Order of the Indian Empire (CIE) and the Order of the Star of India (CSI).
