= William Soulsby =

English barrister (1851–1937)

Sir William Soulsby
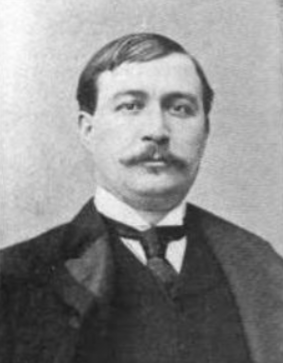
- In The Sketch, 9 January 1901

Private Secretuary to the Lord Mayors of London
- In office 1875–1931

Personal details
- Born: William Jameson Soulsby; 4 April 1851
- Died: 13 February 1937 (aged 85); London, England
- Education: City of London School; King's College, London
- Occupation: Barrister

Sir William Jameson Soulsby, KCVO, CB, CIE (4 April 1851 – 13 February 1937) was an English barrister who served as Private Secretary to the Lord Mayors of London for 55 years. The Times referred to him as "in a sense, the permanent Lord Mayor."

== Biography ==
Soulsby was the son of Matthew Soulsby, who worked at The Times. He was educated at the City of London School and gained his degree through evening classes at King's College, London. He was called to the bar by the Middle Temple in 1874. He became a law reporter with The Times, but in 1875 was appointed Private Secretary to the Lord Mayor in succession to Sir Somers Vine. He continued to practise as a barrister and to write for The Times. He unwillingly retired from Mansion House in 1931.

Soulsby was appointed Companion of the Order of the Bath (CB) in 1896 and was knighted in the 1902 Coronation Honours, receiving the accolade from King Edward VII at Buckingham Palace on 24 October that year. He was appointed Commander of the Royal Victorian Order (CVO) in the 1920 New Year Honours and Knight Commander of the Royal Victorian Order (KCVO) in the 1923 New Year Honours.

As part of his job he was also secretary of the Indian famine relief funds in 1877, 1897 and 1900, for which he was appointed Companion of the Order of the Indian Empire (CIE) in the 1901 New Year Honours.

On his golden jubilee as private secretary in 1925 he was offered, but declined, a baronetcy.

He died in London on 13 February 1937.

== Footnotes ==
Civic offices
Preceded by Sir Somers Vine	Private Secretary to the Lord Mayor of London; 1875–1931	Succeeded by T. Harvey Hull
