= Silverite =

Members of the free silver movement in the United States

The Silverites were members of a political movement in the United States in the late-19th century that advocated that silver should continue to be a monetary standard along with gold, as authorized under the Coinage Act of 1792. The Silverite coalition's famous slogan was "16 to 1" – that is, the ratio of sixteen ounces of silver equal in value to one ounce of gold, a ratio similar to that established in the Coinage Act of 1834. Silverites belonged to a number of political parties, including the Silver Party, Populist Party, Democratic Party, and the Silver Republican Party.

The Silverites advocated free coinage of silver. They wanted to replace the strict gold standard with silver, thereby allowing inflation of the money supply. Many Silverites were in the West, where silver was mined. Advocates predicted that if silver were used as the standard of money, they would be able to pay off all of their debt. The debt amount would stay the same but they would have more silver money with which to pay it.

The Silverites' main presidential candidate was William Jennings Bryan, whose famous Cross of Gold speech argued in their favor. He unsuccessfully ran for president several times.

Silverites were frequent targets of satire and ridicule in the 1896 election, especially from Republicans who warned that Bryan's free silver policy would trigger disastrous inflation. Republican cartoons mocked Bryan with slogans like "In God We Trust, With Bryan We Bust" and exaggerated scenarios such as chewing gum costing $800 due to devalued currency. The term Popocrat—a blend of Populist and Democrat—was coined by Republicans to mock the alliance between the Populist Party and Silverite Democrats. Harper’s Weekly satirically defined it as "government by pop," equating it with empty noise or fizzy soda.

Silverites, primarily composed of farmers and silver miners in the West, supported the free coinage of silver as a way to increase the money supply and combat deflation, which they believed would ease the burden of debt and stimulate the economy.

== Criticism ==
Economist Edward Atkinson argued that Silverites promoted reckless economic nationalism and anti-British sentiment, calling the idea of adopting silver simply to oppose Britain "one of the most damnable arguments" in the debate. Atkinson dismissed the 16-to-1 silver standard as economically irrational, writing that its supporters displayed "audacity and imbecility" by urging the U.S. to adopt silver regardless of global markets. He also warned that extreme Silverite policies could disrupt trade with major partners like Britain and Germany, harming American farmers who relied on those export markets.

== See also ==
- Bimetallism
- Bullionism
- Commodity money
- Free silver
- Monetary policy
