= Executive Order 12608 =

United States executive order

Executive Order 12608 was issued by Ronald Reagan on Sep 9, 1987.

== History ==
President Ronald Reagan issued Executive Order 12608 on September 9, 1987, as part of a general clean-up of executive orders. One part of E.O. 12608 specifically revoked the section (paragraph 1(j)) that were added to E.O. 10289 by Executive Order 11110. E.O. 11110 had been issued by President Kennedy in 1963, and is the subject of a conspiracy theory by author Jim Marrs. As that section was the only part of E. O. 11110 that was in effect, E.O. 12608 effectively revoked the entire Order.

== Impacts ==
Many executive orders governing the banking and finance system of the US were either modified or effectively terminated.
