= Freemen's Protective Silver Federation =

- Formation: 1894
- Founded at: Spokane, Washington
- Dissolved: 1920s
- Members: 800,000 (1896)
- Affiliations: Silver Party, Free Silver Movement

The Freemen's Protective Silver Federation was a fraternal order in the United States founded in the interests of the free silver movement at the height of its popularity in the mid-1890s.

The organization claimed as many as 800,000 members in 1896 and strictly adhered to populist ideals. While it was nationwide, it gained much notoriety in the state of Washington where it was accused of inciting violence and acting as a paramilitary organization. Lawyers and bankers were barred from obtaining membership within the federation.

In an effort to distance themselves from more bad press, members of the federation participated in the search for missing farmer Charles Gloystein of Mica, Washington in 1894, the disappearance of whom had been blamed on the organization by many.

The Freemen's Protective Silver Federation was dissolved by the early 1920s.

== See also ==
- Free silver
- Populism
