= Henry Waterfield =

British civil servant

Sir Henry Waterfield, GCIE, KCSI, CB (1837-1913) was a British civil servant who was private secretary to successive Secretaries of State for India, and for 23 years Financial Secretary in the India Office.

== Biography ==
Waterfield was born in 1837, and entered the civil service at a very young age, in the early 1850s. He went to the India Office in 1858, and worked there for 44 years, as private secretary to successive Secretaries of State for India, and in four different departments; the Military, Public Works, Revenue and Commerce, and Financial departments.

In 1879 he was appointed Financial Secretary, and served as such until he resigned in July 1902. During his tenure, in 1893 the Indian mints were closed to silver, following advice from the Indian Currency Committee. There were also debates about the contribution of the Indian colonies to the Imperial government, which he was instrumental in helping to resolve.

Following his retirement, he settled in Bournemouth.

== Honours ==
- 1885 - Companion of the Order of the Bath (CB)
- 1893 - Knight Commander of the Order of the Star of India (KCSI)
- 1902 - Knight Grand Commander of the Order of the Indian Empire (GCIE)

== Family ==
Waterfield married first Catherine Jane Wood (1841-1882). Following her death, he married secondly, in 1885, Mary Augusta Shee, daughter of Edward Obré Shee. There were at least two sons; Richard Waterfield (1875-1959) and Lieutenant Horace Clare Waterfield (d.1918)
