= Martin Andrew Dillon =

General Sir Martin Andrew Dillon GCB CSI (19 June 1826 – 1913) was an Irish senior officer in the British Army.

== Biography ==
Dillon was the son of Major Andrew Dillon and entered the British Army in 1843.

He was present as a captain at the Siege of Lucknow during the Indian Mutiny of 1857 and as a major in the subsequent Oudh campaign of 1858. In the China Campaign of 1860 he served as an assistant adjutant-general on the staff of Major-General Sir Robert Napier and as the latter's military secretary in India and Abyssinia. He was Aide-de-Camp to Queen Victoria from 1868 to 1878 when, now promoted Major-general, he was appointed assistant military secretary to Prince George, Duke of Cambridge.

He was knighted as a Knight Commander of the Order of the Bath (KCB) in 1887. Promoted lieutenant-general in 1887 and full general on 16 July 1892, he was given the colonelcy of The Prince of Wales's Own (West Yorkshire Regiment) in 1897, transferring in 1913 to be briefly colonel-commandant of the 1st Battalion of the Rifle Brigade.

Dillon was appointed a Knight Grand Cross of the Order of the Bath (GCB) in the 1902 Coronation Honours list published on 26 June 1902, and was invested by King Edward VII at Buckingham Palace on 8 August 1902.

Military offices
Preceded by Alfred Thomas Heyland	Colonel of The Prince of Wales's Own (West Yorkshire Regiment); 1897–1904	Succeeded by William Hanbury Hawley
Preceded by Frederick Robert Elrington	Colonel-Commandant, 4th Battalion, Rifle Brigade; 1904–1905	Succeeded by Sir Godfrey Clerke
Preceded by Sir Julius Richard Glyn	Colonel-Commandant, 2nd Battalion, Rifle Brigade; 1905–1913	Succeeded by Sir Francis Howard
Preceded by Sir Arthur Frederick Warren	Colonel-Commandant, 1st Battalion, Rifle Brigade; 1913	Succeeded by Sir Christopher Rice Havard Nicholl
