= Executive Order 11110 =

1963 US executive order by President John F. Kennedy

Executive Order 11110 was issued by U.S. President John F. Kennedy on June 4, 1963.

This executive order amended Executive Order 10289 (dated September 17, 1951) by delegating to the Secretary of the Treasury the president's authority to issue silver certificates under the Thomas Amendment of the Agricultural Adjustment Act, as amended by the Gold Reserve Act. The order allowed the Secretary to issue silver certificates, if any were needed, during the transition period under President Kennedy's plan to eliminate Silver Certificates and use Federal Reserve Notes.

== Background ==
On November 28, 1961, President Kennedy halted sales of silver by the Treasury Department. Increasing demand for silver as an industrial metal had led to an increase in the market price of silver above the United States government's fixed price. This led to a decline in the government's excess silver reserves by over 80% during 1961. Kennedy also called upon Congress to phase out silver certificates in favor of Federal Reserve notes which, according to the Associated Press at that time, were still backed by gold.

Kennedy repeated his calls for Congress to act on several occasions, including his 1963 Economic Report, where he wrote:

I again urge a revision in our silver policy to reflect the status of silver as a metal for which there is an expanding industrial demand. Except for its use in coins, silver serves no useful monetary function. In 1961, at my direction, sales of silver were suspended by the Secretary of the Treasury. As further steps, I recommend repeal of those Acts that oblige the Treasury to support the price of silver; and repeal of the special 50-percent tax on transfers of interest in silver and authorization for the Federal Reserve System to issue notes in denominations of $1, so as to make possible the gradual withdrawal of silver certificates from circulation and the use of the silver thus released for coinage purposes. I urge the Congress to take prompt action on these recommended changes.

== Public Law 88-36 ==
The House of Representatives took up the president's request early in 1963, and passed HR 5389 on April 10, 1963, by a vote of 251 to 122. The Senate passed the bill on May 23, by a vote of 68 to 10.

Kennedy signed the bill into law on June 4, 1963, and on the same day signed an executive order (11110) authorizing the Treasury Secretary to continue printing silver certificates during the transition period. The act, which became Public Law 88-36 (77 Stat. 54), repealed the Silver Purchase Act of 1934 and related laws, repealed a tax on silver transfers, and authorized the Federal Reserve to issue one- and two-dollar bills, in addition to the notes they were already issuing. The Silver Purchase Act had authorized and required the Secretary of the Treasury to buy silver and issue silver certificates. With its repeal, the President needed to delegate to the Treasury Secretary the President's own authority under the Agricultural Adjustment Act.

== Text of Executive Order ==
President Kennedy's Executive Order (E.O.) 11110 modified the pre-existing Executive Order 10289 issued by U.S. President Harry S. Truman on September 17, 1951, and stated the following:

The Secretary of the Treasury is hereby designated and empowered to perform the following-described functions of the President without the approval, ratification, or other action of the President...

E.O. 10289 then lists tasks (a) through (h) which the Secretary may now do without instruction from the President. None of the powers assigned to the Treasury in E.O. 10289 relate to money or to monetary policy.

President Kennedy's E.O. 11110, in its entirety, follows:

SECTION 1. Executive Order No. 10289 of September 19 [sic], 1951, as amended, is hereby further amended --

(a) By adding at the end of paragraph 1 thereof the following subparagraph (j):

"(j) The authority vested in the President by paragraph (b) of section 43 of the Act of May 12, 1933, as amended (31 U.S.C. 821 (b)), to issue silver certificates against any silver bullion, silver, or standard silver dollars in the Treasury not then held for redemption of any outstanding silver certificates, to prescribe the denominations of such silver certificates, and to coin standard silver dollars and subsidiary silver currency for their redemption," and

(b) By revoking subparagraphs (b) and (c) of paragraph 2 thereof.

SEC. 2. The amendment made by this Order shall not affect any act done, or any right accruing or accrued or any suit or proceeding had or commenced in any civil or criminal cause prior to the date of this Order but all such liabilities shall continue and may be enforced as if said amendments had not been made.

JOHN F. KENNEDY
THE WHITE HOUSE,
June 4, 1963

== Revocation ==
In March 1964, Secretary of the Treasury C. Douglas Dillon halted redemption of silver certificates for silver dollars as Kennedy had intended. As of March 25, 1964, silver certificates would be redeemed in silver bullion only.

On June 24, 1968, all redemption in silver ceased.

In the 1970s, large numbers of the remaining silver dollars in the mint vaults were sold to the collecting public for collector value.

In 1982, Congress repealed the remaining legislative authority behind E.O. 11110 with the passage of Pub. L. 97–258.

On September 9, 1987, as part of a general clean-up of executive orders, President Ronald Reagan issued Executive Order 12608, which removed the text which had been added to E.O. 10289 by E.O. 11110. Specifically, E.O. 12608 revoked subparagraph (j) of paragraph 1 of E.O. 10289, as amended by E.O. 11110.

Although E.O. 12608 explicitly revoked the relevant portion of E.O. 10289 which had been added by E.O. 11110, thereby effectively revoking E.O. 11110 as such, the original legislative authority underpinning the order had, of course, already been nullified five years earlier, in 1982, by Congress, with the passage of Pub. L. 97–258.

== JFK assassination theory ==
Jim Marrs, in his book Crossfire, presented the theory that Kennedy was trying to rein in the power of the Federal Reserve, and that forces opposed to such action might have played some part in Kennedy's assassination. Marrs alleges that the issuance of Executive Order 11110 was an effort by Kennedy to transfer power from the Federal Reserve to the United States Department of the Treasury by replacing Federal Reserve Notes with silver certificates. Author Richard Belzer named the responsible parties in this theory as American "billionaires, power brokers, and bankers ... working in tandem with the CIA and other sympathetic agents of the government."

Critics of the theory note that Executive Order 11110 was a technicality that only delegated existing presidential powers to the Secretary of the Treasury for administrative convenience during a period of transition.

== See also ==
- Bimetallism
- Executive Order 6102
- History of the United States dollar
- Silver standard
- United States Note
