= Indian Currency Committee =

Government committee of British India

The Indian Currency Committee or Fowler Committee was a government committee appointed by the British-run Government of India on 29 April 1898 to examine the currency situation in India. Until 1892, silver was the metal on which Indian currency and coinage had largely been based. In 1892, the Government of India announced its intent to "close Indian mints to silver" and, in 1893, it brought this policy into force. The committee recommended that the official Indian rupee be based on the gold standard and the official exchange rate of the rupee be established at 15 rupees per British sovereign, or 1 shilling and 4 pence per rupee. The British Imperial Government accepted the recommendations of the commission in July 1899.

The action of the government in abandoning silver coinage was driven by the relative decline of the value of silver against gold, which had led to an accompanying decline of the rupee against gold and gold-based currencies (such as the British sovereign). India had been importing about a quarter of the annual global production of silver, in part to meet its currency issuing requirements. Some commentators noted that silver was gradually being globally discarded as a basis of currency, with only three main remaining supporters: Mexico (a major producer of silver), the United States, and India. With India's move to the gold standard, the silver standard lost a significant supporter.

== Miscellaneous ==
The committee was chaired by Sir Henry Fowler (later Viscount Fowler), and was often referred to as the Fowler Committee. Its final recommendation was also referred to as the Fowler Report.
