= Edward Raban (British Army officer) =

British Army officer (1850–1927)

Brigadier-General Sir Edward Raban KCB KBE
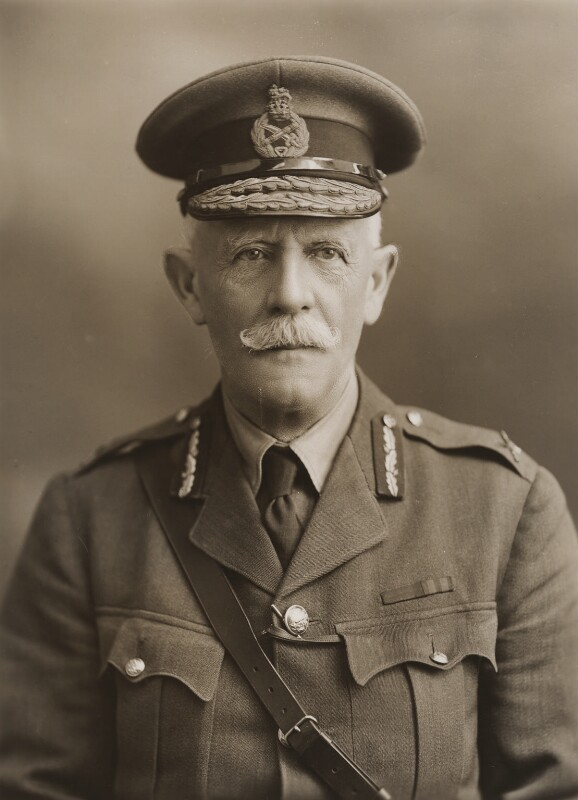
- Raban in 1917
- Born: 8 August 1850
- Died: 8 February 1927 (aged 76)

Brigadier-General Sir Edward Raban, KCB, KBE (8 August 1850 – 8 February 1927) was a British Army officer in the Royal Engineers.
