= William John Archer =

British diplomat and colonial judge (1861-1934)

William John Archer CMG
- Born: 2 April 1861
- Died: 10 December 1934 (aged 73); Somerset West, Cape Colony
- Occupation(s): Diplomat and colonial judge
- Children: 2 sons and 5 daughters

William John Archer CMG (2 April 1861 – 10 December 1934) was a British colonial judge and diplomat in Siam (today Thailand) in the nineteenth century.

== Early life and education ==
Archer was born on 2 April 1861, and was the son of William Archer, Assistant Commissary-General. He was educated at Laussane, Switzerland, and called to the Bar of the Middle Temple.

== Career ==
In 1882, Archer joined the Colonial Service and was sent to Siam as a student interpreter. In 1886, he was appointed acting British Vice-Consul at Chiang Mai, and two years later was promoted to Consul at Chiang Mai, and remained in the post until 1891.

He was employed on the first team of the Burma-Siam Boundary Commission to demarcate boundaries in the borderlands of Siam, Burma and Yunnan (1888-1891). In 1888, he was sent by the Chief Commissioner of Burma to investigate and demarcate the boundaries of Kengtung, Shan States, but was met there with indifference and rejection, and his efforts to enforce submission to Britain failed.

In 1896, he was appointed consul at Bangkok, and served as head of the Legation at various times. In 1901, he wrote to Marquess of Lansdowne of his proposal to erect a statue to the late Queen Victoria. Funds were raised from Chinese-British donors and unveiled in the Legation grounds in 1903.

In 1903, he was appointed as the first judge of the British Court of Siam. In 1904, he went to Egypt where he served as Judge of the Mixed Tribunals in Alexandria for the Egyptian Government (1904-1906). On his return, he was appointed Councillor of the Siamese Legation in London, and remained in the position from 1906 to 1926. In 1926, he retired to South Africa.

== Personal life and death ==
Archer married Christina Burrow in 1892, and they had two sons and five daughters. He died at Somerset West, Cape Colony, South Africa on 10 December 1934, aged 73.

== Honours ==
Archer was appointed Companion of the Order of St Michael and St George (CMG) in the 1902 Coronation Honours. He was decorated Knight Commander of the Order of the Crown of Siam.
