= Robert Boak =

Sir Robert Boak (died 6 December 1904) was president of the Legislative Council of the Province of Nova Scotia. He was knighted in 1902.
