= William Andrew Archer =

American economic botanist and plant collector (1894–1973)

- Born: November 7, 1894; Torreon, Coahuila, Mexico
- Died: May 7, 1973 (aged 78); Washington, D.C., United States of America
- Education: University of Michigan
- Known for: Extensive plant exploration, collecting, taxonomy, research, documentation, publications, including the study of mycology, phytopathology and also, the medicinal uses of plants
- Scientific career
- Fields: Botany
- Workplaces: United States National Arboretum
- Author abbrev. (botany): W.A.Archer

William Andrew Archer (1894–1973) was an American economic botanist, ethnobotanist, taxonomist, plant explorer, and herbarium curator. He was born in Torreon, Mexico to American parents. Archer studied at New Mexico State College, earning his B.S. in biology, and completed a Ph.D. in botany and mycology at the University of Michigan in 1925. Most of his professional career was spent at United States Department of Agriculture (USDA), including his position as Curator of the United States National Arboretum Herbarium from 1938 to 1964. After his retirement from the USDA, Archer was appointed Research Associate in the Department of Botany, National Museum of Natural History (NMNH). His career was marked by extensive collecting trips to Central and South America and to Africa. He spoke English, Portuguese and Spanish.

Hıs ashes were scattered in a woodland area in Prince George's County, Maryland.

== Biography ==
Before attending school he served in the New Mexico Infantry from 1916 to 1917 and during World War I at the AEF BASE Hospital in France. His mother helped him financially during his first two years of college with money that she earned raising cattle and chickens in New Mexico. His academic interests focused on botany, mycology, plant pathology, bacteriology, physical chemistry, entomology, ornithology, genetics, and English composition. He was unemployed during the Great Depression, eventually finding a position at a brewery in Foggy Bottom before starting his career as an employee of the United States government.

Donovan S. Correll has written that:

"He was never so happy as when he and others who were fortunate enough to be invited to do so would sit down to enjoy a bowl of his muy picante chili while sharing a slightly or not so slightly risque story. The gallon pot that geysered on the electric unit in the Herbarium quarters at Beltsville, Maryland, before its removal to the National Arboretum, reeked the entire building's atmosphere with its searing contents."

== Career ==
At the USDA he worked in Beltsville, Maryland at the Division of Plant Exploration and Introduction as a Botanist. He was stationed in Belém at the Brazilian Research Institute in the Office of Foreign Agriculture relations, and served as a plant taxonomist and herbarium curator at the United States National Arboretum. Working in the public sector, he felt encumbered by bureaucratic regulations. When he was in his fifties his wife died of an inoperable brain tumor not even one year into their marriage in 1948. When he retired from public service after 31 years, he took a position with the Smithsonian Institution doing archival work in the herbarium.

As part of his work he contributed to the development of a Flora of Nevada. He helped establish a botanical laboratory, garden and herbarium in Medellín, Colombia. He explored Latin America in search of insecticidal plants, varieties of wild and cultivated peanut, tobacco, vegetables and ornamentals. He visited Ethiopia to collect seeds for cereals, forage plants and vegetables.
