= Johan Wilhelm Colenbrander =

Soldier and official in Southern Africa

- An 1893 drawing of Colenbrander
- Born: 1 November 1855; Pinetown, Colony of Natal
- Died: 10 February 1918 (aged 62); Klip River, Transvaal, Union of South Africa
- Occupations: soldier and colonial officer
- Children: 2
- Awards: Companion of the Order of the Bath

Johan Wilhelm Colenbrander CB (1 November 1855 – 10 February 1918) was a Natal-born soldier and colonial official in Southern Africa. Colenbrander served with the Natal Mounted Police and the Stanger Mounted Rifles, seeing action in the 1879 Anglo-Zulu War. During the war Colenbrander negotiated the surrender of Zulu Inkosi (chief) Zibhebhu kaMaphitha and afterwards worked for him as a secretary and gunrunner. He fought for Zibhebhu during the 1883–1884 Third Zulu Civil War but lost all his trade goods and cattle when Zibhebhu was defeated.

Colenbrander worked as a trader in Swaziland for a period before moving to Mashonaland by 1889, where he worked closely with the British South Africa Company (BSAC). He won the trust of Ndebele King Lobengula but worked against him to set up the 1893–1894 First Matabele War, to the benefit of BSAC. After the war he was appointed head of a land commission that confined the Ndebele to a reserve of land much smaller than their pre-war territory. Colenbrander led a mercenary unit fighting for BSAC in the subsequent 1896 Second Matabele War. He raised another unit which served under British command in the 1899–1902 Second Boer War with Colenbrander leading a column against the Boer Commando of Christiaan Frederik Beyers. Colenbrander died in 1918 during filming of a movie about the Zulu War.

== Early life ==
The National Archives of Rhodesia and a publication by the University of Natal give Colenbrander's birth date as 1 November 1855, though other sources give the year as 1856 or 1857. He was born in Pinetown in the British Colony of Natal, the fourth son of Dutch-born parents Theodorus Christiaan Colenbrander and Geraldine Nicolene van Groll. Colenbrander's parents had emigrated from Java in the Dutch East Indies to Natal in 1854 after their indigo plantation had failed. They established an indigo plantation at Pine Town and in 1857 established another and a coffee plantation near Unhlali, which grew into the settlement of New Guelderland. Colenbrander grew up in New Guelderland, looked after by a Zulu nurse from whom he became fluent in the Zulu language. In his youth became recognised as one of the best marksmen and horsemen in Southern Africa.

== Zululand ==
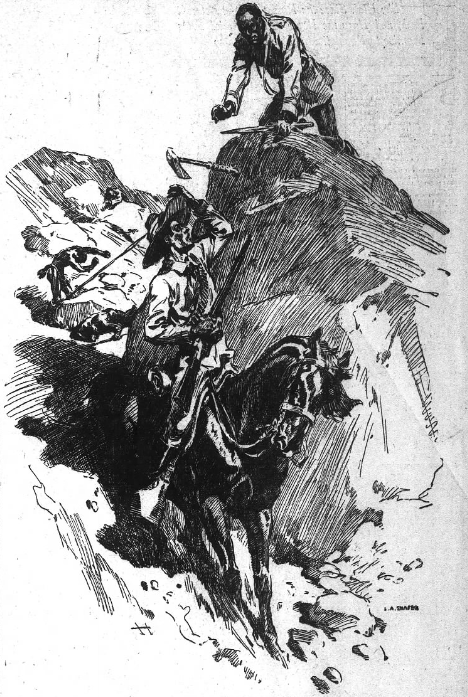
A depiction of the 1879 encounter

Colenbrander joined the Natal Mounted Police, an all-white militarised colonial police force, in 1870. When the Stanger Mounted Rifles, a colonial volunteer military unit, was founded in 1875 he transferred to that unit. During the 1879 Anglo-Zulu War he saw action at the 22 January Battle of Inyezane and the 2 April Battle of Gingindlovu. At the latter battle he met John Robert Dunn, a British settler in Zululand who had been made a chief by Cetshwayo, the king of the Zulu.

Colenbrander became Dunn's secretary in the later stages of the war and negotiated the surrender of Zulu Inkosi (chief) Zibhebhu kaMaphitha. Colenbrander won Zibhebhu's trust and stayed on with him in Zululand as a secretary, trader and gunrunner. In 1911 he recounted to a Washington Post correspondent an account of his service for Zibhebhu in defeating a raid from a neighbouring Zulu chief in 1879. Colenbrander said that he led a force of 17 mounted Zulu, that he had personally trained, against a force of 300 warriors. He stated that he killed 17 Zulu that day and while alone riding down the survivors was attacked by a single warrior. He was struck on the head by a war axe and, falling from his horse, broke his rifle. Colenbrander said he suffered another wound to his hands in warding of an assegai thrust and was struck three or four times again on the head, leaving the weapon embedded in his skull. He then struck the Zulu with the spur on his boot, bringing him to the ground, and releasing the assegai which he used to stab the warrior. Colenbrander then tried to mount his horse when the Zulu, who had survived, leapt to his feat and struck Colenbrander on the back of the head as he dived from the horse. Grappling together on the ground Colenbrander said he was able to use the bent assegai blade to kill the Zulu. He treated the wounds with disinfectant from his store and said that eight days later was in action again against another raid. The encounter left him with a 7-inch (180 mm) long scar down his left temple and cheek. Colenbrander relayed a similar account to a young Bertram Mitford in early 1882 while travelling with the future British Army general in Zululand. Colenbrander took Mitford to meet Dunn and showed him the battlefield of Gingindlovu and a number of abandoned British forts. Mitford wrote about his experiences in the 1883 book Through the Zulu Country.

With Dunn in July 1882 he helped quell a rebellion by Sitimela. Sitimela claimed to be a grandson of Dingiswayo and intended to re-establish the Mthethwa Paramountcy in Zulu territory. A contemporary report in the London Daily News claimed Colenbrander took pleasure in shooting down Sitimela's supporters, including a number of women, and that he was unfit to play a part in the governance of Zululand. In 1883 Colenbrander married Maria "Mollie" Mullins of Verulam. Mullins was a capable horserider, an accurate shot with a rifle and fluent in Zulu; she accompanied Colenbrander on many of his frontier expeditions.

During the 1883–1884 Third Zulu Civil War Colenbrander fought for Zibhebhu at the head of a party of white mercenaries and helped defeat the supporters of Cetshwayo at the 1883 Battle of Msebe. Colenbrander returned to Natal to recruit more men, but while he was absent, Zibhebhu was defeated in the 1884 Battle of Tshaneni (Mkuze), by the forces of Cetshwayo's son Dinuzulu. As a result of the defeat Colenbrander lost all his cattle and trade goods.

== Rhodesia ==
Colenbrander then worked for a period as a trader in Swaziland before moving to Mashonaland upon which the British South Africa Company (BSAC) had territorial ambitions (the BSAC territory later became known as Rhodesia). Mashonaland was ruled, along with Matabeleland by Lobengula of the Northern Ndebele people. Colenbrander worked with Lobengula as an interpreter and accompanied two of his inDuna (lesser chiefs) to England in February 1889 for an audience with Queen Victoria. They left to return to Africa in early April. Colenbrander was appointed BSAC resident at Bulawayo, Matabeleland in 1889. He accompanied the Pioneer Column that annexed Mashonaland for the BSAC in 1890 and, after a brief stint in Cape Town, returned to Matabeleland with Mollie.

A depiction of Colenbrander with BSAC volunteers during the First Matabele War

Although he was an employee of the BSAC, Colenbrander won the trust of Lobengula, such that the King allowed him to represent the kingdom in negotiations with the company. Colenbrander's loyalty lay entirely with the company and he worked to assist Leander Starr Jameson in portraying the Ndebele as aggressors in reports to British officials, giving the company cause to start the First Matabele War. The company was victorious in the 1893–1894 war, during which Colenbrander served as a scout for military expeditions, alongside Frederick Russell Burnham. The war brought Matebeleland under full BSAC control. The British authorities insisted on the establishment of a Matabeleland Land Commission to create native reserves for the Ndebele people and Colenbrander was appointed its head. BSAC policy was to force the Ndebele away from their traditional self-sufficient lifestyle and into wage slavery. The allocation of land was made in support of this goal and a hut tax, illegal under British colonial law, was also imposed. Colenbrander assigned the Ndebele a reserve of 6,500 square miles (17,000 km^{2}), significantly smaller than the 10,000–11,000 square miles (26,000–28,000 km^{2}) of prime territory (with additional areas of wasteland) the Ndebele had previously occupied. Some of the land assigned by the commission was blighted by the Tsetse fly.

Colenbrander occasionally commanded British South Africa Police patrols, including an early 1894 expedition to suppress a rebellion in the Matopo Hills. During one police expedition he had a horse shot from under him. In July 1894 he and Mollie entertained Scottish naturalist Alice Blanche Balfour at Bulawayo. Colenbrander took a six-month leave of absence in 1895 which included a visit to England where he was a guest of the Anglo-African Writers Club. He also established, in London, Colenbrander's Matabeleland Development Company, as a limited company. This venture controlled several valuable concessions in Matabeleland, including 53,000 acres (21,000 ha) of land and 930 gold mining claims. It had an initial market capitalisation of £280,000 (equivalent to £31,831,548 in 2025). The company was sold to Frank Johnson's Rhodesia Consolidated in 1903.

Dissatisfied with their reserve and the hut tax the Ndebele rose against BSAC in the 1896 Second Matabele War, during which Colenbrander was granted the rank of captain in the Bulawayo Field Force. He raised and led a Coloured mercenary unit, known as the Cape Boys, and, with Cecil Rhodes, helped negotiate the surrender of the Ndebele chiefs. After the war Colenbrander remained in the territory, working as a cattle dealer, labour recruiter, mining claims inspector and manager of Redrup's Kop Mine.

== Second Boer War ==
During the Second Boer War (1899–1902) Colenbrander founded and led Kitchener's Fighting Scouts, a unit fighting for the British. He later commanded a British column. On 9 July 1901 Colenbrander, who then held the rank of lieutenant-colonel, received the first of numerous mentions in dispatches, being named by General Herbert Kitchener for bringing in Boer prisoners during a raid from Pietersburg in early May. Colenbrander commanded troops that occupied the Boer settlement of Louis Trichardt on 9 May and on 19 November captured Warmbaths taking 54 prisoners, 28 wagons and 35 horses, mainly from the commando of Christian Frederick Beyers. He remained at Warmbaths to keep the Boer military forces in the area under observation.

By December 1901 he held the rank of colonel. That month, working in conjunction with a column under Lieutenant-Colonel Dawkins he captured Boer Commandant Adriaan Dirk Badenhorst and 22 burghers. Colenbrander, working independently, then took the towns of Jericho, capturing 60 prisoners, and Waterval, killing 5 Boers and taking 29 prisoners in a surprise dawn attack. After the latter he persuaded Chief Linchwe I of the Kgatla people to stand down a war party of 2,000 warriors who were attempting to recapture livestock taken by Boer General Jan Kemp. Colenbrander was concerned that Linchwe's men posed a threat to Boer women and children. In February 1902 Colenbrander's column was ordered south, which allowed Beyers to raid Pietersburg. Afterwards Colenbrander was ordered to Rustenburg to search for Beyers. Beyers besieged Fort Edward near Louis Trichardt and it was almost forced to surrender, its water supply being cut off. Colenbrander learnt of the attack and moved from Krugersdorp to launch a surprise dawn attack on the besiegers on 29 March, driving them off with three dead and four taken prisoner. Colenbrander afterwards followed Beyers to Pylkop.

On 8 April he launched a successful attack on Beyers' position at Malipspoort. Although a planned encirclement failed to prevent the escape of the Boer force Colenbrander captured the town, much equipment and 119 prisoners, having inflicted nine dead. In pursuing Beyers to Oud Agatha, part of Colenbrander's force was ambushed and it lost six dead, 12 wounded and 30 captured. After this Beyers' force dispersed and Colenbrander returned to Pietersburg. In May 1902 Colenbrander carried out operations in the Malip Valley, killing one Boer, wounding 21 and capturing 101 before Beyers' arrival for peace negotiations ended operations. Colenbrander was appointed a Companion of the Order of the Bath on 26 June 1902 for his war service. After the war's end Colenbrander agreed to purchase from the British Army around 11,000 surplus horses, for a total in excess of £80,000 (equivalent to £8,501,594 in 2025). Three thousand of the horses died and Colenbrander was unable to pay £30,000 (equivalent to £3,188,098 in 2025) of the contracted price and was forced to declare bankruptcy.

== Later life ==
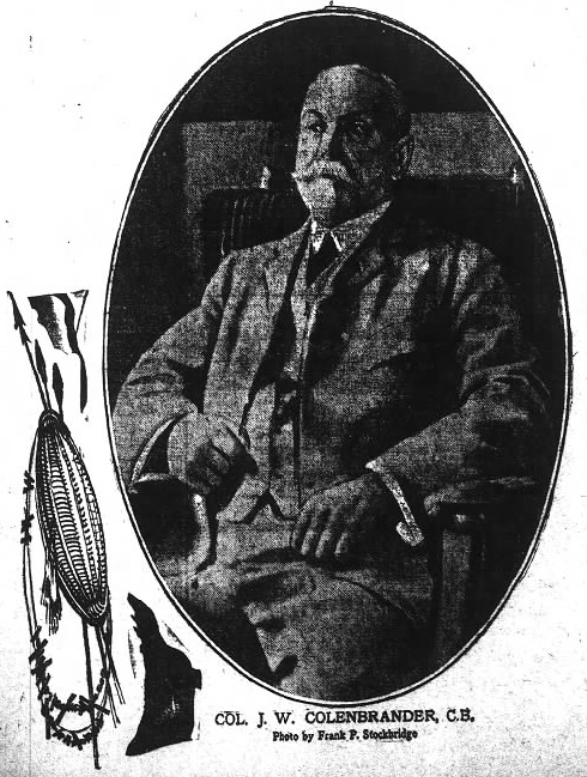
A 1911 photograph of Colenbrander

Colenbrander's first wife died in 1900 and he married Yvonne Nunn in 1902. He had one daughter, Geraldine, before Nunn died in 1904. Colenbrander lived with Geraldine in Boston, United States, from 1909. He was employed by the Middlebury-Vermont Marble Company, with contemporary reports describing him as having "considerable experience in England as a quarry owner".

Colenbrander returned to England in April 1911 penniless, his passage provided for by the British consulate in New York. Ten days after arriving in England he was arrested on fraud charges relating to $1,250 (equivalent to $43,192 in 2025) he had accepted as payment for a shooting expedition in central Africa. The complainant, Aylmer Francis Richard Dunlop Quin, alleged that he had made the payment on the basis that he was promised valuable mineral and land concessions would result from the expedition. Colenbrander presented evidence, including letters to Robert Baden-Powell, that the expedition was of a purely sporting nature. The charge was dismissed at Bow Street Magistrates' Court on 10 May 1911 after the magistrate decided that on the basis on evidence heard no jury would convict Colenbrander. Colenbrander married Catherine Gloster in 1911, with whom he had a son, John; Catherine died in 1982. After the court case Colenbrander returned to South Africa, funded by BSAC, but enjoyed little financial success.

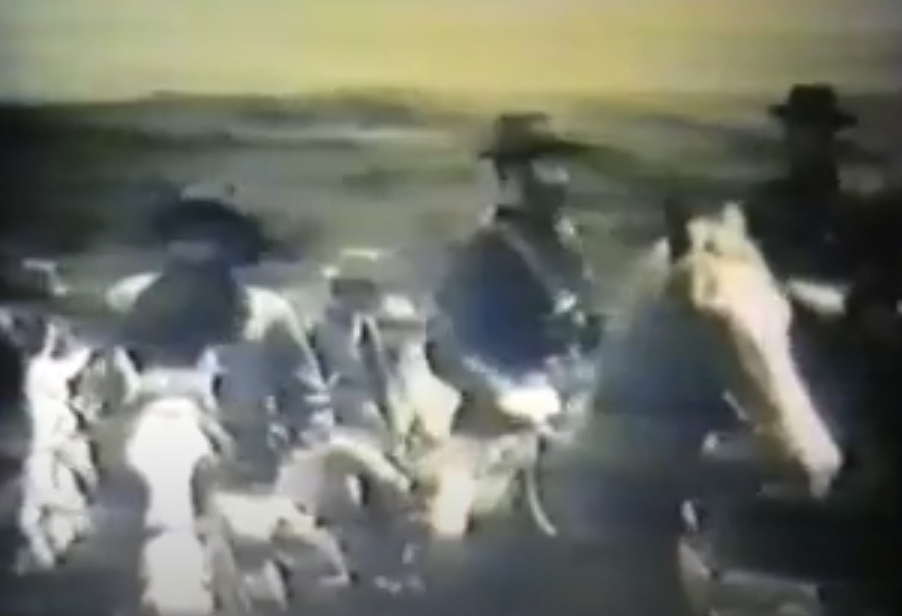
Colenbrander as Lord Chelmsford in Symbol of Sacrifice, shortly before his death

In 1918 Colenbrander worked on the filming of Symbol of Sacrifice, about the Anglo-Zulu War. He served as a historical advisor and as an actor, portraying the British commander Lord Chelmsford. One scene depicted the British force crossing the Tugela River at the start of the campaign. The Klip River stood in for the Tugela in a scene filmed at Henley on Klip, Transvaal. The river was in flood when the scene was shot on 10 February and the film's producer, I. W. Schlesinger tried to dissuade Colenbrander from attempting the crossing. Colenbrander insisted on continuing with the scene as written. His horse lost its footing and he was thrown into the river. He attempted to swim to the bank but was drowned, alongside two other actors, in a sequence caught on camera. Colenbrander's body was not recovered.

The drownings, which happened on a Sunday, were mentioned in a South African House of Assembly debate as part of an argument against filming taking place on the Christian Sabbath. The loss of Colenbrander seems to have led to Chelmsford being relegated to the role of a minor character in the final version of the film, which was released later that year.

Some of Colenbrander's papers and correspondence are in the collection of the Bodleian Library, the Yale Library, the National Archives of Zimbabwe and the Killie Campbell Library in Natal. Some physical artefacts belonging to Colenbrander are held by the South Mill Arts centre in Bishop's Stortford, England. John Colenbrander gathered material on his father which was used for a biography begun by Frederick de Bertodano, 8th Marquis del Moral in the 1950s and completed by Tom V. Bulpin after the Marquis' death. It was published in 1961 under the title The White Whirlwind.
