= John Samuel Schlesinger =

South African businessman

- Born: 29 March 1923
- Died: 1994 (aged 70–71)
- Education: Michaelhouse, Harvard University
- Occupation: Businessman
- Known for: Expansion and modernization of the Schlesinger Organization
- Notable work: Large-scale real estate developments in South Africa
- Spouse(s): Ann Lee Iva Willens (1944), Rita Rose Pane (1966)
- Parent(s): I. W. Schlesinger and Mable May

John Samuel Schlesinger (29 March 1923 – 1994) was a South African businessman known for transforming and expanding the Schlesinger Organization, a major real estate and cinema-chain empire originally built by his father, Isidore W. Schlesinger.

== Early life and education ==
John Schlesinger was born into a prominent well-to-do Jewish South African-American family of Hungarian-Jewish origins, whilst his mother was English. He was schooled at Michaelhouse (many years later donating the Schlesinger Theatre) and then attended Harvard University, where he gained a reputation as a playboy known for his enthusiasm for speedboat racing and beauty pageants. During World War II he served as a U.S. Air Force bombardier, but renounced his U.S. citizenship in 1947.

== Career ==
=== The Schlesinger Organization ===
In 1949, following the death of his father in South Africa, Schlesinger assumed leadership of the Schlesinger Organization. Initially perceived as an unlikely successor, he soon proved skeptics wrong. Over his first 14 years at the helm, he not only preserved the empire but also expanded and modernized it.

Logo used as 20th Century Fox from 1986 to 2020.

Recognizing the need for focus, Schlesinger began by consolidating the organization's holdings. He sold the family's chain of bioscopes to 20th Century-Fox (now 20th Century Studios) for $28 million and divested the hotels, including the iconic original Carlton Hotel in Johannesburg, which he demolished in 1963 to make way for a new office building.

=== Land development ===
Schlesinger ventured into large-scale land development, committing $20 million to six high-rise projects across Johannesburg, Durban, Cape Town, and Port Elizabeth, with additional funding earmarked for future development.

=== Disinvestment from South Africa ===
Schlesinger was ahead of his time as a prominent businessman publicly criticizing the South African Government's policy of apartheid in the 1960s, advocating for a future multiracial South Africa. However, in 1974 he severed his connection with South Africa by selling his interest in the Schlesinger Organization and moving to Switzerland.

== Personal life ==
Schlesinger was a major collector and supporter of the arts and artists. When Vladimir Tretchikoff immigrated to South Africa in 1946, he was employed within the Schlesinger Organisation until he became a well-known and popular full-time artist. Schlesinger bought Tretchikoff's famous painting, Lost Orchid, from him in 1949 as a gift for his wife, but agreed to sell it back to him a few years later for on-sale to an American actor. Another South African artist that he supported early in his career was Italian-born sculptor, Edoardo Villa. In 1979 he donated a collection of well over 100 African art works to the Wits Art Museum.
