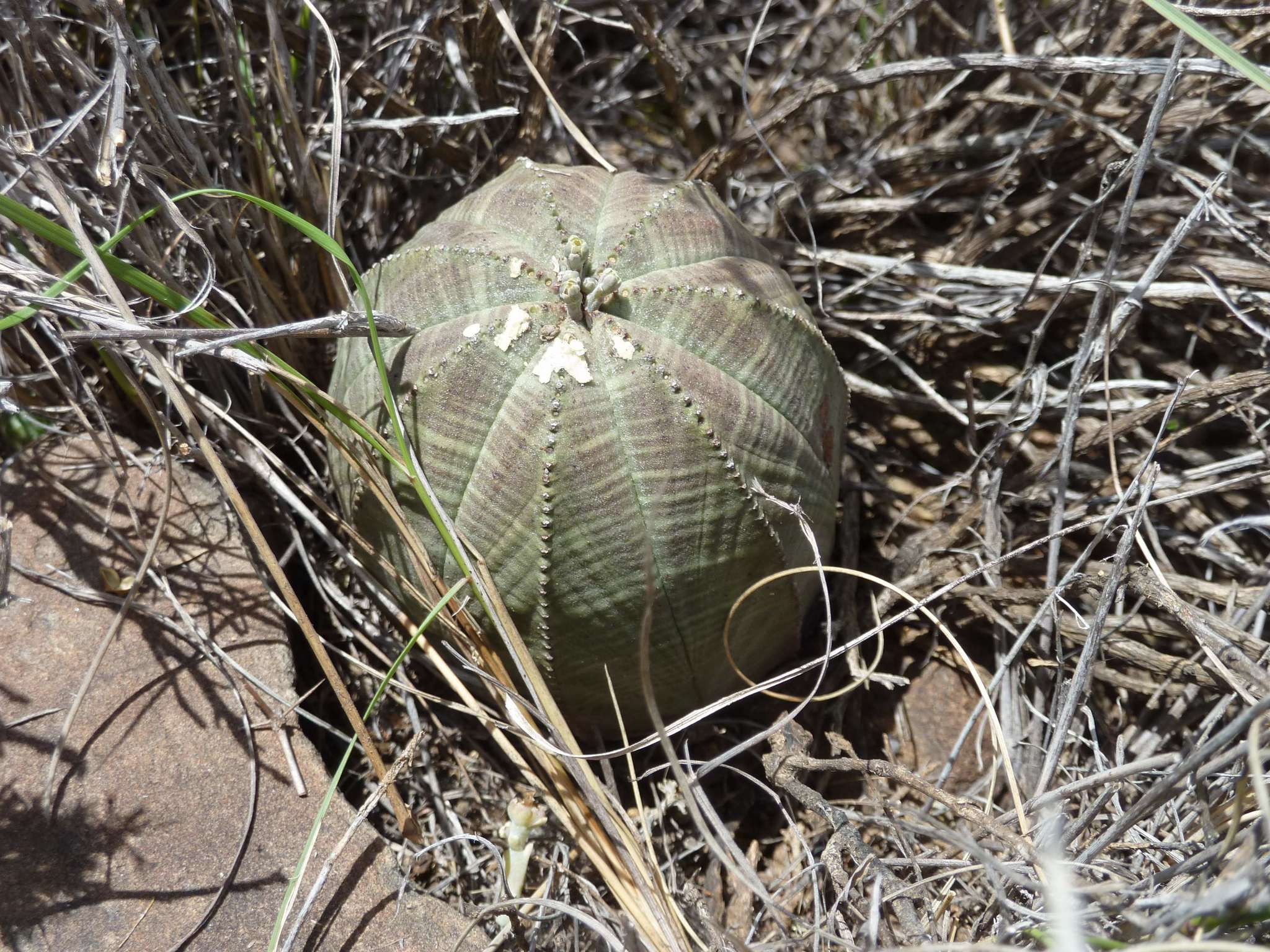
- Euphorbia obesa subsp. obesa, near Kendrew, Eastern Cape, South Africa
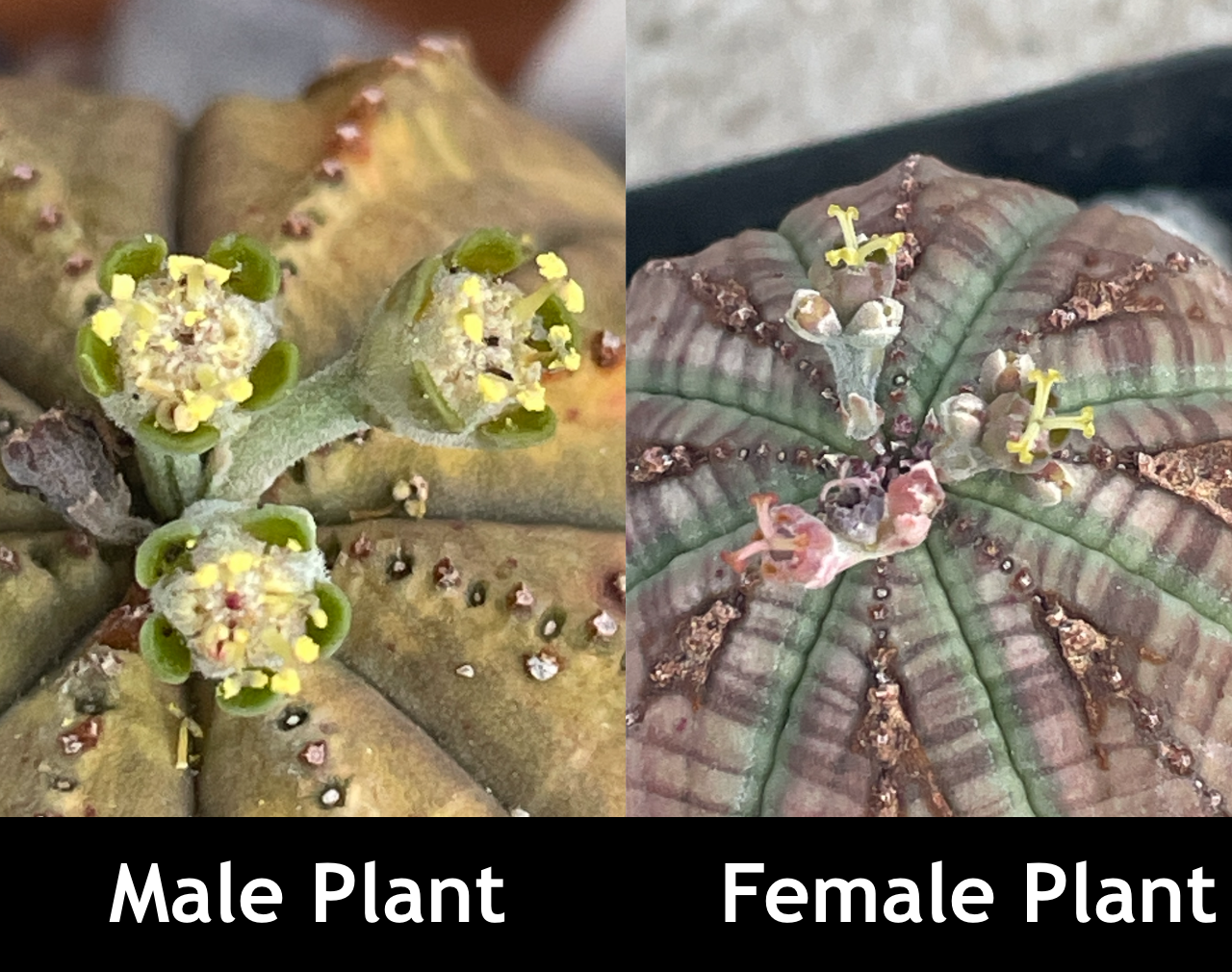
- View clearly showing the features of a male flower vs a female flower
- CITES Appendix II

Scientific classification
- Kingdom: Plantae
- Clade: Embryophytes
- Clade: Tracheophytes
- Clade: Spermatophytes
- Clade: Angiosperms
- Clade: Eudicots
- Clade: Rosids
- Order: Malpighiales
- Family: Euphorbiaceae
- Genus: Euphorbia
- Species: E. obesa

Binomial name
- Euphorbia obesa Hook.f.

= Euphorbia obesa =

Baseball plant

Species of succulent flowering plant

Euphorbia obesa is a subtropical succulent species of flowering plant in the genus Euphorbia. It comes from the arid Karoo in the Eastern Cape Province of South Africa. It is sometimes referred to as the baseball plant.

In the wild it is endangered because of over-collection and poaching, combined with its slow growth, and the fact that the pod contains only two or three seeds. However, it is widely cultivated in botanical gardens.

== Taxonomy ==
There are two subspecies:

- Euphorbia obesa subsp. obesa. Mature plants ovoid, taller than broad. Native to the region of Kendrew, around 100 km (62 mi) northeast of subsp. symmetrica.
- Euphorbia obesa subsp. symmetrica (A.C.White, R.A.Dyer & B.Sloane) G.D.Rowley (syn. E. symmetrica). Mature plants remaining globose, as wide as tall. Native to the region of Willowmore and Beaufort, where they were discovered in 1941.

== Description ==
Euphorbia obesa resembles a ball, thornless and decorative. It is commonly known as 'baseball plant' due to its shape. Its diameter is between 6 and 15 cm (2.4 and 5.9 in) depending on its age. Young plants are spherical, but they contain water reservoirs for periods of drought.

It almost always shows eight ridges adorned with small deep gibbosity regularly planted on the edges. It is grey-green with horizontal lighter or darker stripes. In the wild, and with exposure to direct sunlight, it shows red and purple areas.

The plant is dioecious, which means that a subject has only male or female flowers. The small flowers are insignificant in apex. In fact, like all Euphorbia, flowers are called cyathia.

As in most Euphorbia species, the latex is toxic.

Living in similar climatic conditions on two different continents, Euphorbia obesa demonstrates convergent evolution in shape with the unrelated Astrophytum asterias, a cactus from Mexico.

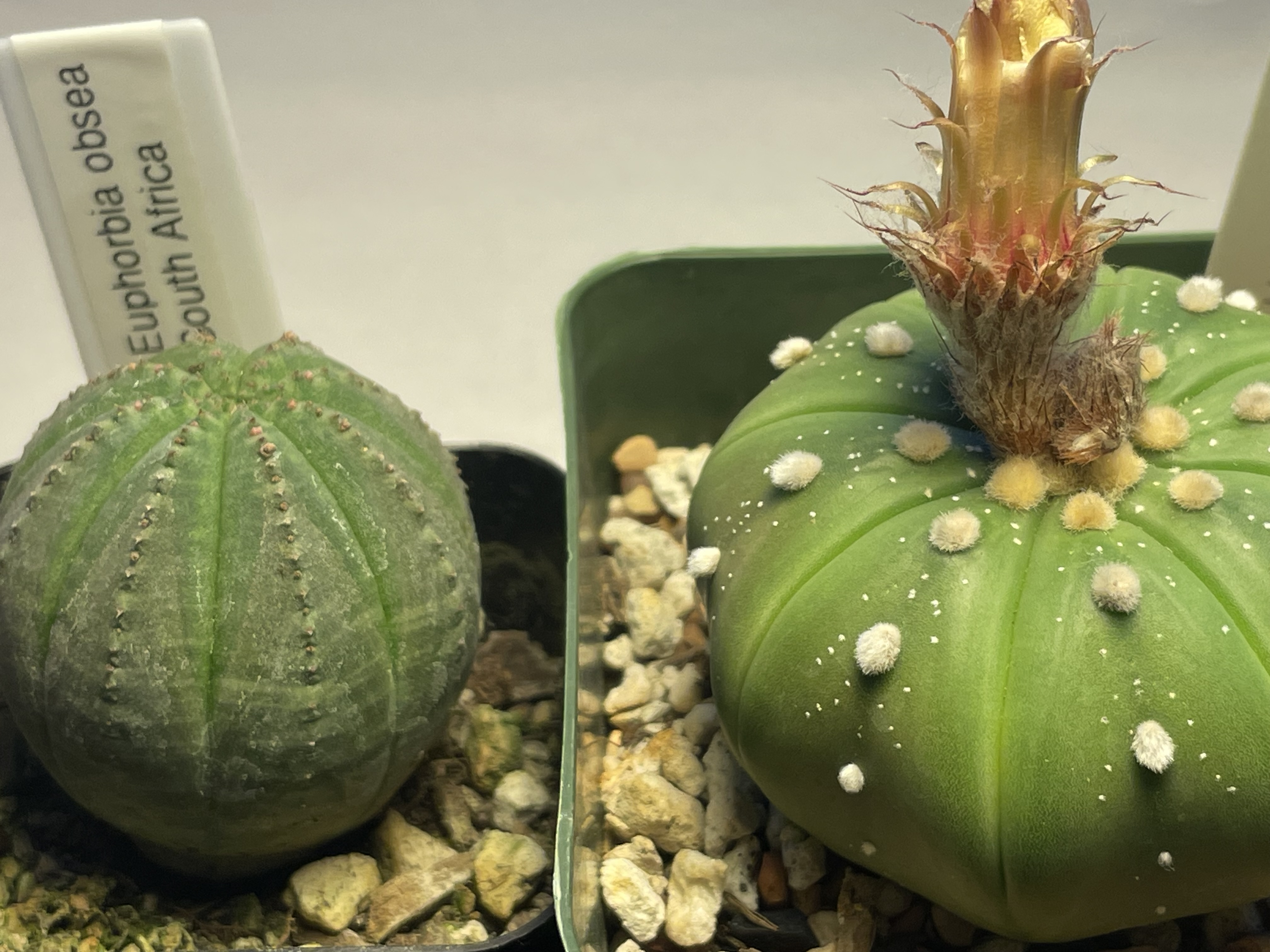
Montage showing the similarities between Euphorbia obesa (left) and Astrophytum asterias (right)

== Cultivation ==
In cultivation in the UK, Euphorbia obesa has won the Royal Horticultural Society's Award of Garden Merit.

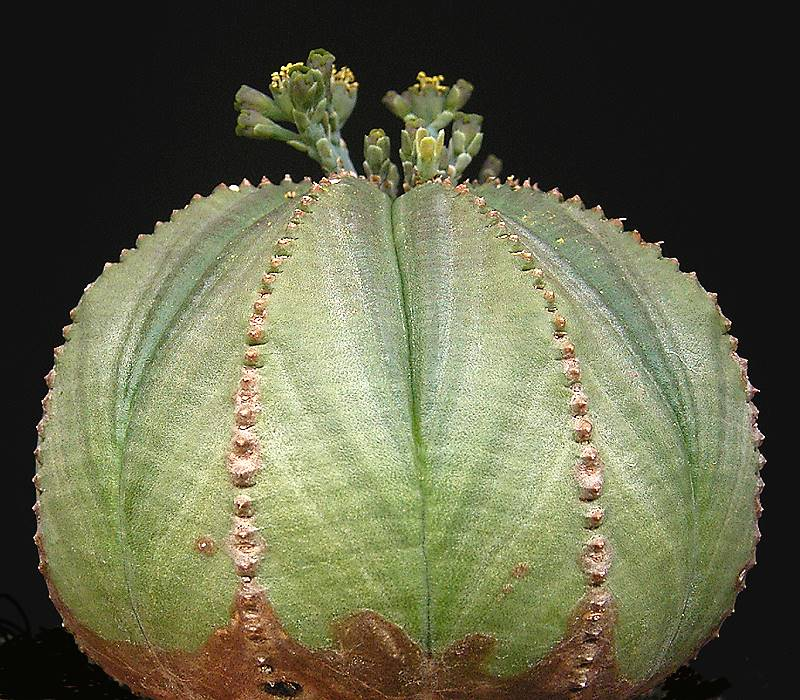
Male flowers

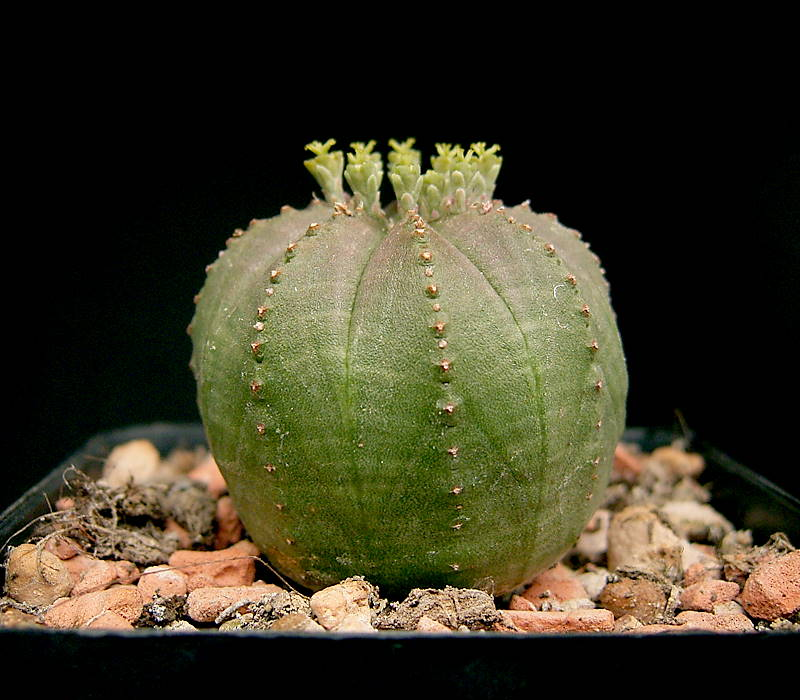
Female flowers

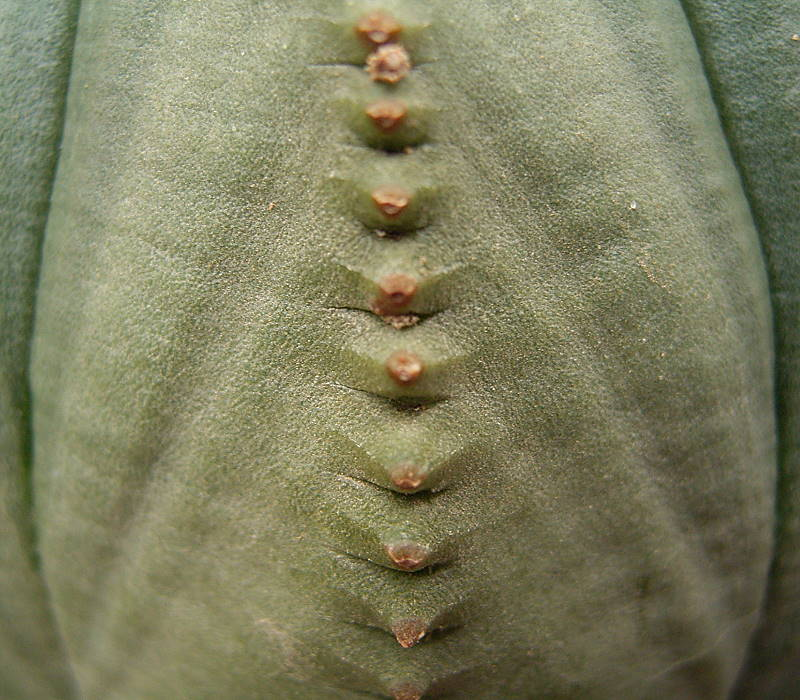
Close-up of ridge
