= Killarney, Johannesburg =

Killarney
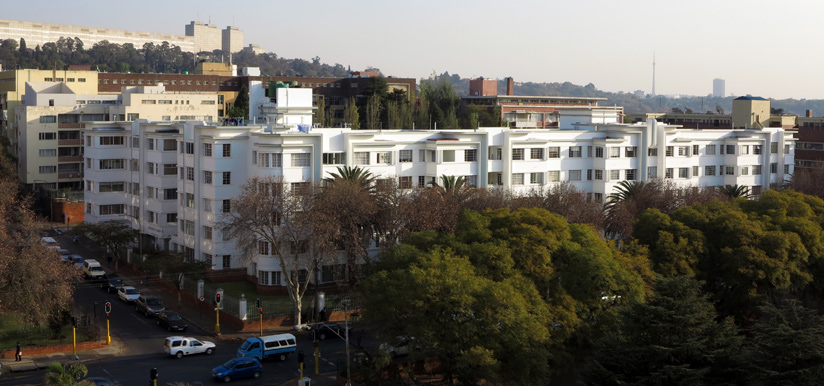
- Daventry Court, an Art Deco apartment building in Killarney

- Location within Gauteng Location within South Africa
- Coordinates: - 5300) 26°9′57″S 28°3′11″E
- Country: South Africa
- Province: Gauteng
- Municipality: City of Johannesburg
- Main Place: Johannesburg
- Established: 1907

Area
  - Total: 0.42 km^{2} (0.16 sq mi)

Population (2023)
  - Total: 5,000 - 5,300
  - Density: 12,000/km^{2} (31,000/sq mi)

Racial makeup (2023)
  - Black African: 32%
  - Coloured: 4%
  - Indian/Asian: 14%
  - White: 48%
  - Other: 2%
- Time zone: UTC+2 (SAST)
- Postal code (street): 2193

Killarney is a leafy suburb of Johannesburg in Gauteng. The suburb lies astride the M1 motorway.

Killarney is a predominantly residential, very wealthy area noted for its mix of Art Deco, post‑war, and 1960s–70s mid-rise apartment blocks. It was formerly known as the Hollywood of Johannesburg, due it being the location of one of the first film studios in South Africa. The suburb has historically been associated with its Jewish residents and founder, I. W. Schlesinger.

During the apartheid era, it was classed as a "whites only" area under the terms of the Group Areas Act. Since the repeal of the Act in 1991, the resident-mix has become more cosmopolitan, albeit with white residents remaining the largest population group.

== History ==
In the early 1930s, the land in Killarney, an outlying northern suburb, belonged to I. W. Schlesinger’s African Realty Trust. ‘The Uncrowned King of Africa’ had bought the 43-hectare for £120,000. American-born Schlesinger wanted to transplant American ways to South African soil, and particularly to his new home, Killarney. On the grounds currently occupied by the Killarney Mall, he built African Film Studios, Johannesburg’s answer to Hollywood.Schlesinger, the initial developer, was always open about his Jewish identity. He set up several facilities in Killarney that welcomed his co-religionists: the Transvaal Automobile Club or the Killarney Golf Course. The area attracted many Jews, some of them very affluent. By the 1960-70s, the average residents of Killarney were middle-aged or even elderly. In 1971, Jews made up 71.3% of the population.

From the mid-1970s, the demographic profile became notably older, with mostly middle-age and some elderly residents. It became common for empty nester couples to relocate from larger family homes in Lower Houghton to apartments in Killarney.

According to the 1985 census about half of the suburb’s White population were older than sixty-five. The area was historically classed as a "whites only" area during the apartheid era under the terms of the Group Areas Act, a series of South African laws that restricted residence in urban areas according to racial classifications. Killarney has since become more cosmopolitan. Since the early 1990s, the area has attracted the new multiracial middle-class, and many younger upward-mobile people.

== Geography ==
Killarney is a compact, predominantly residential suburb located between the major hubs of the Johannesburg CBD to the south, and Rosebank to the north. It forms part of Region E of the City of Johannesburg Metropolitan Municipality. The high-density suburb is bisected by the M1 motorway. Its immediate neighbours are Riviera and Houghton Estate to the north, Saxonwold and Forest Town to the west, Upper Houghton to the east, and Parkton to the south. Its position astride the M1 provides direct access to this major north–south transport route, while Oxford Road and Riviera Road provide alternative links to Rosebank, Parktown, and the inner city.

Killarney lies on gently sloping terrain between the higher ground of Houghton Ridge and the lower-lying areas toward the Johannesburg Zoo and Saxonwold. The suburb incorporates the Killarney Mall, Johannesburg’s first shopping mall, which functions as the suburb’s main commercial node. Its location places it within short driving distance of the University of the Witwatersrand, Charlotte Maxeke Johannesburg Academic Hospital, and the business districts of Rosebank and Sandton. There are many schools in the vicinity, the Johannesburg Zoo is nearby, as are two golf courses. There are also other shopping malls and hospitals within a few kilometers.

=== Architecture ===
The suburb is characterised by mid‑rise apartment buildings, some of them Art Deco or early‑modernist in style, set along tree‑lined streets.

Whitehall Court, a three-storey Neoclassical building, was designed by Australian immigrant architect, John Abraham Moffat, in 1923, and commissioned by I. W. Schlesinger. One half of the second floor was originally one large apartment for Schlesinger. The remaining part of the buildings were offices for his business interest. After the Second World War, the building was reconceived as private apartments.

Daventry Court, an Art Deco building on Riviera Road, was built in 1933-34 and is regarded as one of the first multi-storey apartment block in the suburb. It was commissioned and financed by Samuel Hillel and Woolfe Jossel, through their property development company, Jossels Mansions. It was designed by Leopold Grinker, along with Israel Wayburne and Hugh Robert Skelly. In 1936, an extension to the building, along 4th Avenue was completed by Swiss architect, Theophile Schaerer and local architect, Charles Small.

== Notable residents ==
- Mark Gevisser
- Peter Tucker
- Hugh Lewin (1939-2019), anti-apartheid activist and writer, lived and died in Killarney
- Thelma Gutsche (1915-1984), scholar, historian and film writer, lived in Gleneagles apartment building
- Amina Cachalia (1930-2013), anti-apartheid activist and politician
- Stephen Gray (1941-2020), writer and literary critic
- Ronnie Kasrils, politician and activist
- Arthur Ginsburg (1933-2007), inventor of Chappies bubblegum, lived in Killarney until his death
- Dolly Maisels, daughter of Sammy Marks and aunt of Israel A. Maisels
- Harry Morris, lawyer who defended Daisy de Melker
