= New Guelderland =

- Location within KwaZulu-Natal Location within South Africa
- Coordinates: 29.320°S 31.332°E
- Country: South Africa
- Province: KwaZulu-Natal
- District: iLembe
- Municipality: KwaDukuza
- Time zone: UTC+2 (SAST)

New Guelderland is a town in KwaDukuza in the KwaZulu-Natal province of South Africa.

It was established in 1859, when Theodorus Colenbrander brought a party of 80 Dutch immigrants to his settlement and named it after Guelderland in the Netherlands.
