= Mabel May (actress) =

British-South African actress (1892–1957)

- Born: Mabel Florence Ayling; 21 April 1892; England
- Died: 9 November 1957 (aged 65); Johannesburg, South Africa
- Occupation: Actress
- Spouse: I. W. Schlesinger (died. 1949)

Mabel May (birth name Mabel Florence Ayling, 21 April 1892 – 9 November 1957) was a British-South African actress. She was known for her starring role as Marie Moxter in Dick Cruikshanks's 1918 film The Symbol of Sacrifice.

May was born in England to Frederick and Florence Ayling of ethnic English origins. She married I. W. Schlesinger and worked at his African Film Productions studio, appearing in numerous films made by the studio. She emigrated to South Africa shortly after World War I.

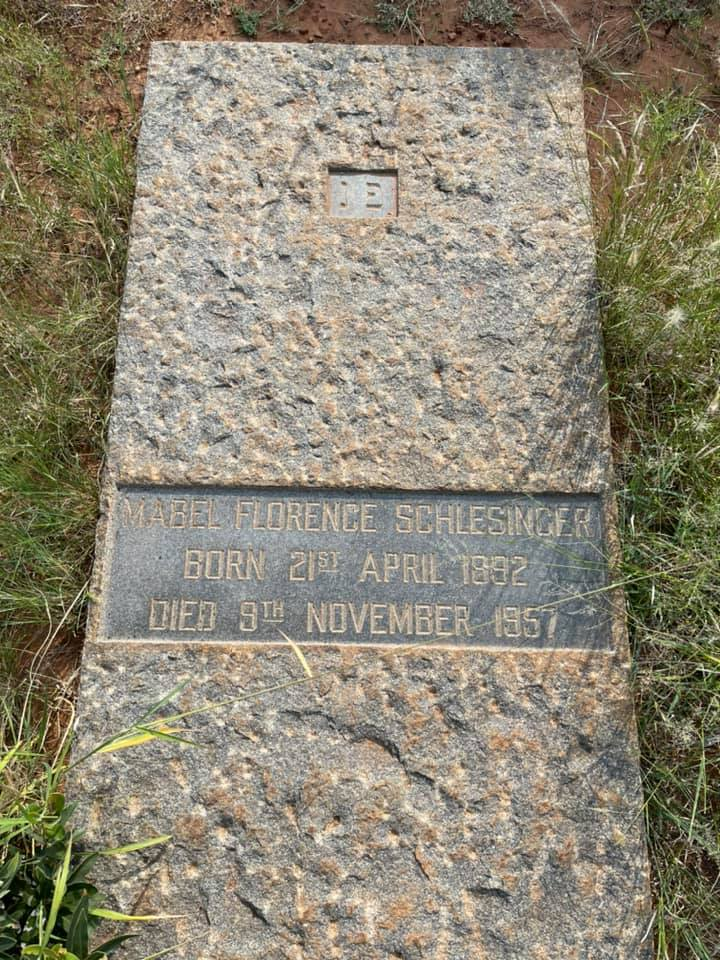
Mabel May Schlesinger grave at Zebediela

May died on 9 November 1957 in Johannesburg, South Africa, at the age of 65. She is buried next to her husband at Zebediela.

== Filmography ==
- The Artist's Dream/The Artist's Inspiration (1915)
- A Border Scourge (1917) as Ray Elman
- The Symbol of Sacrifice (1918) as Marie Moxter, the film is a drama about the Zulu War
- The Stolen Favourite (1919)
- With Edged Tools (1919) as Millicent Chyne
- The Madcap of the Veld (1921)
