= I. W. Schlesinger =

American-born South African business tycoon and entertainment industry pioneer

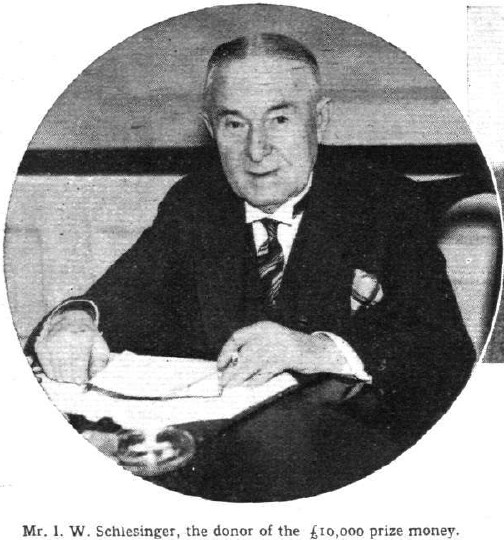
- Schlesinger in 1936
- Born: Isidore William Schlesinger; September 15, 1871; Lemešany (Lemes), Austria-Hungary
- Died: March 11, 1949 (aged 77); Johannesburg, South Africa
- Burial place: Zebediela, Limpopo, South Africa
- Other name: Isidore Williem
- Occupation: Businessman
- Spouse: Mabel May
- Children: 1

Isidore William Schlesinger (Lemešany, Austria-Hungary, 15 September 1871 – Johannesburg, 11 March 1949) was a business tycoon and pioneer of the South African Entertainment industry. At 1.58 metres tall, he was nicknamed "Little Man", and was a significant figure in the South African Business world with interests in numerous economic sectors.

== Background and youth ==
Schlesinger was the second son of 10 children of Abraham Schlesinger, a Hungarian-Jewish émigré. The European branch of the family owned a sawmill in the Tatra Mountains (part of the Carpathian Mountains) on the border of what would later be Czechoslovakia. Since the mill could not support the entire family, two brothers, Abraham and Moritz, emigrated to the United States of America. They began to work there as woodcutters. Abraham went on to found a cigar factory and later a bank.

Schlesinger spent his childhood on the outskirts of the Bowery, on the East Side of New York City, where as a boy, he helped the family make an income by forging hair clips and selling newspapers. At the age of eighteen, he became a commissioner and insurance salesman.

== Coming to South Africa ==
After Schlesinger read of the discovery of gold in the Witwatersrand, he traveled to the South Africa Republic in 1894 against his family's wishes. In Johannesburg, he at first worked as a traveling salesman of American goods, but began working for the Equitable Insurance Company when he realized it would be more profitable, and became a highly successful insurance agent, exceeding all records in the field. Over the course of two years, Schlesinger prospered, earning £1,000 in commission selling policies on journeys throughout South Africa and German South West Africa. He thereby gained a detailed knowledge of the land and its people, and his clients included the chiefs of Swaziland.

== Insurer, property developer, and financier ==
According to one source, Schlesinger was appointed regional manager by Equitable in Ireland on the eve of the Second Boer War. According to another source, he was still an American citizen during the war and enjoyed considerable freedom as such, until the disruption to commerce led him to return to America, from there moving on to Ireland to sell the same insurance. After the war, in any case, he returned to Johannesburg to launch a property development firm, the African Realty Trust. Until 1904, the Trust developed new neighborhoods in Port Elizabeth (Mount Pleasant) and Johannesburg (Orange Grove, Houghton, Parkmore and Killarney) where salary-earners were given the opportunity to mortgage homes, a first in South Africa.

At the end of 1904, he founded his first Insurance company, the African Life Assurance Society, with the £20,000 he had earned from the development of the suburb of Parkhurst. During its first year in business, the company sold 2,274 policies worth £1 million, a record for a new business in the industry at the time. As managing director, he organized the entire company from the boardroom to the stationery box and personally coached all recruiters and agents.

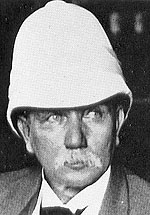
Joseph Robinson

In 1905, he bought the financially struggling Robinson South African Bank (founded by Sir Joseph Robinson) and converted it into the Colonial Banking and Trust Company, which specialized in small business loans. In 1911, he founded the African Guarantee and Indemnity Corporation to provide all types of insurance.

== Entertainment industry ==
In 1913, Schlesinger for the first time entered the entertainment industry with the purchase of the Empire Theatre in Johannesburg for £60,000, at a time when such businesses were loss leaders. He converted the insolvent business into a flourishing business named African Consolidated Theatres, which provided a central organization for the national distribution of movies and variety shows from the Cape of Good Hope to the Zambezi River. He teamed up with architect Percy Rogers Cooke, appointing him within African Consolidated Theatres to design the Colosseum Theatre in Johannesburg, as well as other theatres in towns across the country, including Pretoria (The Capitol), Cape Town (The Alhambra), Durban, Benoni, Brakpan, Springs and Witbank.

Another business he founded was African Film Productions, whose weekly "African Mirror" was the first South African newsreel. It was the first South African film studio.

In the 1920s, Schlesinger helped found South Africa's first radio stations when he took over the struggling national broadcasting service, which at the time had only 20,000 license holders. The African Broadcasting Company (ABC) he founded in 1930 had 125,000 licence holders by the time it was nationalized as the South African Broadcasting Corporation.

== Farming operations ==
Schlesinger had worked for commercial farm companies and founded several large pineapple plantations at Langholm near Grahamstown, leading him to found a cannery in Port Elizabeth for the product, named the African Canning and Packing Corporation. Thus began the pineapple industry in the eastern provinces. In Kendrew, near Graaff-Reinet, he began intensively irrigated citrus production, but catchment problems doomed the project. In 1917, in Zebediela, Northern Transvaal (Limpopo), he purchased a large tract of land and started developing Zebediela Citrus Estate, which would eventually become the largest single citrus plantation in the world. Schlesinger also owned 80,000 merino sheep.

== Business magnate ==
In the early 1930s, by virtue of the success of his insurance firms, Schlesinger owned a large network of cinemas and theaters. He owned controlling interests in retailers, banks, advertising agencies, a hotel chain, Catering firms, theme parks, agriculture, canneries, diamond grinders, and newspapers, and was the chairman of more than 80 companies. His effort to found a large trust, however, failed afterwards; so did his entry into the Johannesburg newspaper market with the Sunday Express and his news service, Africopa. The competition from established outlets such as The Star and The Rand Daily Mail, and the South African Press Association (SAPA), respectively, was too strong, but his advertising agency was one of the largest in the region. Schlesinger sold off his remaining newspaper interests in 1939, parts of the Sunday Express going to Rand Daily Mails Ltd. (£44,047), The Sunday Times Syndicate Ltd. (£49,286), and the Argus Printing and Publishing Company Ltd. (£206,667). The Sunday Express published until 1939, when paper shortages during World War II halted it. It would not resume publication until September 1945. Schlesinger also started the Daily Express in Johannesburg and the Daily Tribune and Sunday Tribune in Durban. Of these four papers, only the Sunday Tribune continues today.

== Appraisal ==
Dr. M. Arkin described Schlesinger as "a short, sturdily built man, ...always dressed impeccably, [who] devoured all kinds of reading material. 'I.W.', as his colleagues and staff called him, was someone with great [physical] energy who worked long hours, especially when it came to businesses which served as a touchstone for his salesmanship and economic acumen. He enjoyed launching new businesses with plans to the finest detail, and exercised control over practically all of his companies. He conveyed his authority to others, however, with the utmost reluctance."

== Personal life and death ==
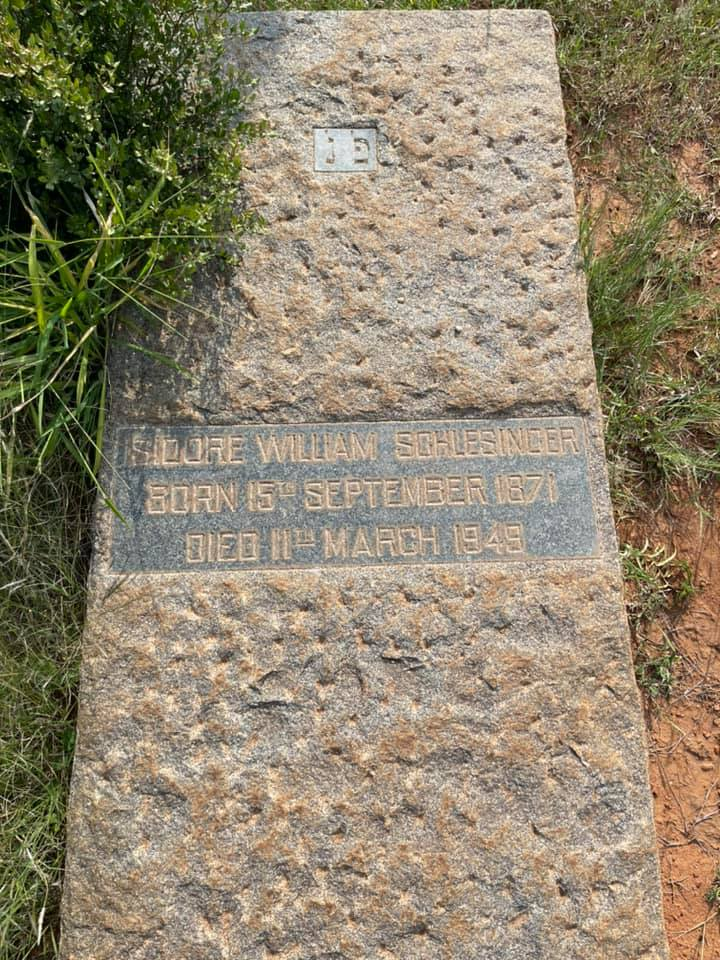
Gravestone of Isidore W. Schlesinger at Zebediela

Schlesinger married Mabel May, at the time a well-known actress in Johannesburg. Their only son, John Samuel Schlesinger (born in 1923), was educated at Michaelhouse, Natal, and graduated from Harvard University. With the death of his father in 1949, he took over the enormous Schlesinger organization.

During his last years, I.W. Schlesinger was badly afflicted by arthritis. He continued to be actively involved in his businesses, however, remaining as chairman of dozens of companies. Though proud of his second homeland, he never gave up his American citizenship. He is buried in Zebediela.

== Honours ==
In 2024, at the South African Jewish Board of Deputies' 120th anniversary gala dinner, he was honoured among 100 remarkable Jewish South Africans who have contributed to South Africa. The ceremony included speeches from Chief Rabbi Ephraim Mirvis, and Schlesinger was honoured among other business figures such as Raymond Ackerman, Barney Barnato, Sol Kerzner and Donald Gordon.
