= Kendrew =

- Location within Eastern Cape Location within South Africa
- Coordinates: 32.480°S 24.493°E
- Country: South Africa
- Province: Eastern Cape
- District: Sarah Baartman
- Municipality: Dr Beyers Naudé

Area
  - Total: 63.29 km^{2} (24.44 sq mi)

Population (2011)
  - Total: 57
  - Density: 0.90/km^{2} (2.3/sq mi)

Racial makeup (2011)
  - Black African: 3.5%
  - Coloured: 82.5%
  - White: 14.0%

First languages (2011)
  - Afrikaans: 91.2%
  - English: 7.0%
  - Xhosa: 1.8%
- Time zone: UTC+2 (SAST)

Kendrew is a small settlement in Dr Beyers Naudé Local Municipality in the Eastern Cape province of South Africa.
