= James Sant =

English painter (1820–1916)

James Sant RA CVO
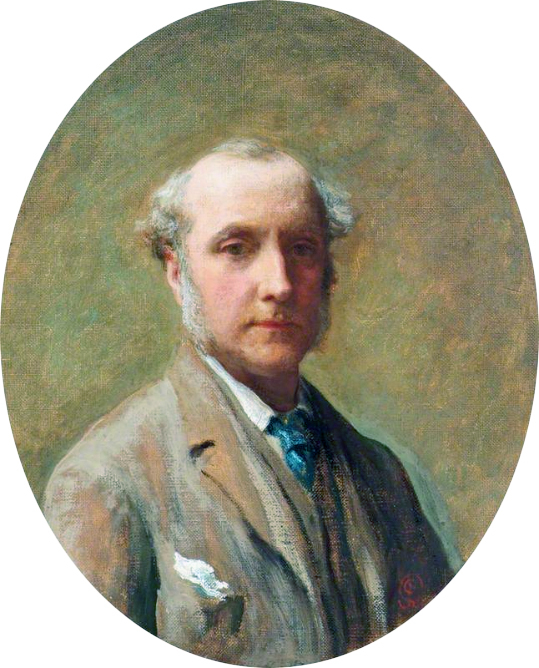
- Self-portrait, 1884; Aberdeen Archives, Art Gallery & Museums
- Born: James Sant; 23 April 1820; London, United Kingdom of Great Britain and Ireland
- Died: 12 Jul 1916 (aged 96); London, United Kingdom of Great Britain and Ireland
- Education: Royal Academy Schools
- Occupation: Court & Society Painter
- Known for: Royal portraitist
- Notable work: Queen Victoria; The Royal Family; Capt. Colin Mackenzie, Madras Army; Miss Martineau's Garden
- Movement: History painting Symbolism; Romanticism; Academic Art; English School
- Spouse: Elizabeth (Eliza) Thomson
- Children: 6
- Relatives: George Sant RBA (brother); Sarah Sherwood Clarke (sister); Gen. Sir Mowbray Thomson (brother-in-law); John Mount Batten (son-in-law)
- Awards: Royal Victorian Order; Royal Academician; Accademia Raffaello, Italy; Paris Exposition Universelle (1889)
- Patrons: Queen Victoria

James Sant RA CVO (1820–1916) was one of the most eminent English painters of the Victorian era, specialising in portraiture and known particularly for images of aristocratic women and children, with a strong allegorical approach to childhood symbolism. He was an elected member of the Royal Academy and appointed Principal Court Painter in Ordinary to Queen Victoria and the Royal Family.

== Biography ==
Sant was born in Croydon, Surrey, England, on 23 April 1820. He was taught first by the watercolourist John Varley, then by Sir A. Callcott RA, then from the age of twenty was taught by the Royal Academy Schools.

He lived to the age of 96 and exhibited at the Grosvenor Gallery as well as producing nearly three hundred canvases for exhibition at the Academy. The first of these, a portrait of his father, William Sant, was exhibited in 1840; the last was exhibited in 1915.

In 1851 he married Elizabeth (Eliza) Thomson, daughter of Dr R.M.M. Thomson, a surgeon and member of the Agri Horticultural Society of India, and sister of Gen. Sir Mowbray Thomson.

His 1853 picture of The Infant Samuel was his first popular success, and engravings of this by Samuel Cousins and of Little Red Riding Hood and The Soul's Awakening sold in great numbers.

In 1861, twenty-two portraits of friends and relatives of Frances, Lady Waldegrave, known as the Strawberry Hill Collection, were exhibited by Ernest Gambart at his French Gallery in Pall Mall and at the Paris Salon. This enhanced his reputation, and he was elected ARA and later RA; in 1871 he was appointed Principal Painter in Ordinary (official portraitist) to Queen Victoria, having become known for his portraits of the royal children and in particular his 1870 Portrait of Prince Leopold and Princess Beatrice. He was the last artist to hold the title.

Sant is best known for his portraits, particularly of aristocratic women and of children; he was "the emperor of children", in the words of the Athenaeum. Nevertheless, many of his pictures were landscapes and particularly gardens; he also painted seascapes, landscapes with animals, and other subjects, including The Wish Tower, a Martello Tower at Eastbourne. His later pictures are freer in style; some have been favourably compared with the work of the French Impressionists and some have a visionary or mannerist quality; his landscapes could include figures with blank or distorted features or simple silhouettes, such as The nun in Convent Walls (1910). He continued painting into old age; All My Fancy! (1910), an Italian landscape with villa and hills, he painted in bed from memory.

He became a Commander of the Royal Victorian Order (CVO) in 1914 and resigned from the RA in the same year to "make room for younger men". He died in Lancaster Gate, London, on 12 July 1916. His work can be found at the National Gallery, Tate Britain and the National Portrait Gallery in London.

At auction, Sant's work can achieve hundreds of pounds sterling or hundreds of thousands of pounds depending on size, quality and subject matter. Allegorical subjects remain popular; Courage, Anxiety and Despair: Watching the Battle (circa 1850) achieved £61,250 in 2012 and Astronomy almost twice this in 2008.

His The Schoolmaster's Daughter (1870) and Miss Martineau's Garden (1873) are illustrated in Victorian Painters by Jeremy Maas; The Seventh Earl of Cardigan Relating the Story of the Cavalry Charge of Balaclava... (1854) is illustrated in the same volume and in Victorian Painters by Christopher Wood. Many of his works were reproduced as prints during his lifetime; his Courage has since been reproduced as a greetings card and his Hilda Pennington-Mellor, aged three (1880), as a postcard.

Sant's work can also be seen at the Victoria Memorial in Kolkata, India, the Art Gallery of New South Wales in Sydney, Australia and the Yale Center for British Art.

== Family ==
Sant's brother, George Sant RBA (Royal Society of British Artists) (1821–1877), was a landscape painter, and the two brothers occasionally collaborated on paintings. Both James and George Sant were among the notable artist acquaintances of Charles Dodgson (Lewis Carroll); James Sant, his daughter Sarah Fanny and son Jemmy were the subjects of photographic studies by Dodgson.

His sister, Sarah Sherwood Clarke (1825–1906), was also an accomplished artist but all that is presently known of her work is a collection of 48 different views of Scotland from 1854; these were exhibited for the first time at the Watercolours & Works on Paper Fair in London in February 2010. She married Frederick Clarke, Superintendent and later Secretary of the London and South Western Railway.

== Gallery ==
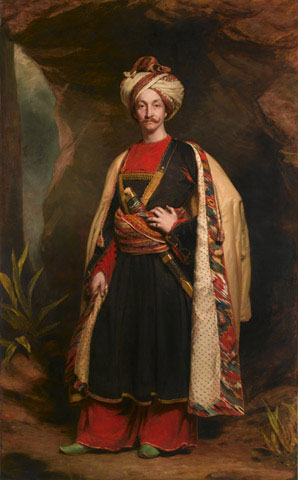
Capt. Colin Mackenzie, Madras Army, lately a hostage in Caubool, in his Affghan Dress, c.1842 (National Army Museum Sandhurst, Indian Army Memorial Room)

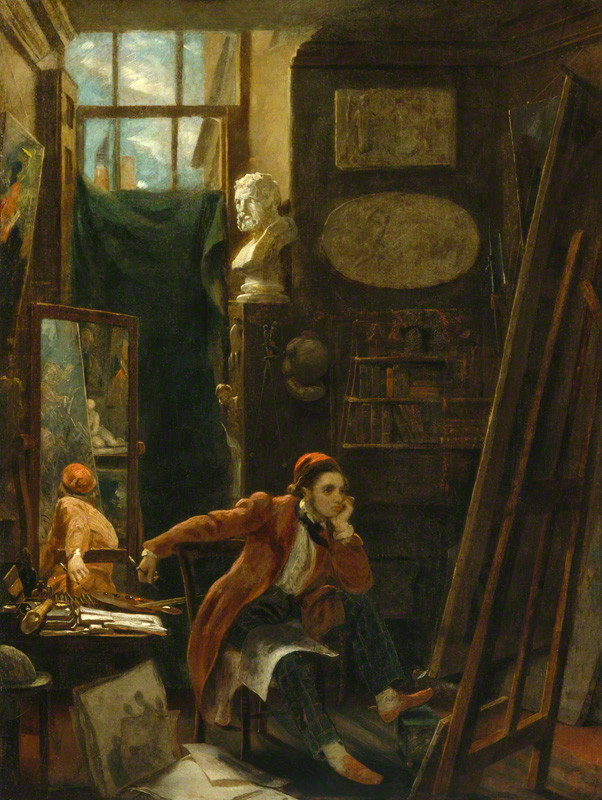
Self-Portrait, 1844
(National Portrait Gallery, London)

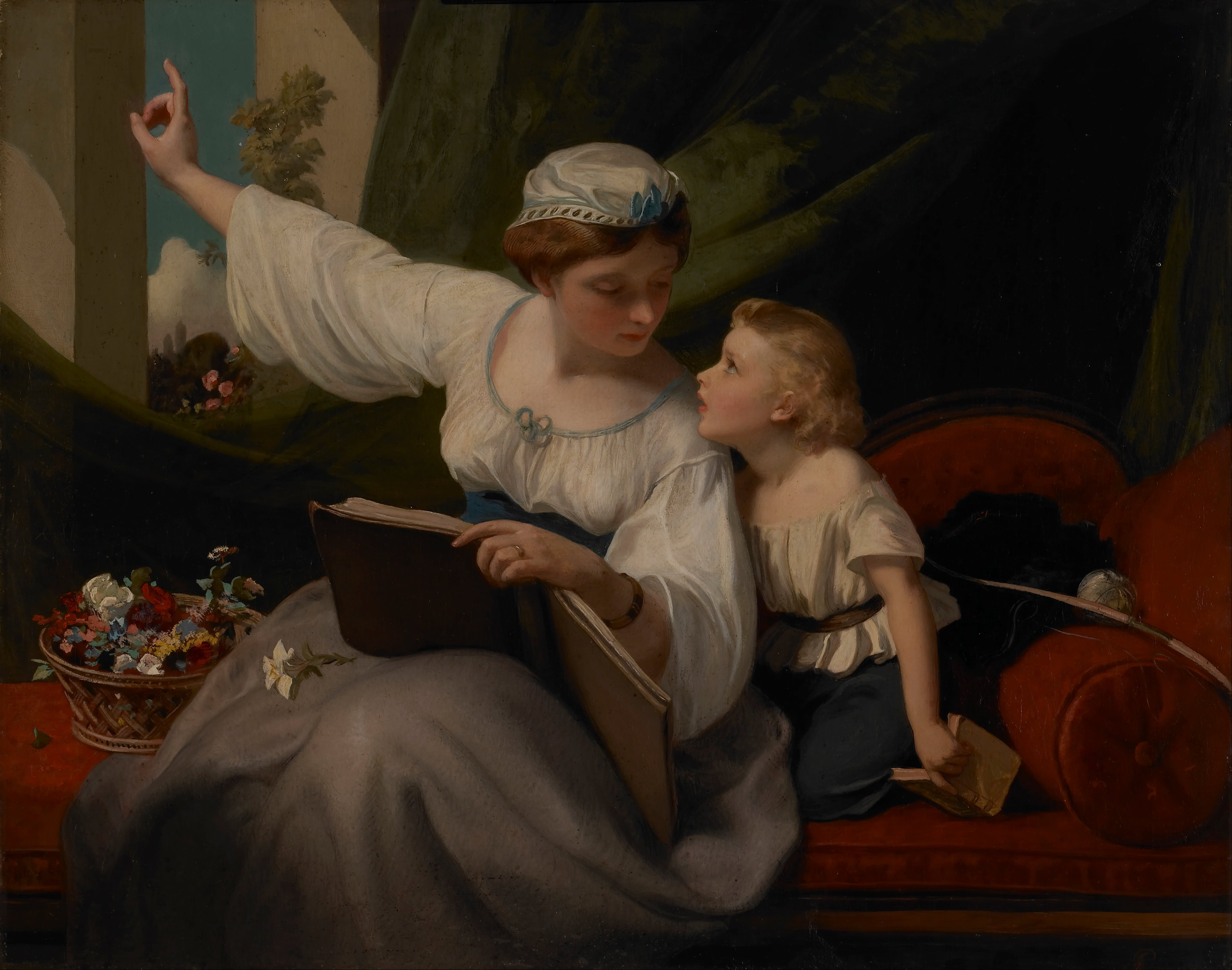
The Fairy Tale, c.1845-1870
(Walker Art Gallery)
@Google Arts & Culture

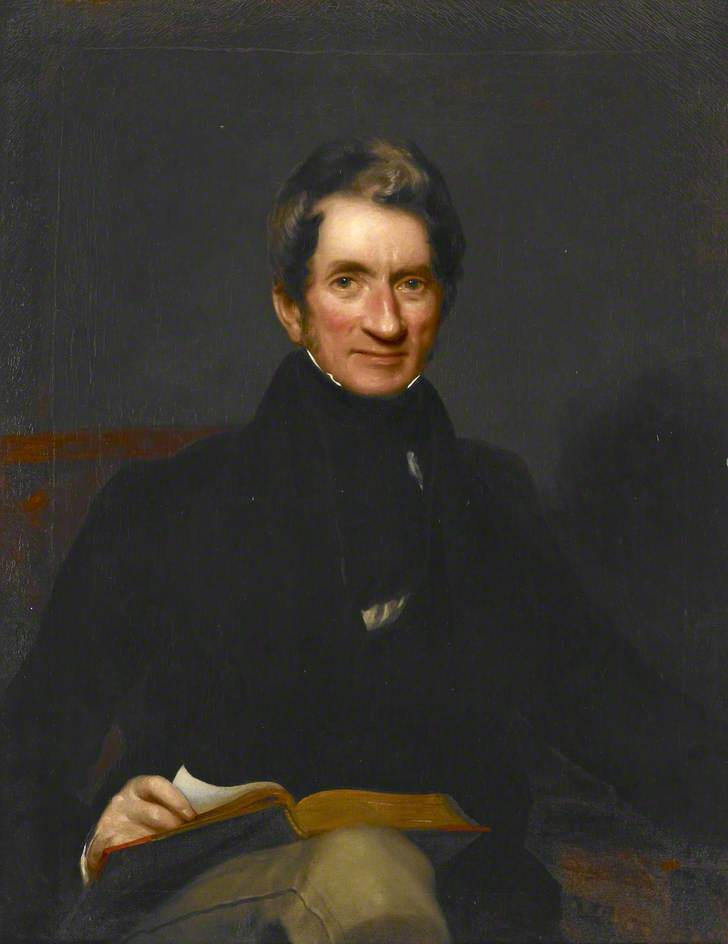
Wigram Money, Bengal Civil Service, c.1840-1845 (British Library Collection)

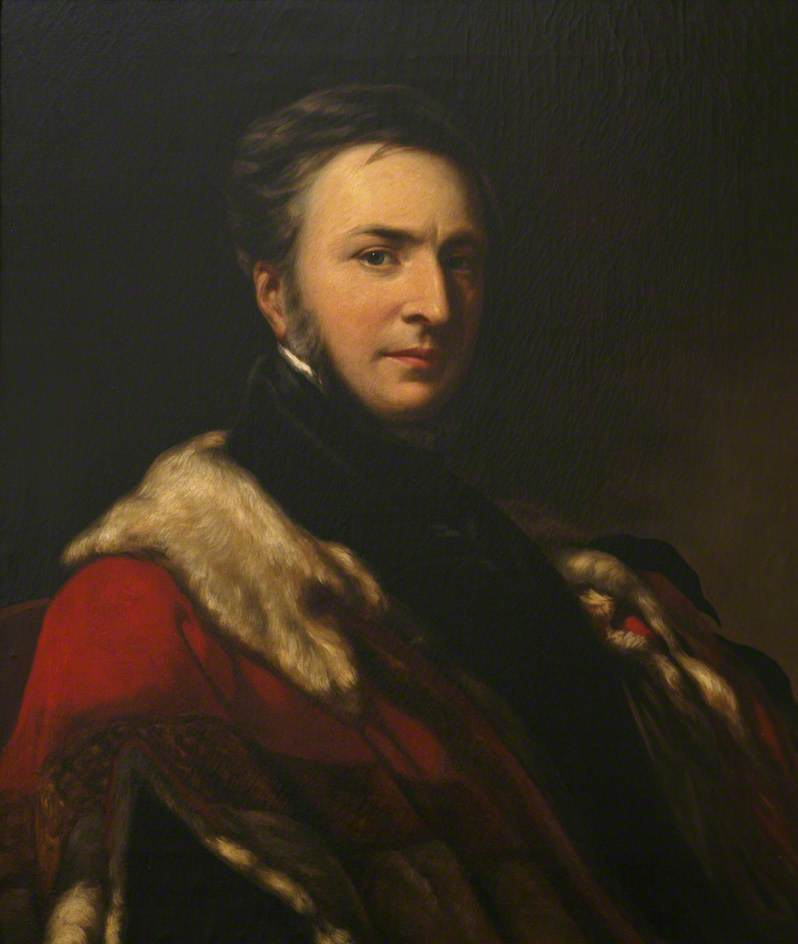
Ernest Edgcumbe, 3rd Earl of Mount Edgcumbe, c.1847 (Mount Edgcumbe House)

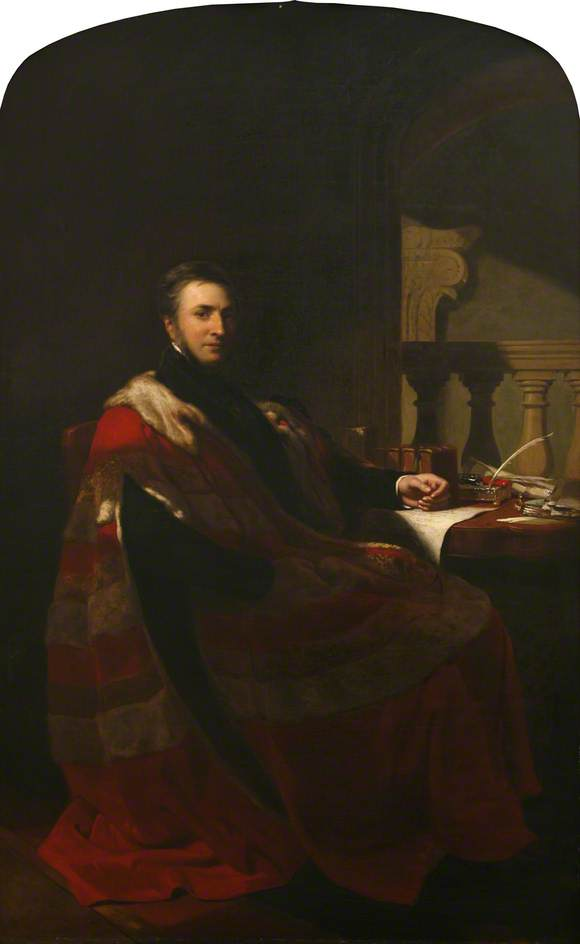
Ernest Edgcumbe,3rd Earl of Edgcumbe, in Peers Robes, c.1847 (Mount Edgcumbe House)

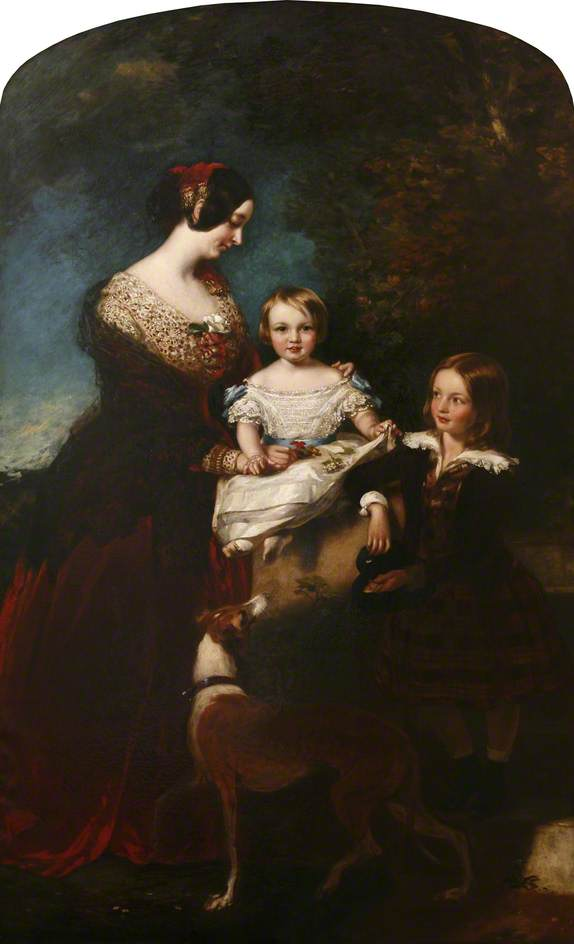
Caroline, 3rd Countess of Mount Edgcumbe with her Children, c.1847 (Mount Edgcumbe House)

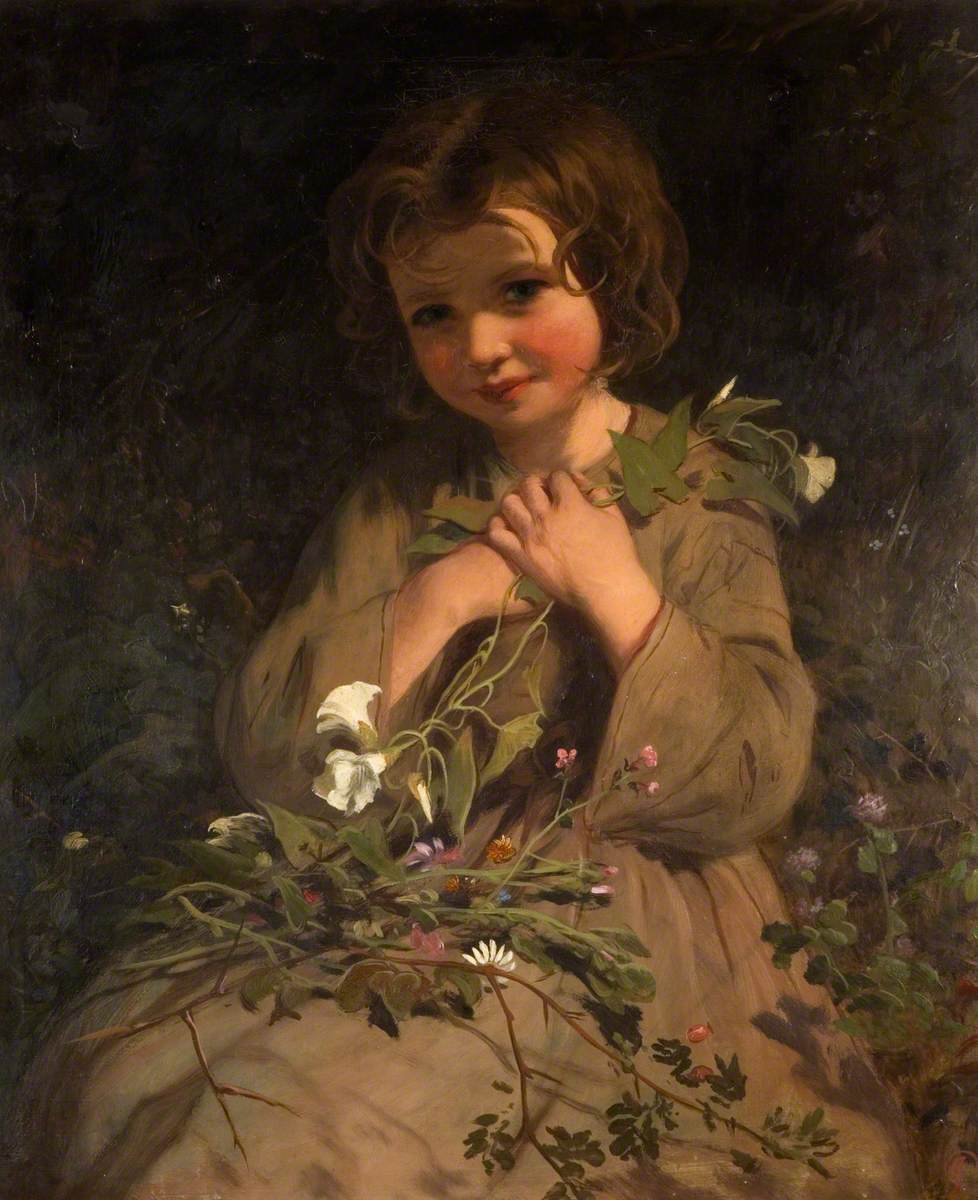
Wild Flowers, 1849
(Wolverhampton Art Gallery)

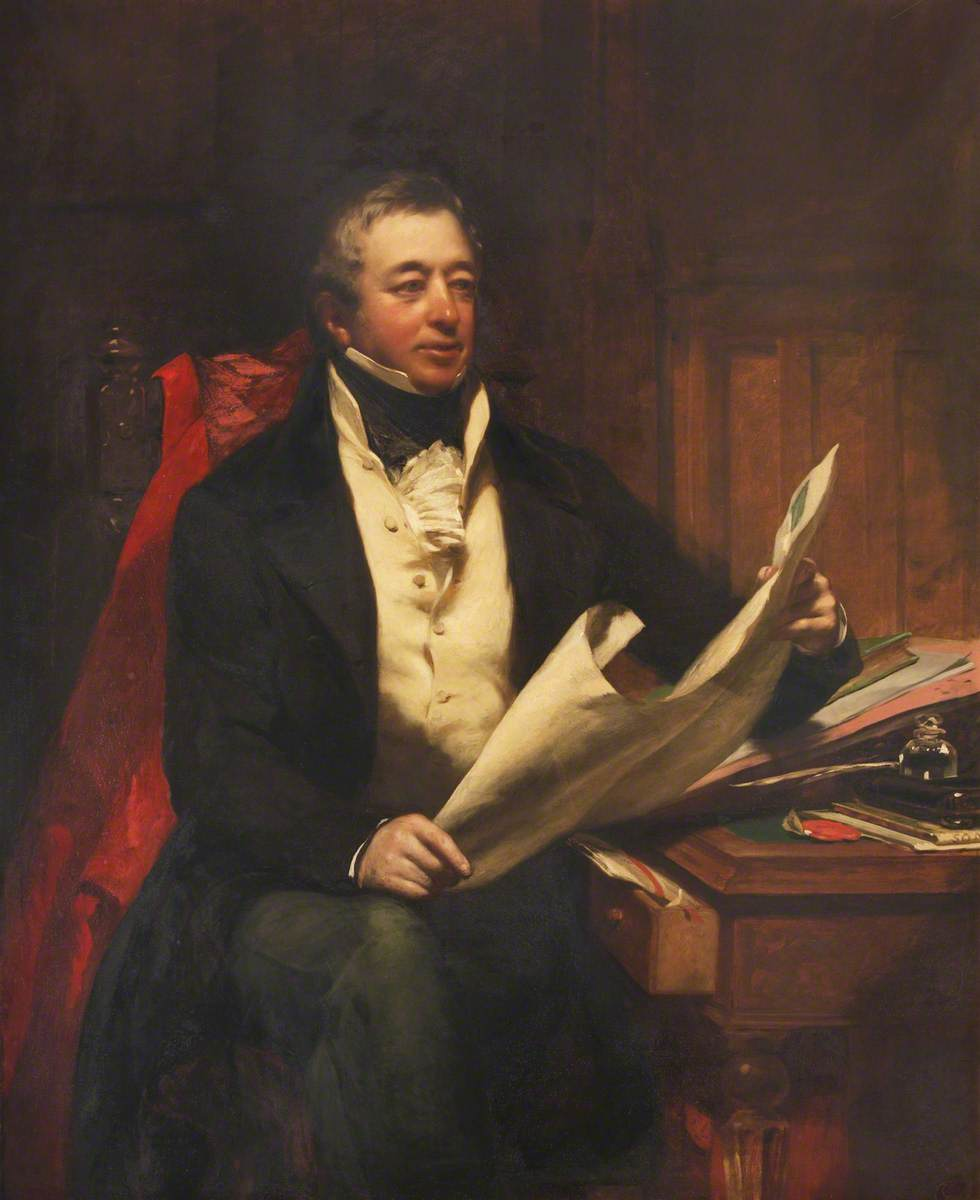
The Bursar (Richard Berens), 1849,
commissioned by (All Souls College, Oxford)

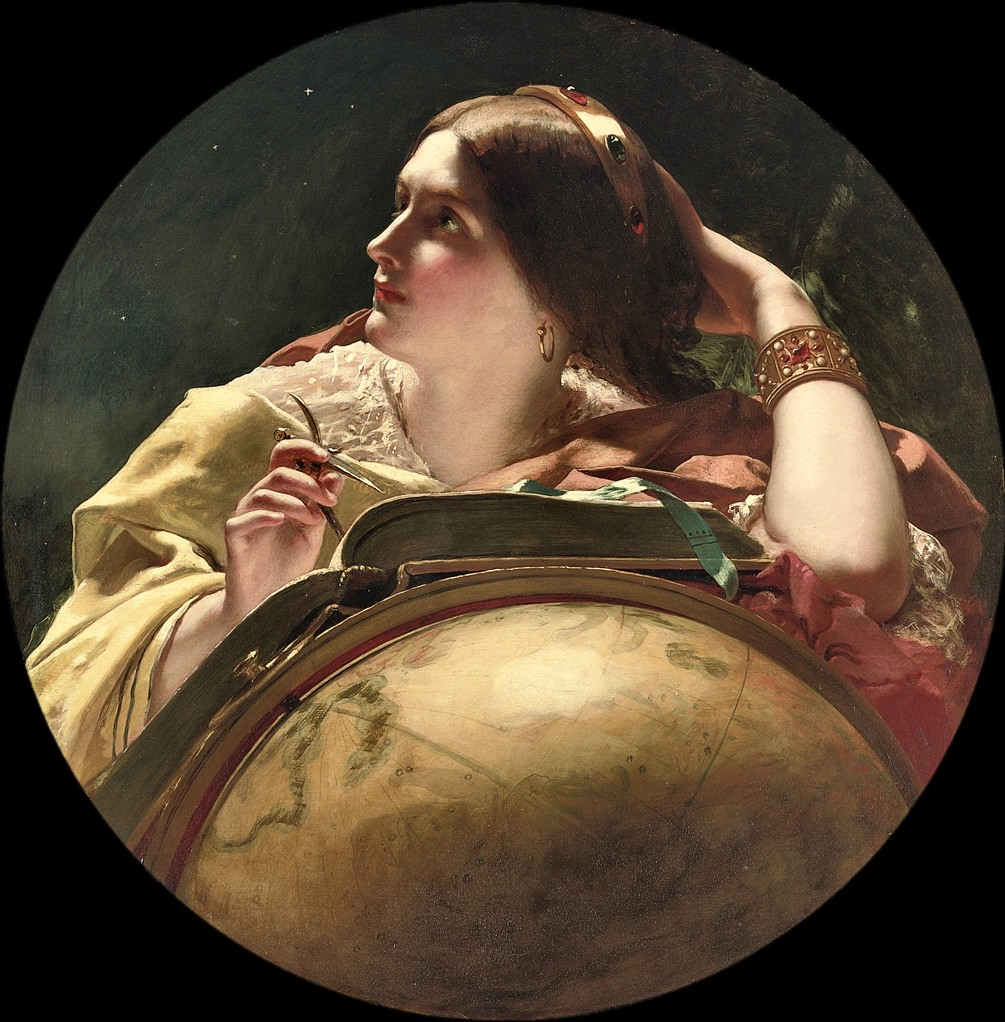
Astronomy, 1850
(Private Collection)

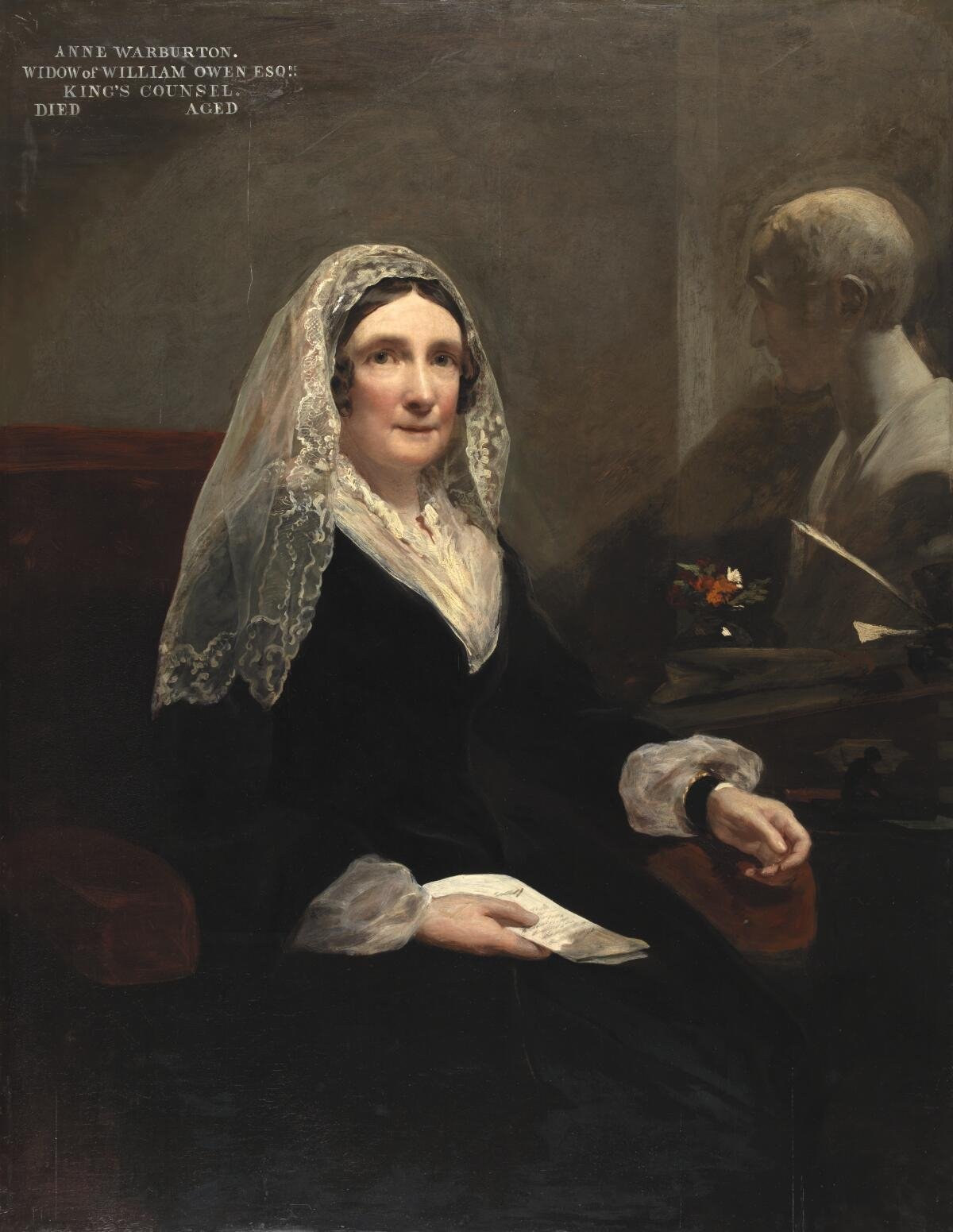
Anne Warburton, c.1850,
(National Library of Wales)

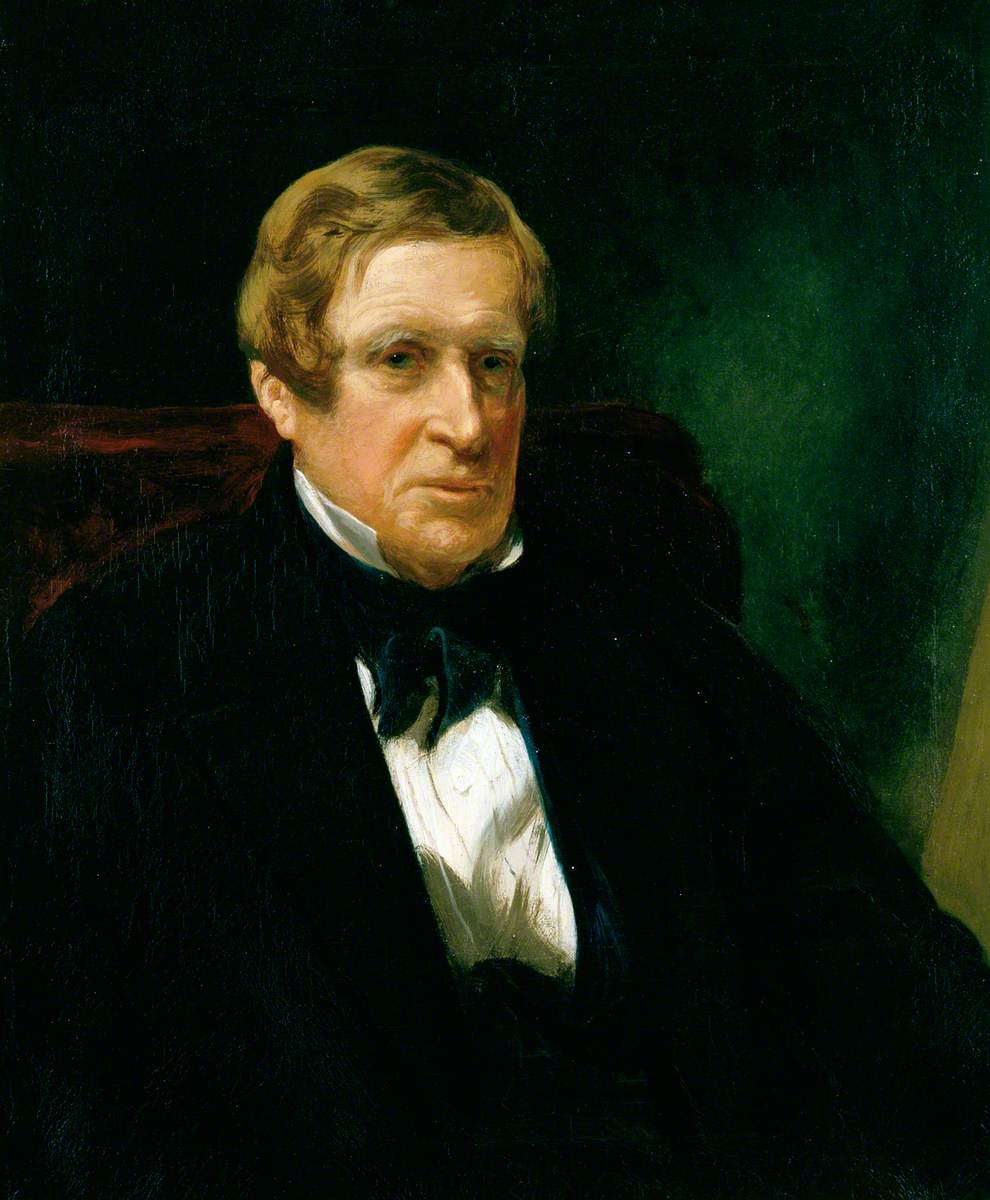
John Singleton Copley, Baron Lyndhurst, Lord Chancellor (Government Art Collection)

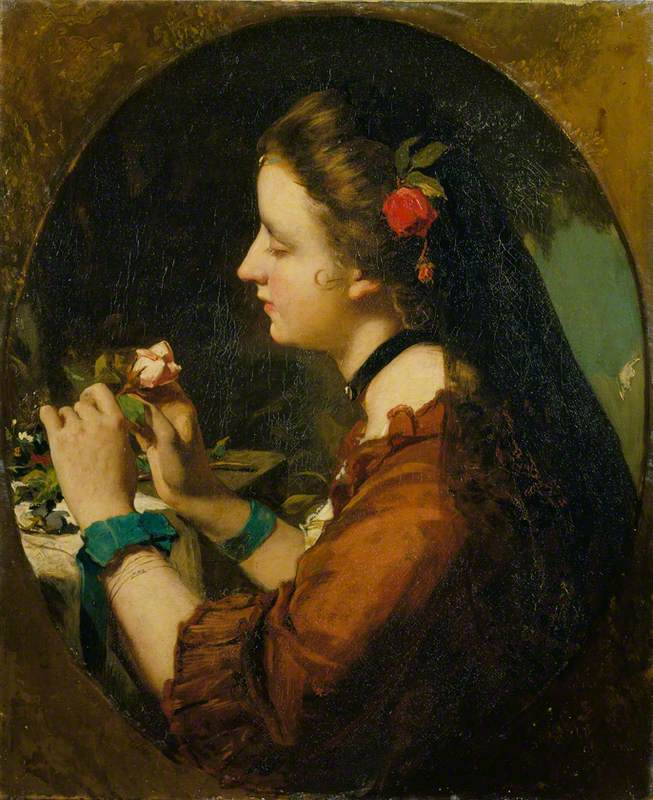
Sentiment, 1852
(The Wallace Collection)

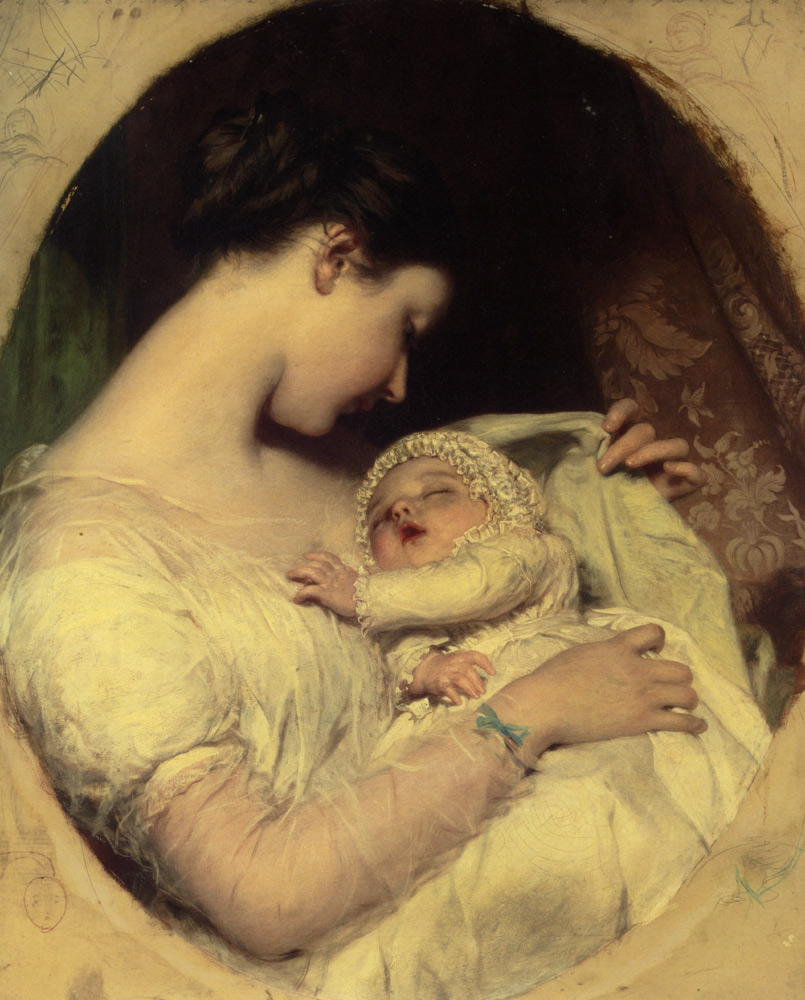
Maternity
Portrait of the artist's wife Elizabeth and daughter, 1852

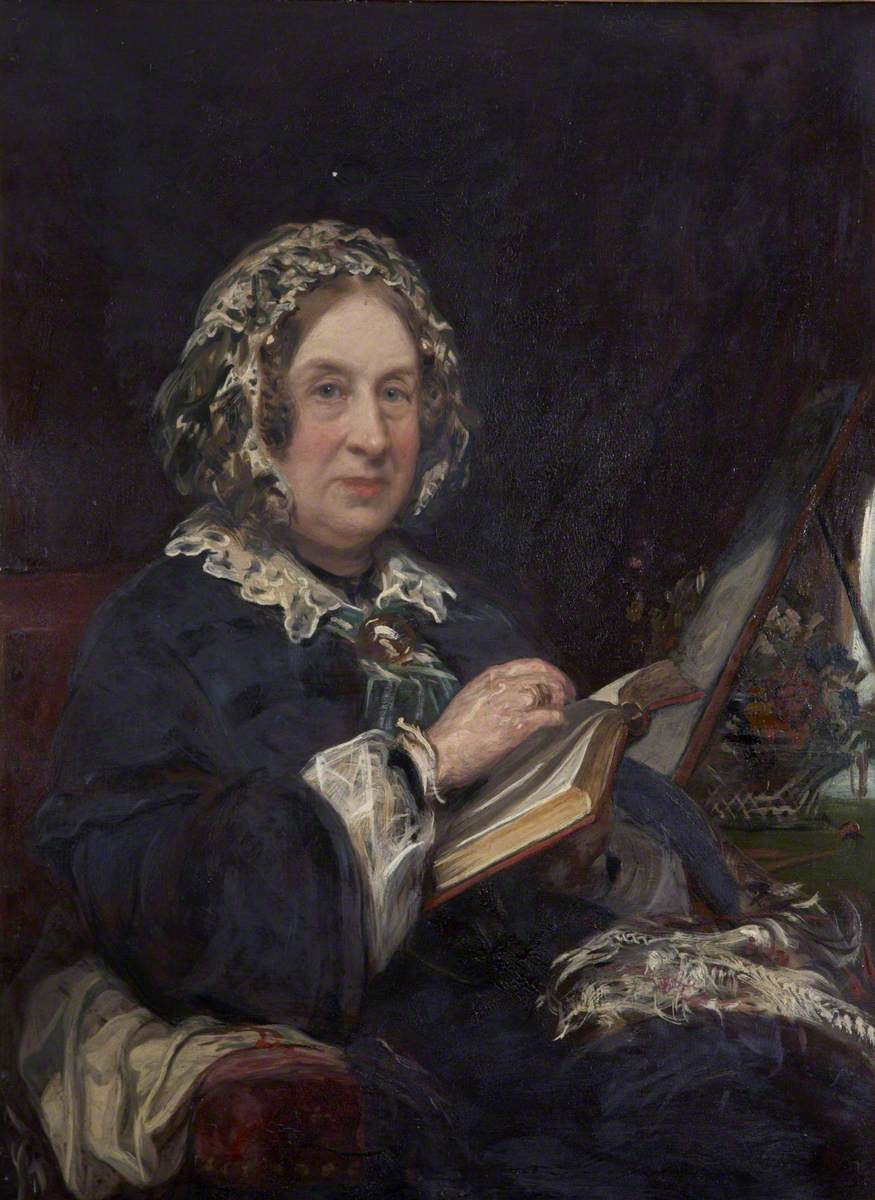
Countess of Morley, c.1852
(National Trust)

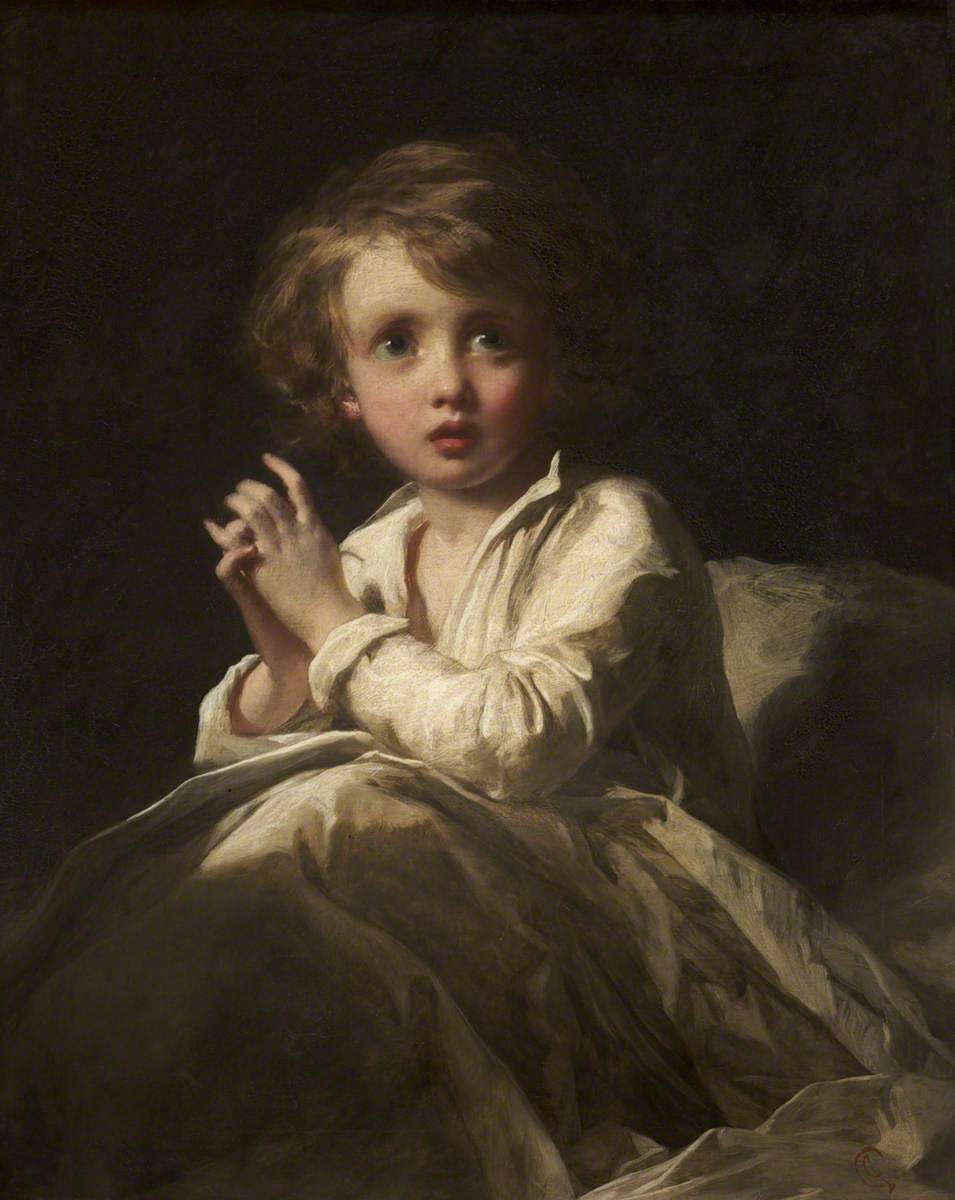
The Infant Samuel, 1853
(Bury Art Museum)

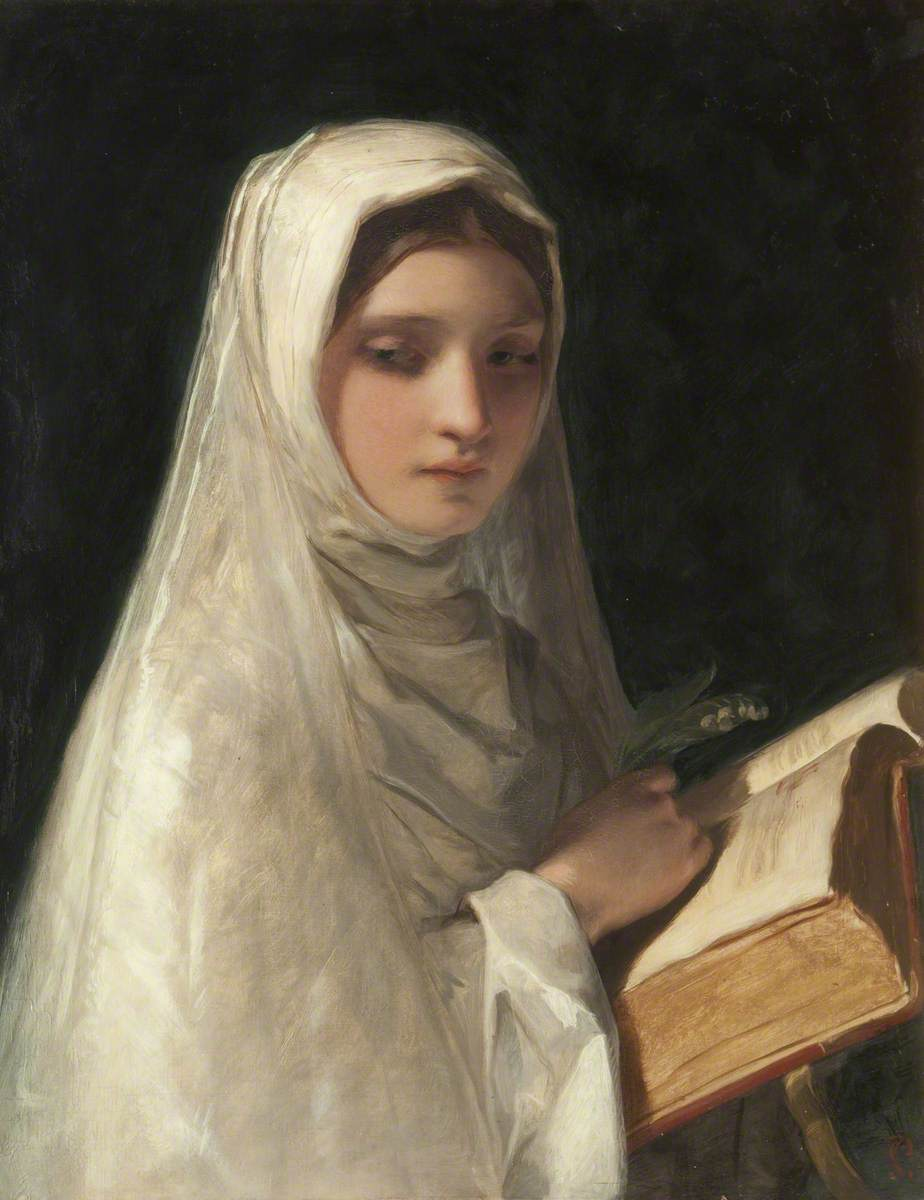
The Novice, 1856
(Harris Museum)

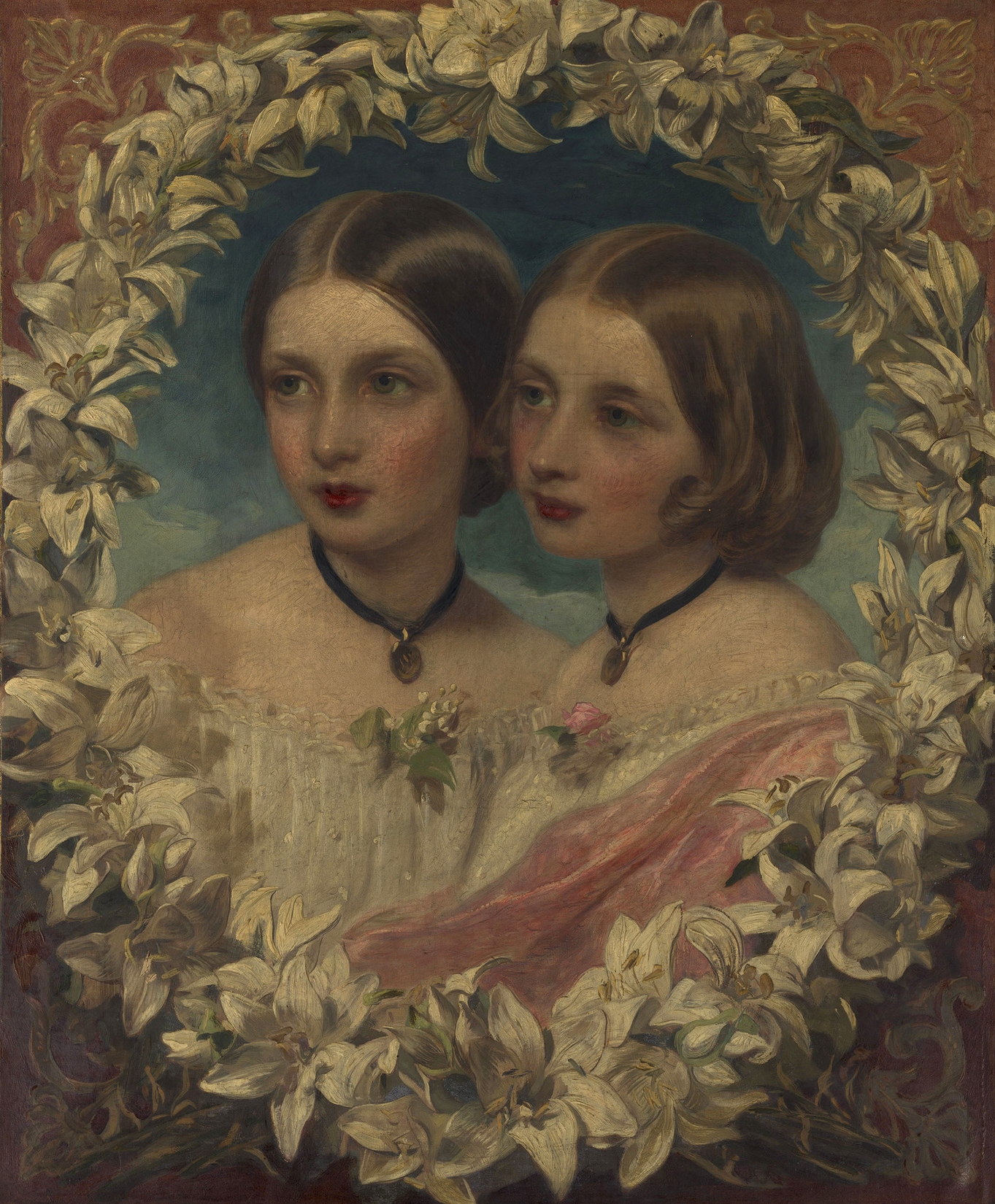
Princess Helena and Princess Luise, 1857
(Royal Collection)

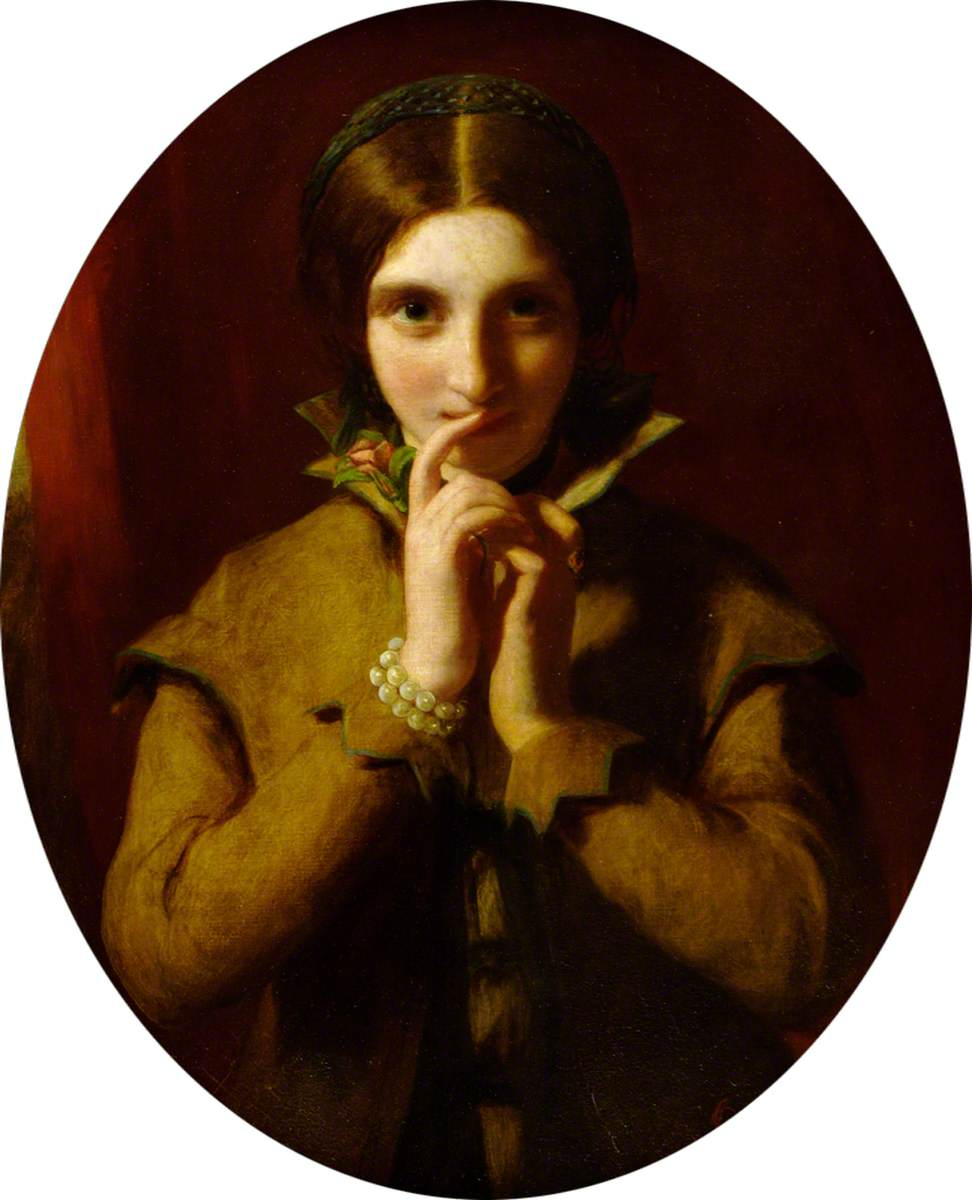
Enigma
(Southampton City Art Gallery)

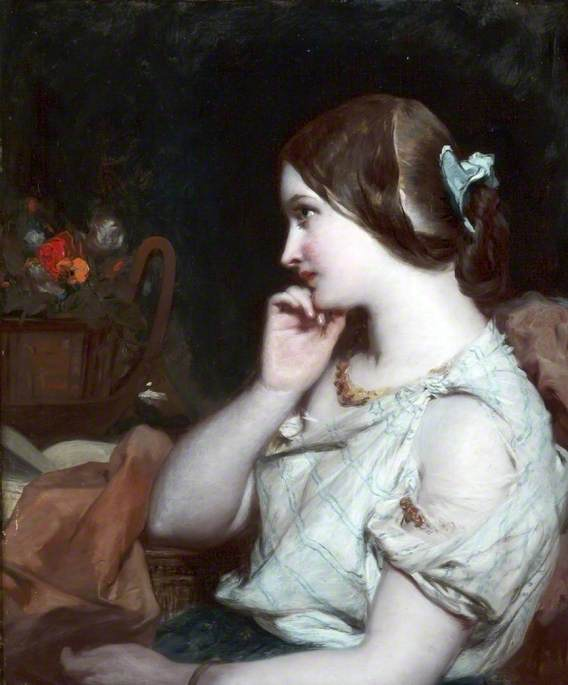
Contemplations (Atkinson Art Gallery and Library)

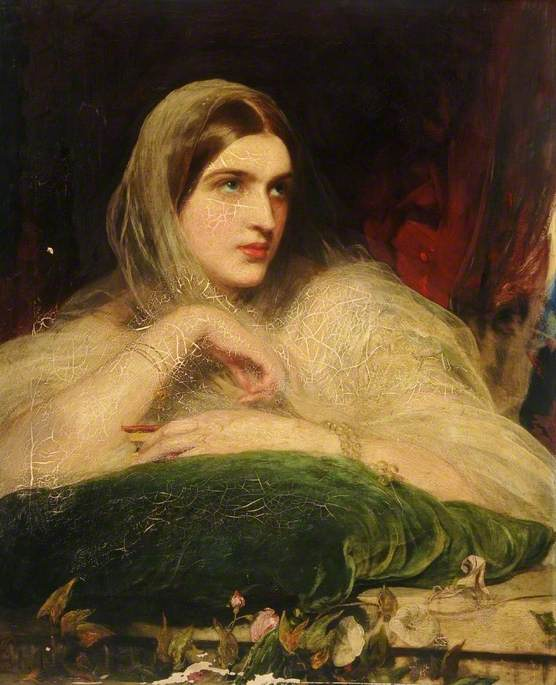
Thought Folded Over
(Danum Gallery, Library and Museum)

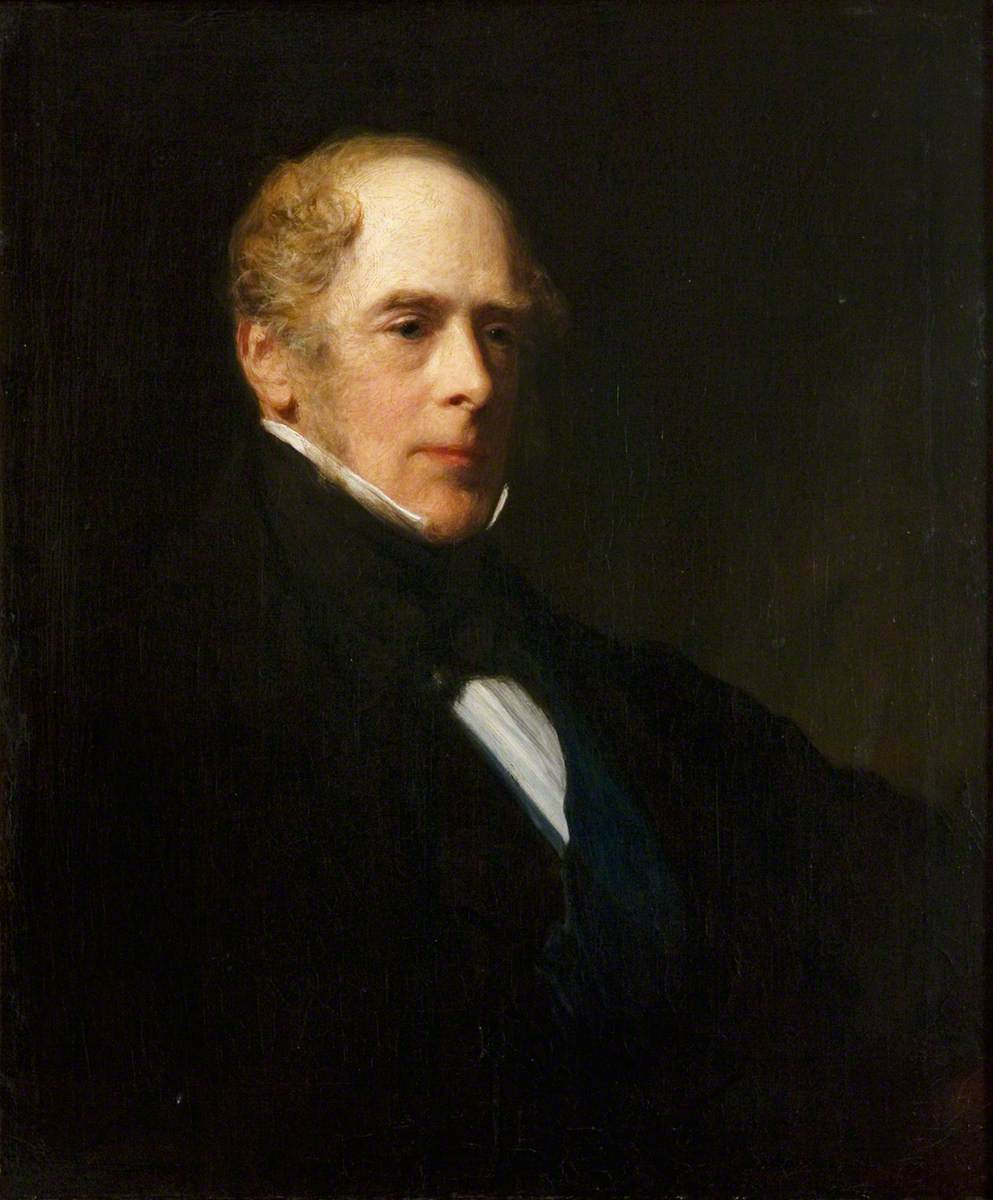
George Villiers, 4th Earl of Clarendon (Government Art Collection)

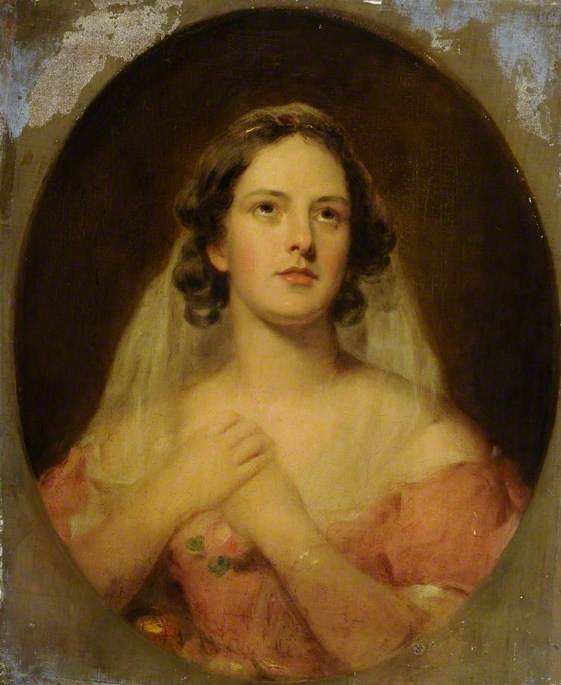
The Bride (Sheffield Museums Trust)

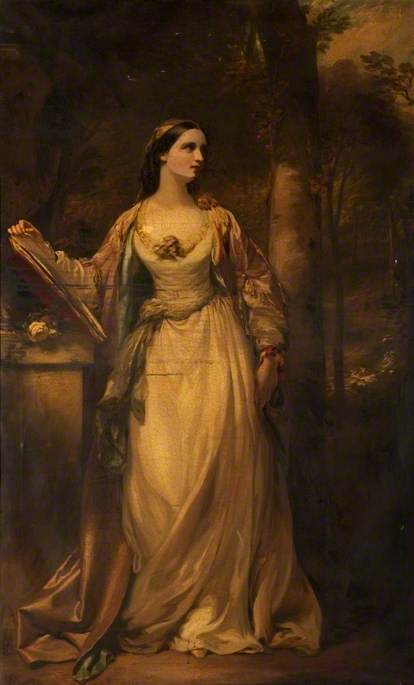
Portrait of a Lady
(Glasgow Museums)

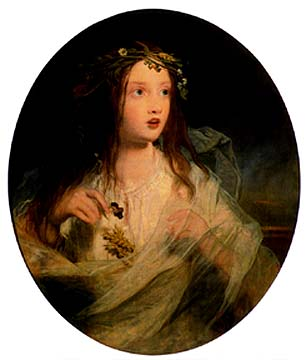
Ophelia

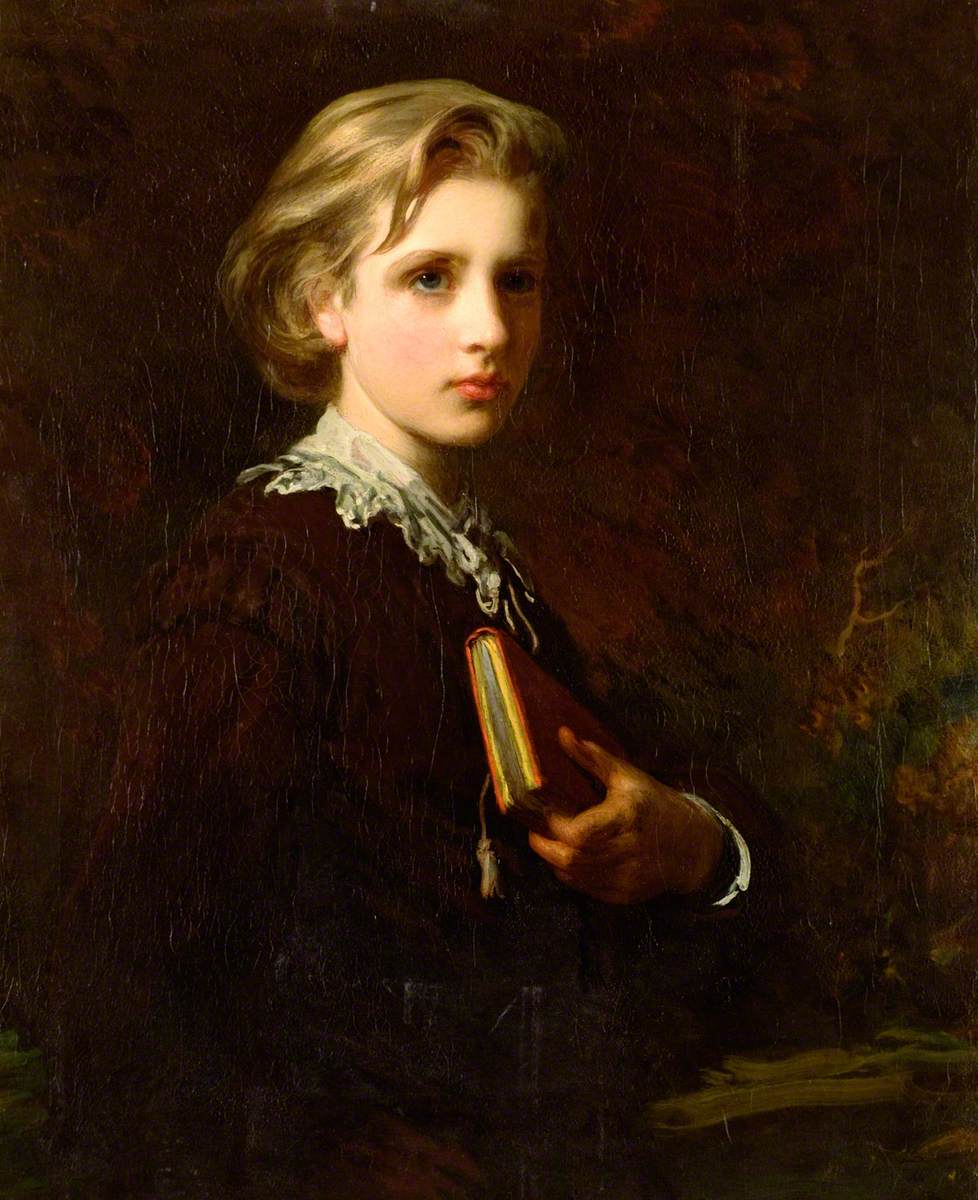
The Student
University of Dundee Fine Art Collections) (Government Art Collection)

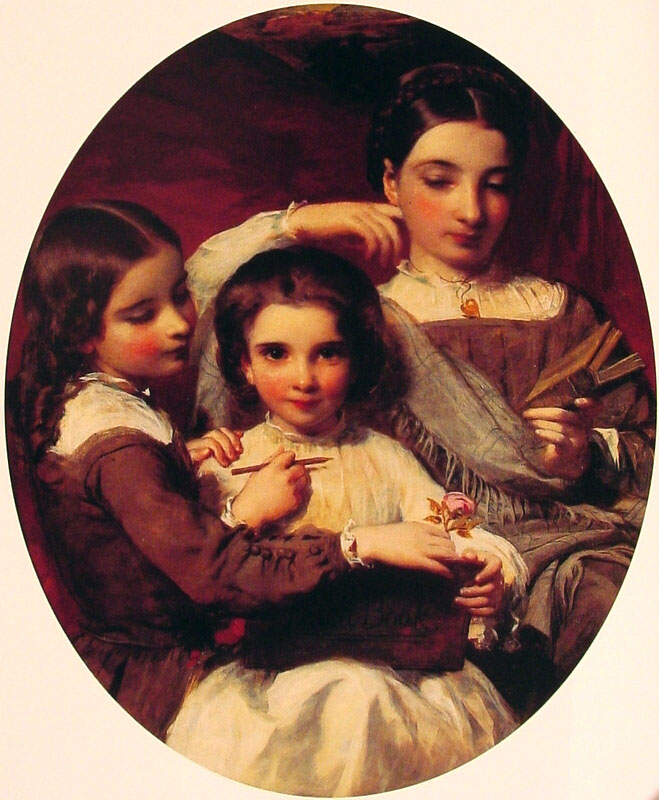
The Russell Sisters, 1858

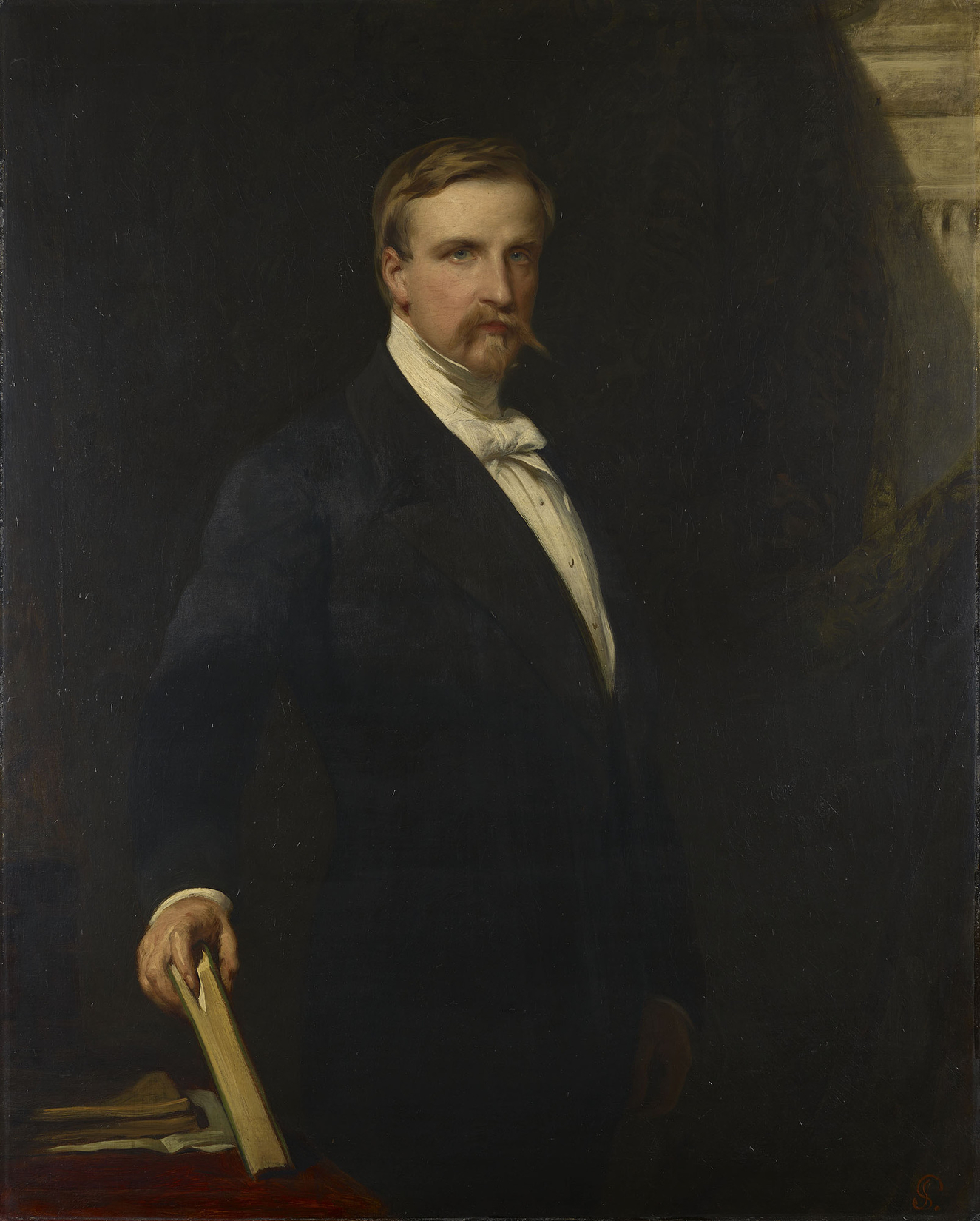
Prince Henri, Duke of Aumale, c.1848-1860
(Royal Collection)

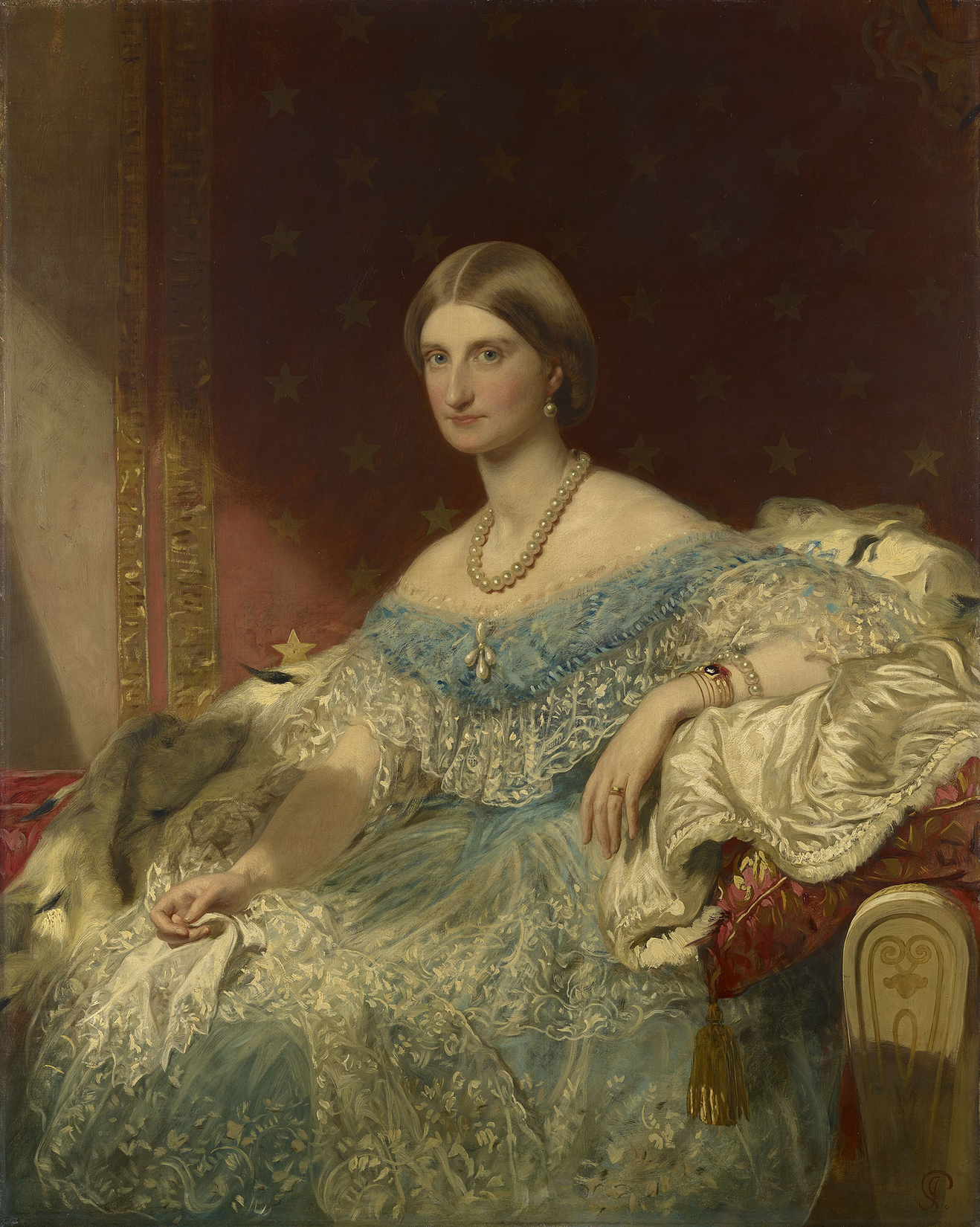
Princess Maria Carolina of Bourbon-Two Sicilies, c.1848-1860
(Royal Collection)

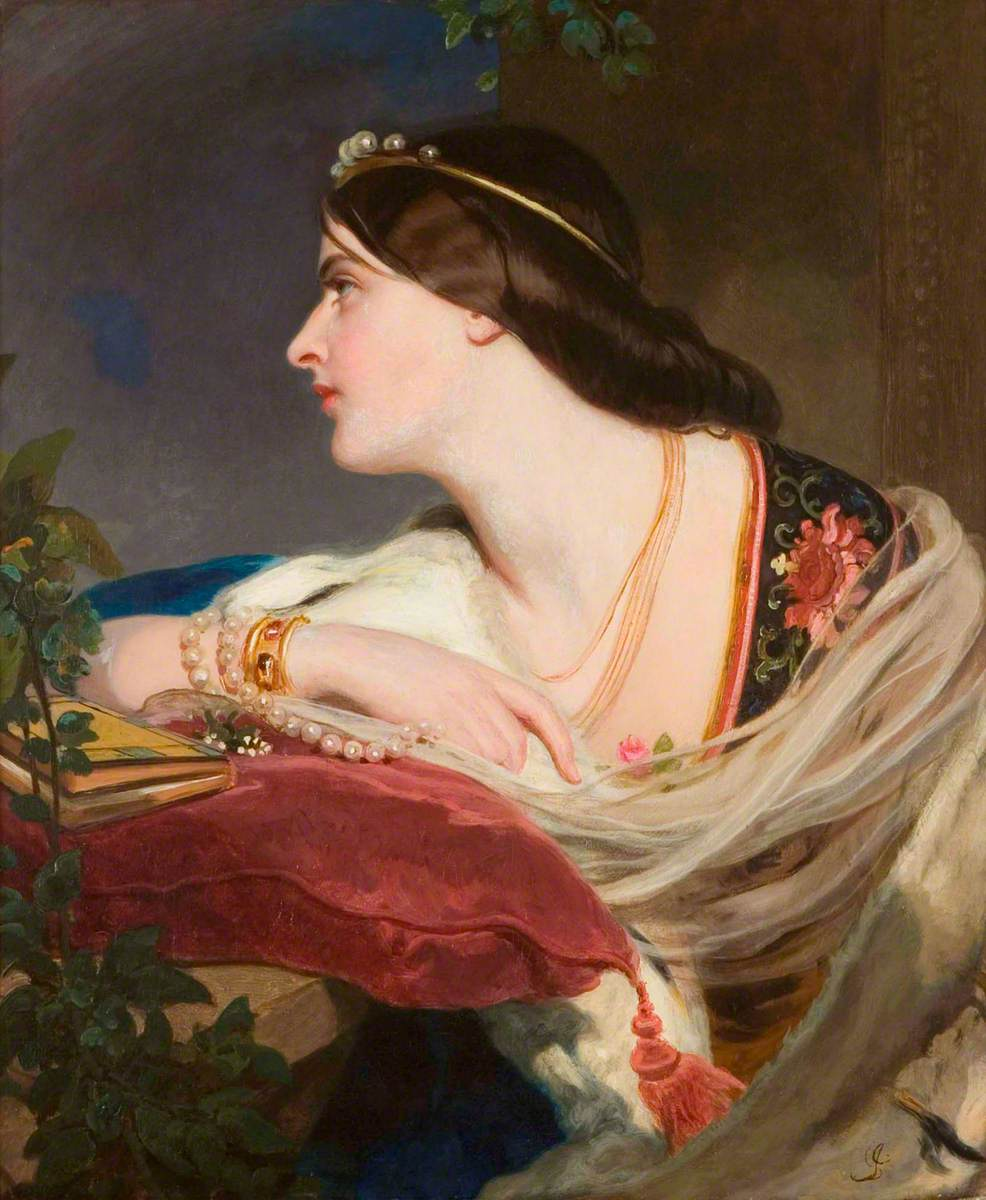
The Bride of Abydos
(Government Art Collection)

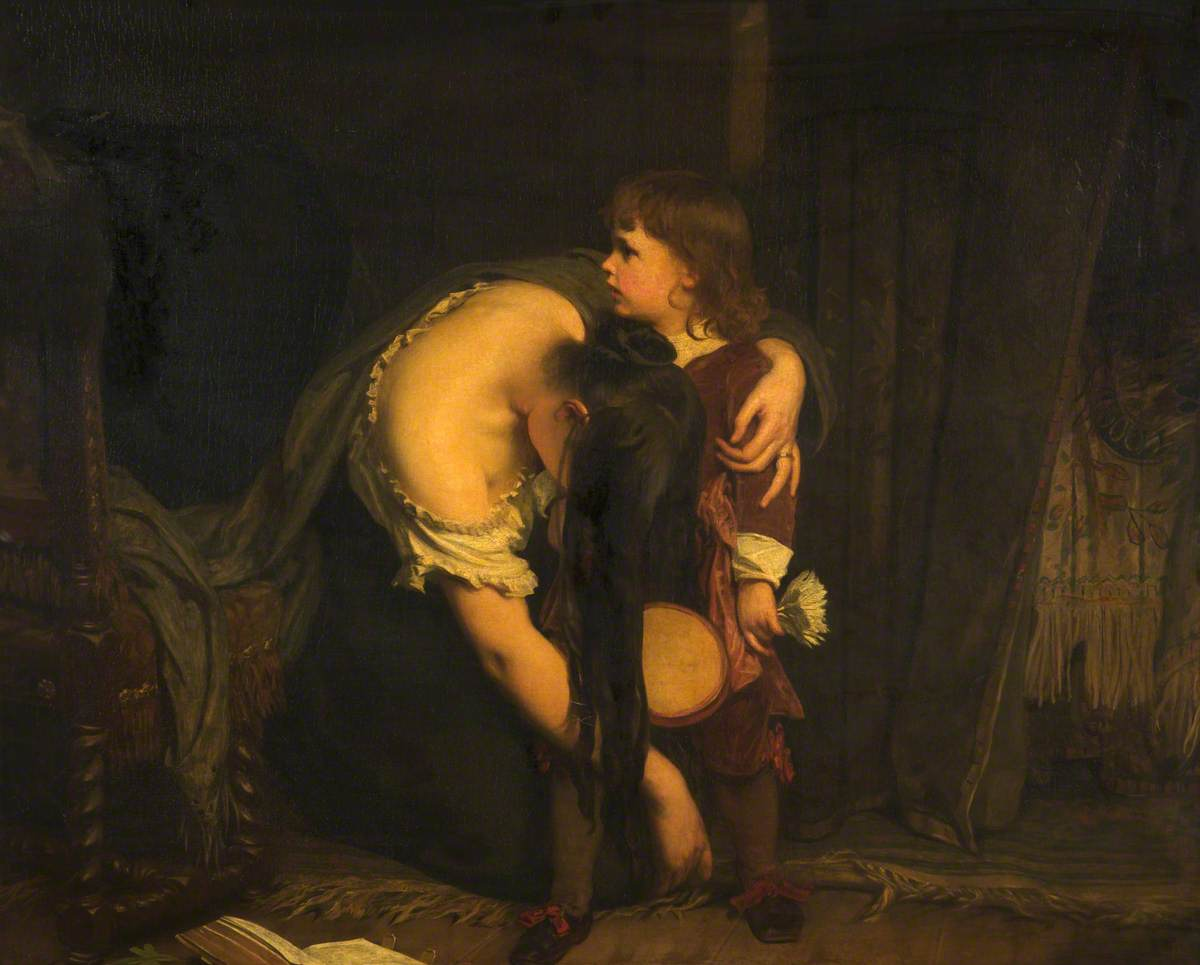
The First Sense of Sorrow, 1862
(Touchstones Rochdale)

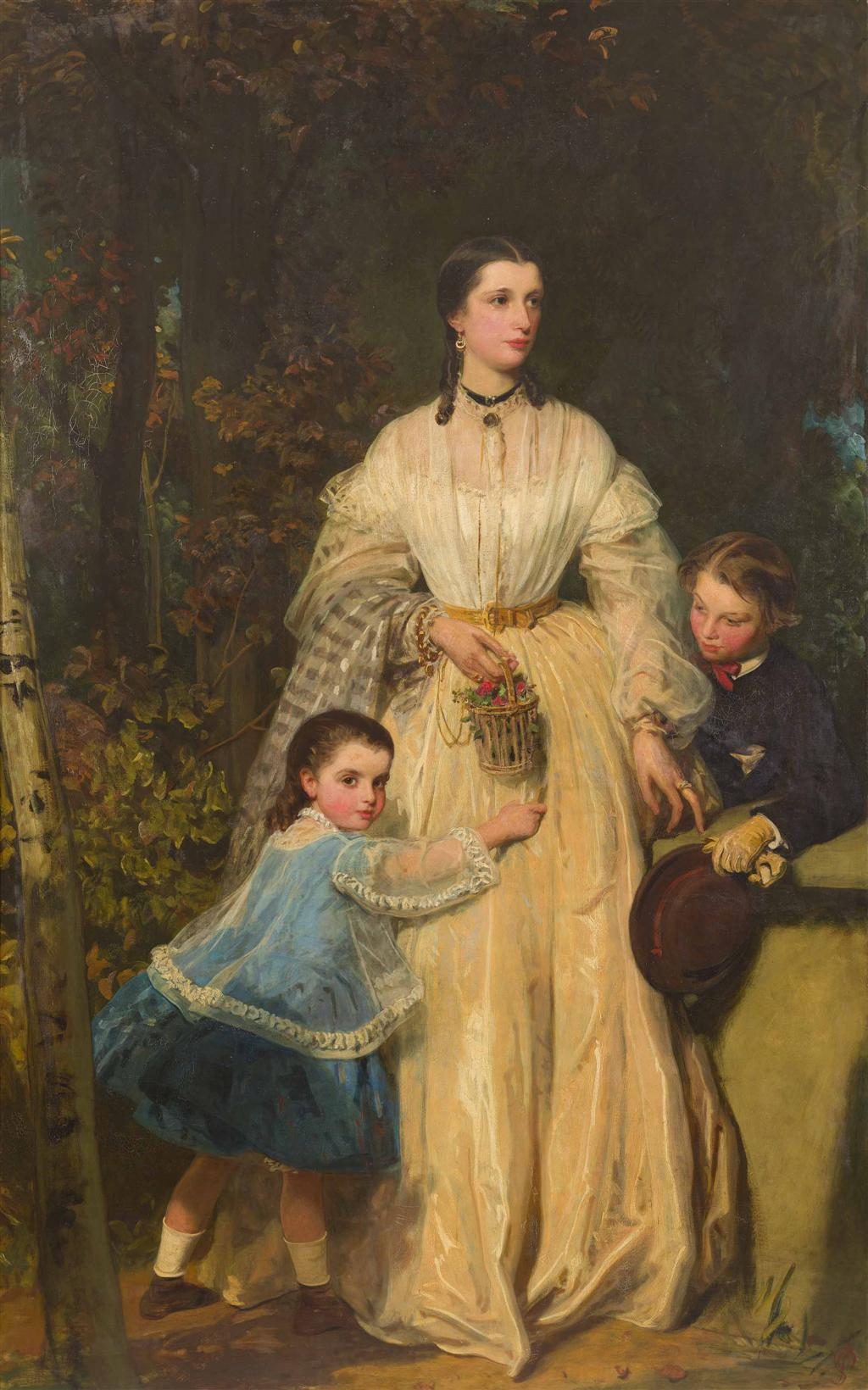
Mary Fothergill and her children Richard and Mary of Lowbridge House, c.1864 (Exhibited: Royal Academy 1864)

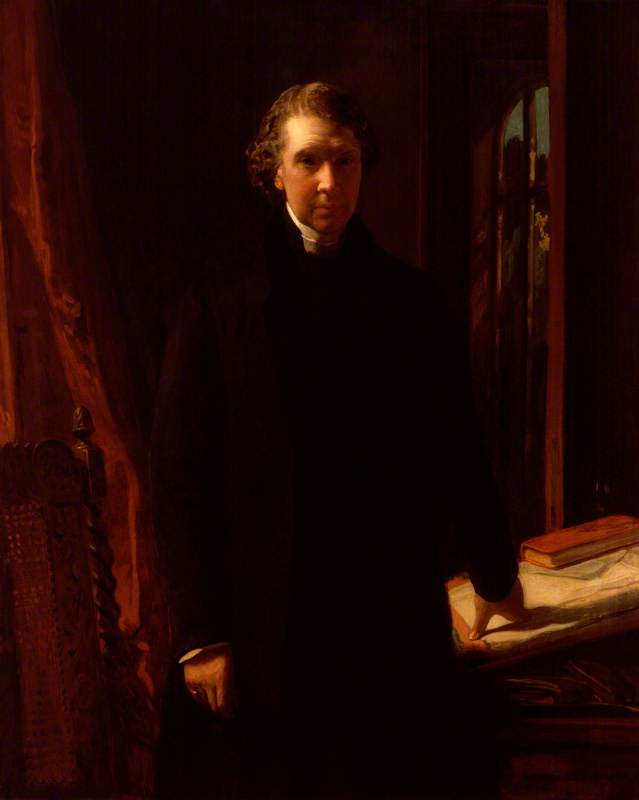
Archibald Campbell Tait, Archbishop of Canterbury, c.1865
(National Portrait Gallery, London)

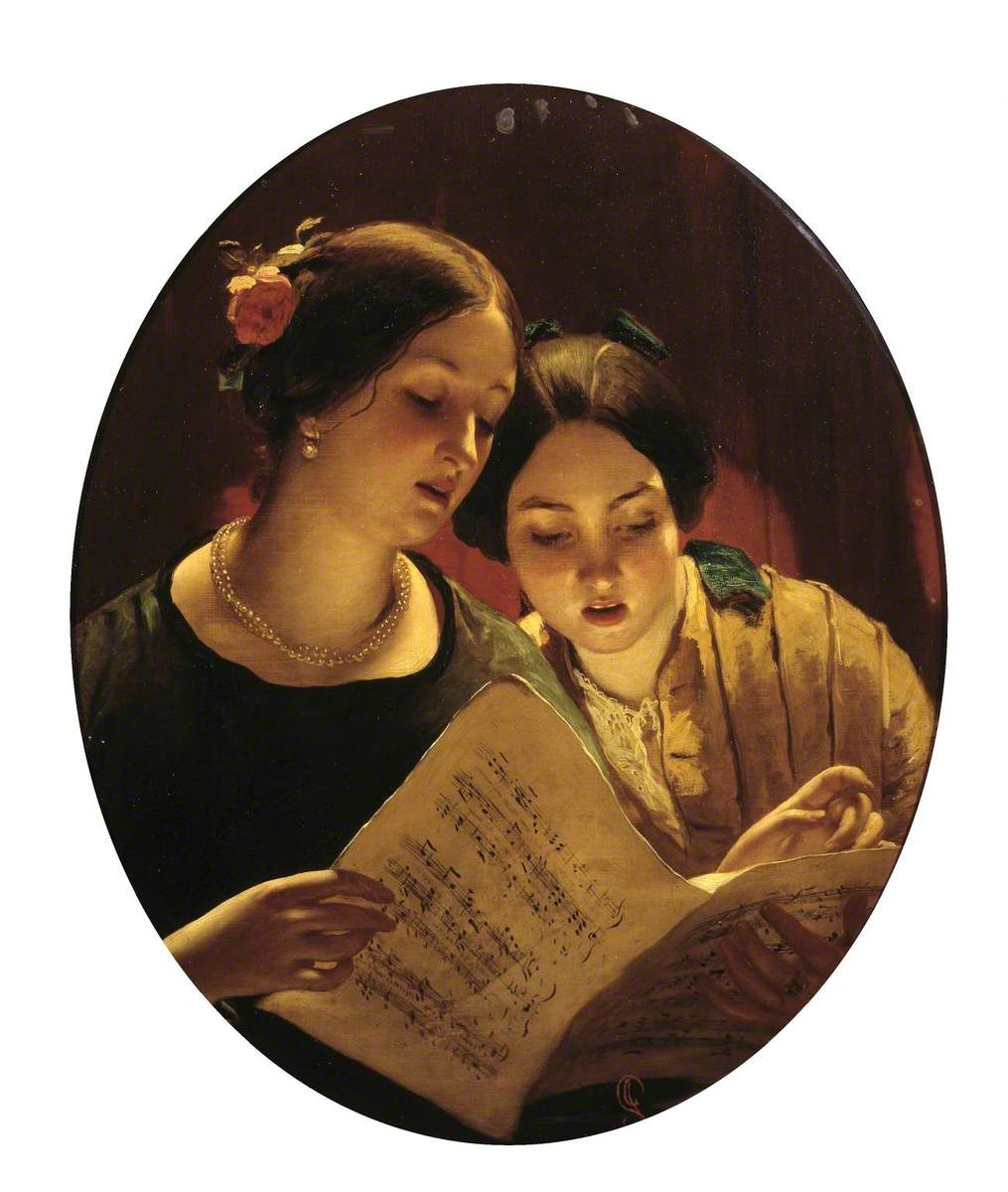
The Duet
(Tate Britain)

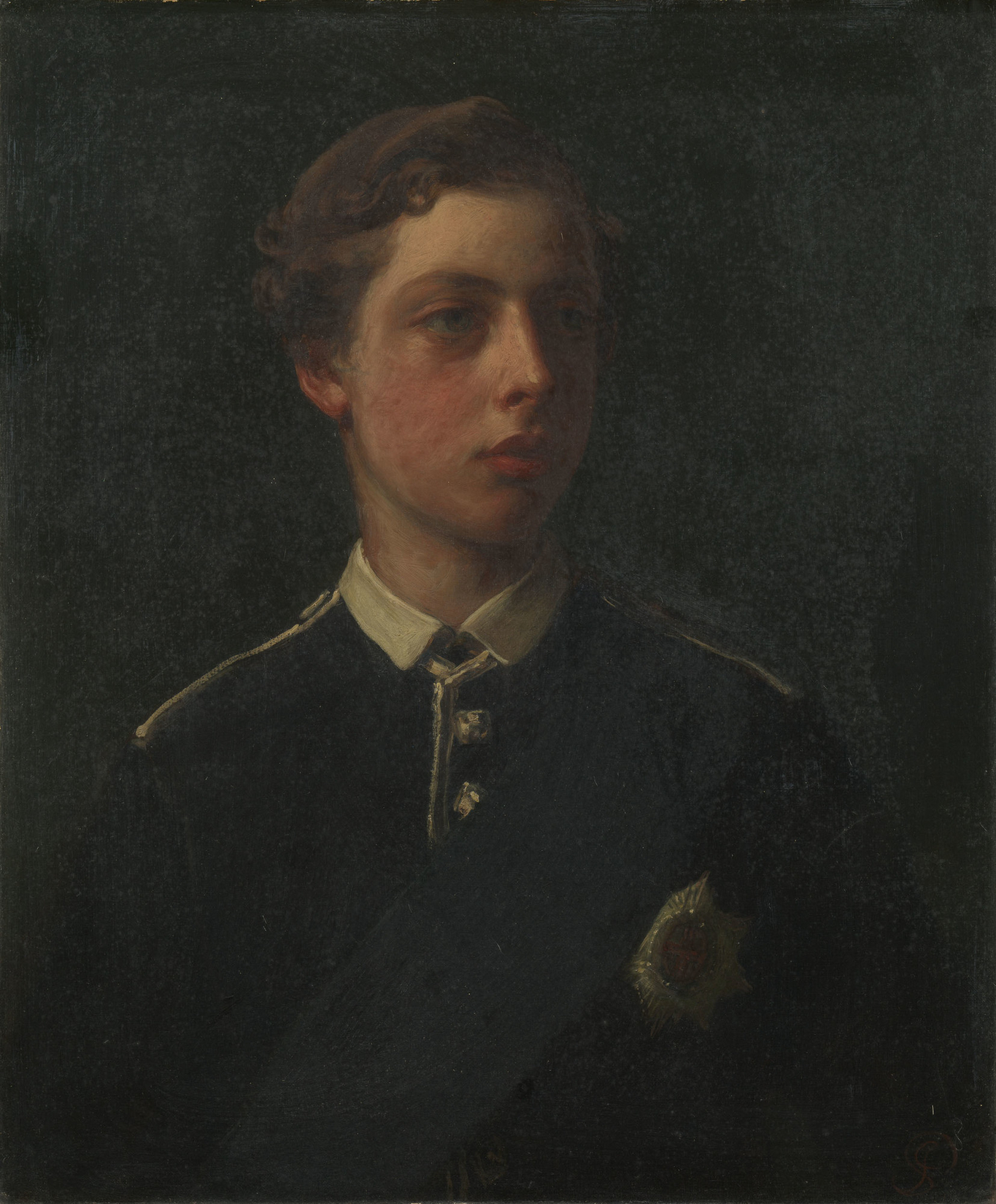
Prince Leopold, 1869
(Royal Collection)

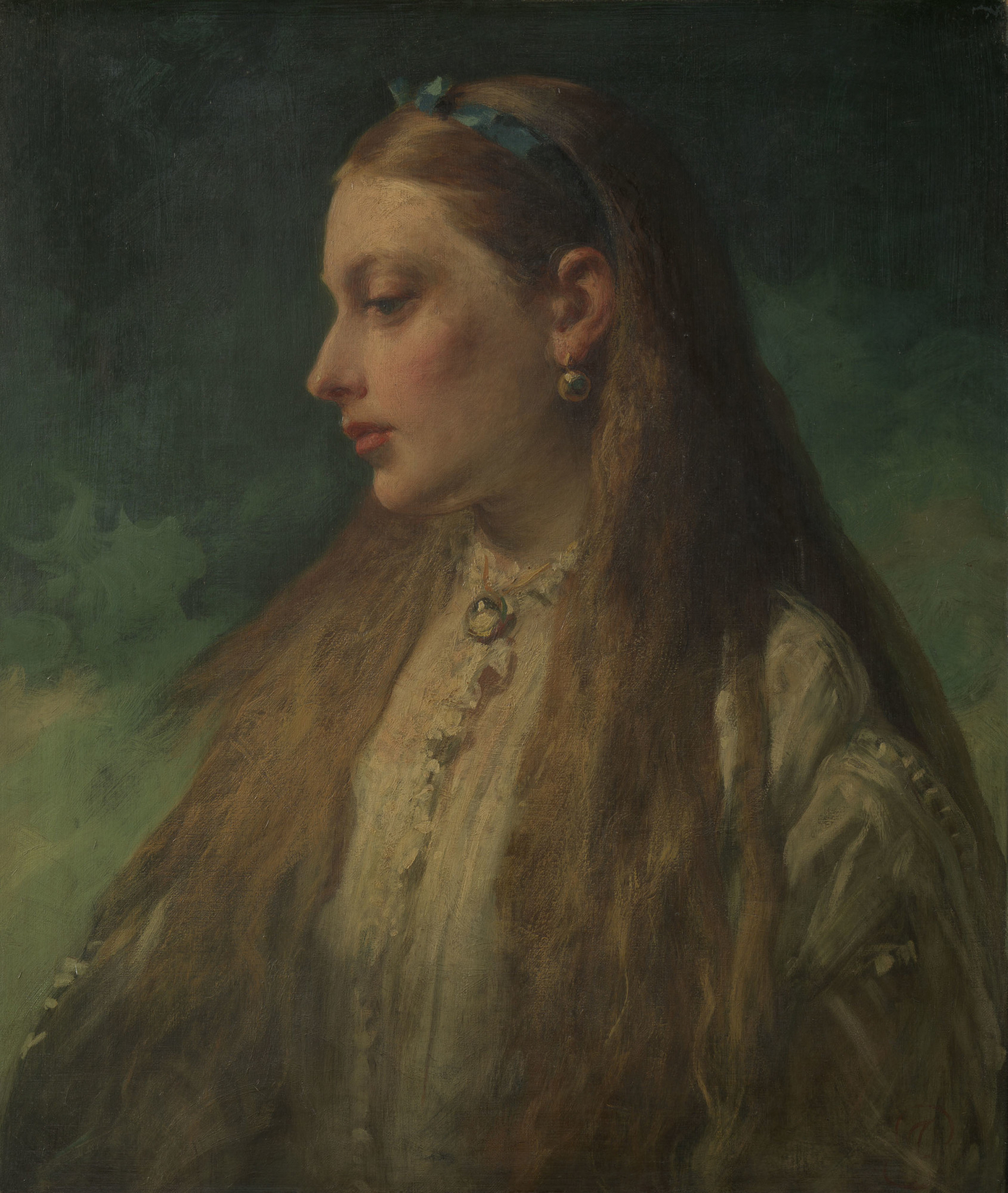
Princess Beatrice, later Princess Henry of Battenberg, 1869
(Royal Collection)

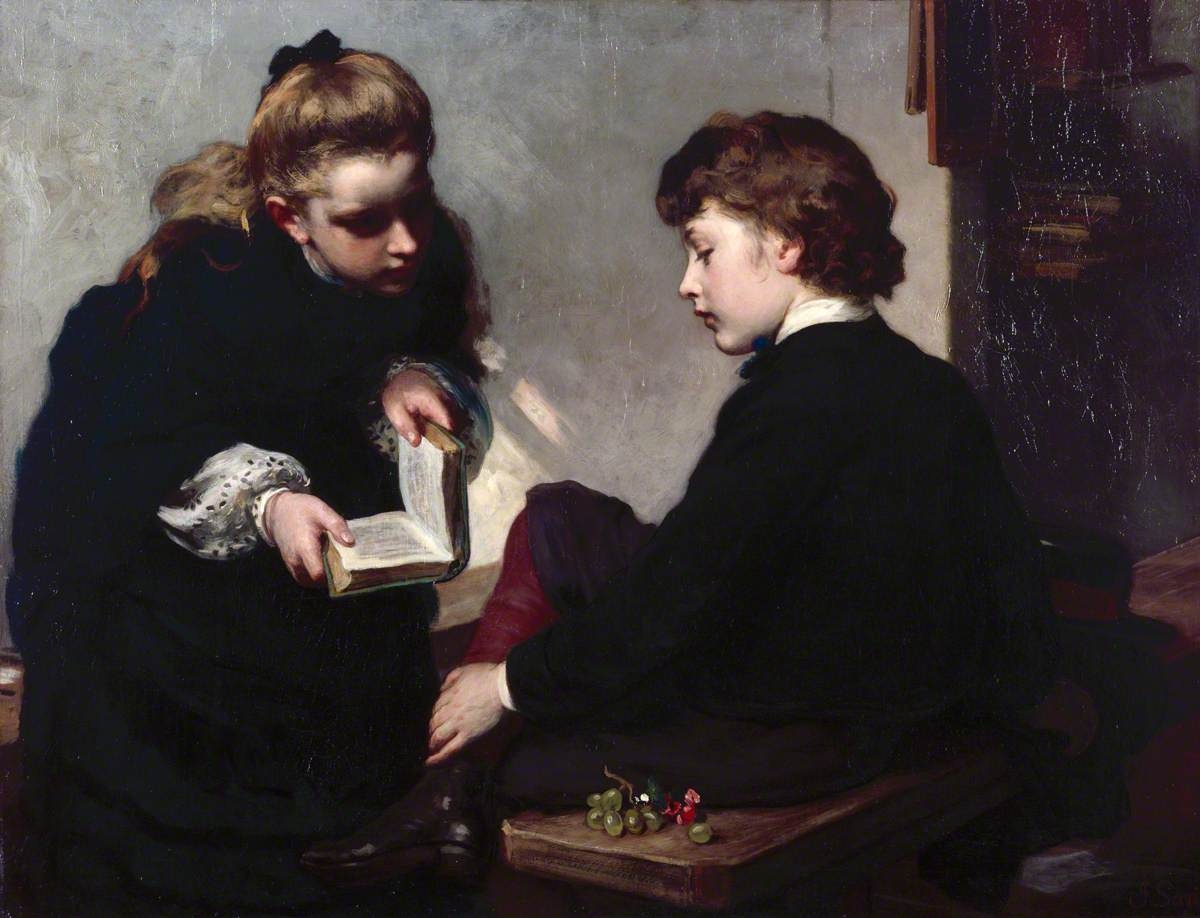
The Schoolmaster's Daughter , 1870
(Royal Academy)

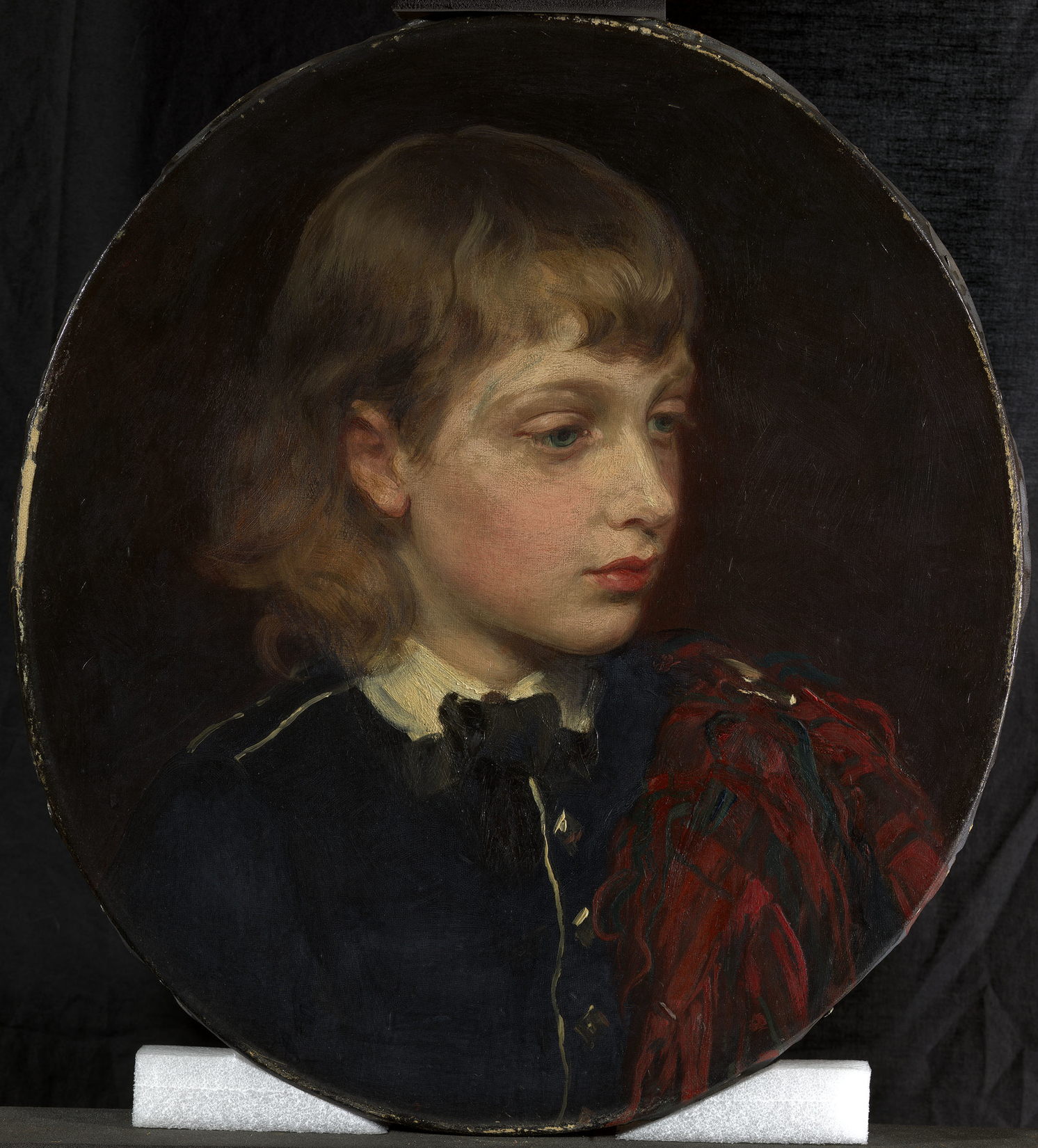
Prince Albert Victor of Wales, 1871
(Royal Collection)

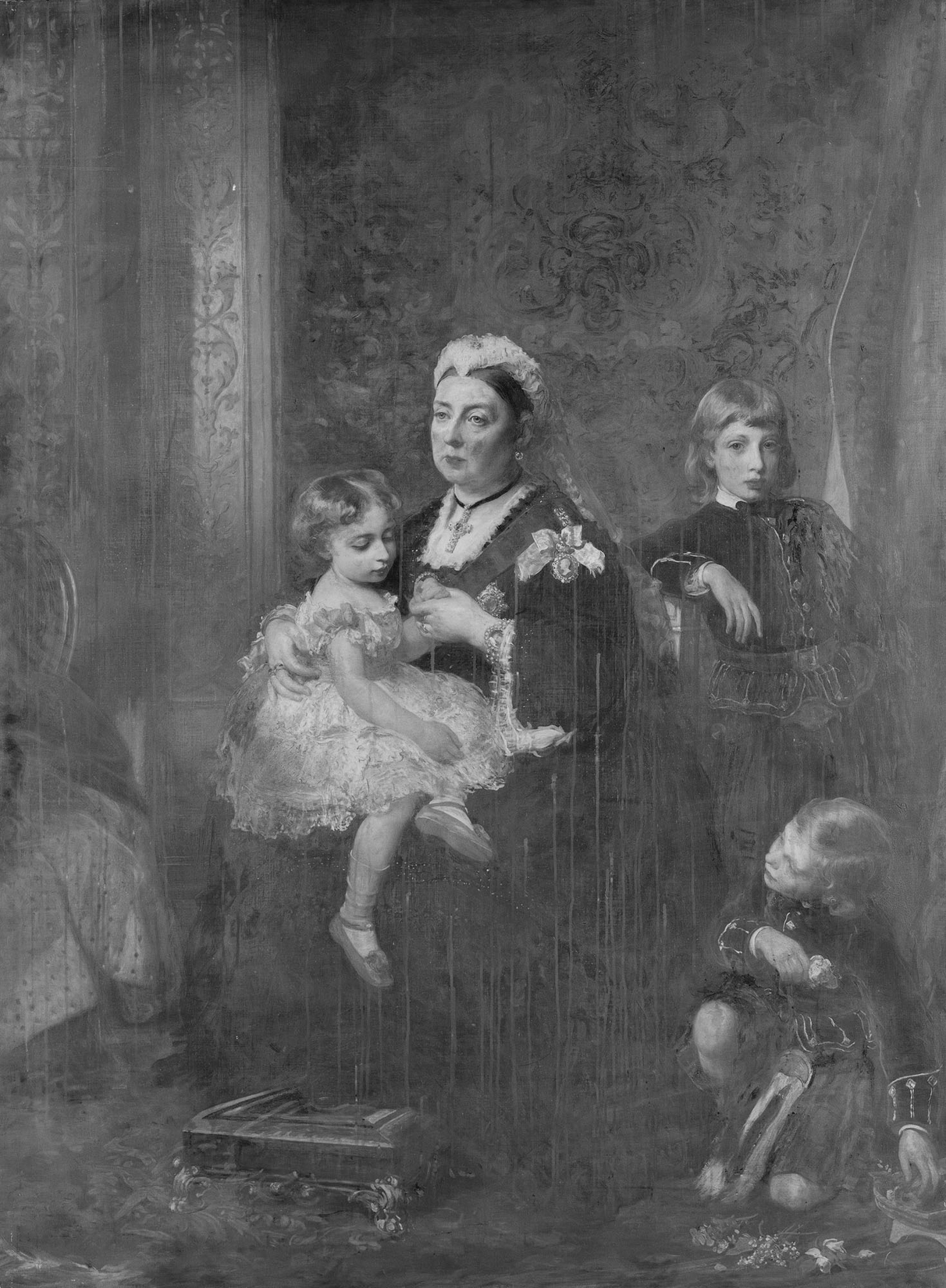
Queen Victoria with three grandchildren, 1872
(Royal Collection)

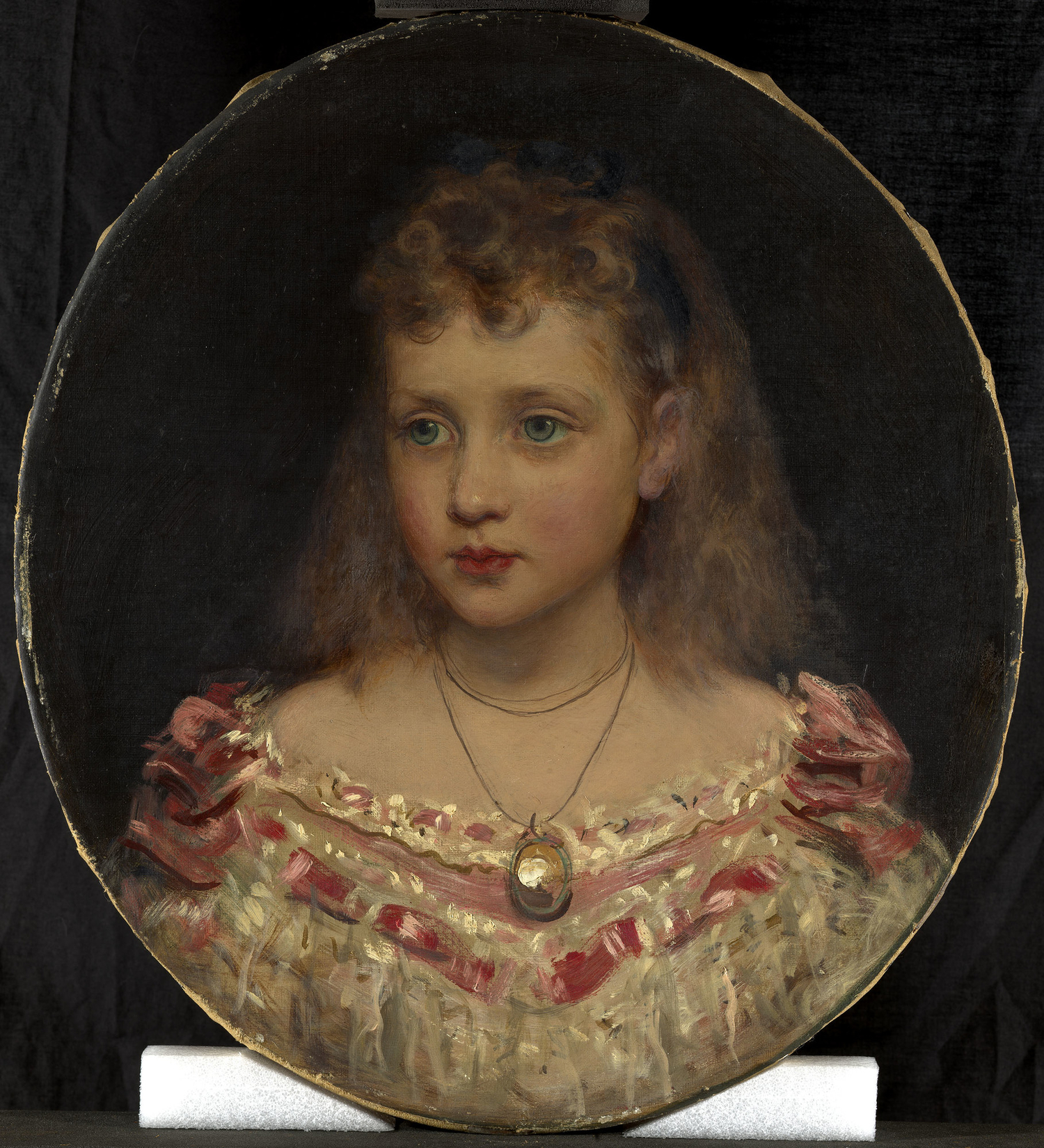
Princess Louise of Wales, 1872
(Royal Collection)

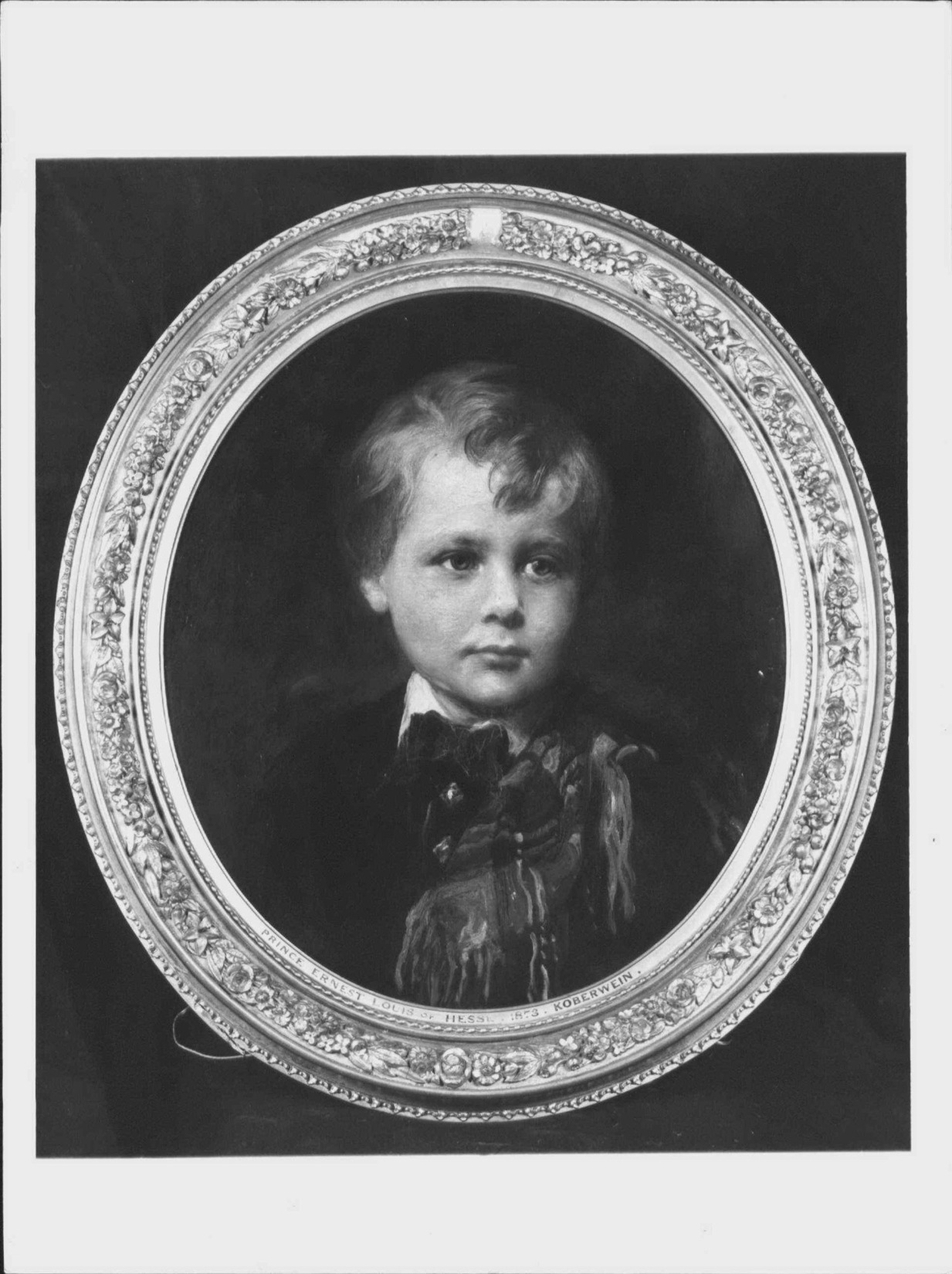
Prince Ernest of Hesse, c.1872
(Royal Collection)

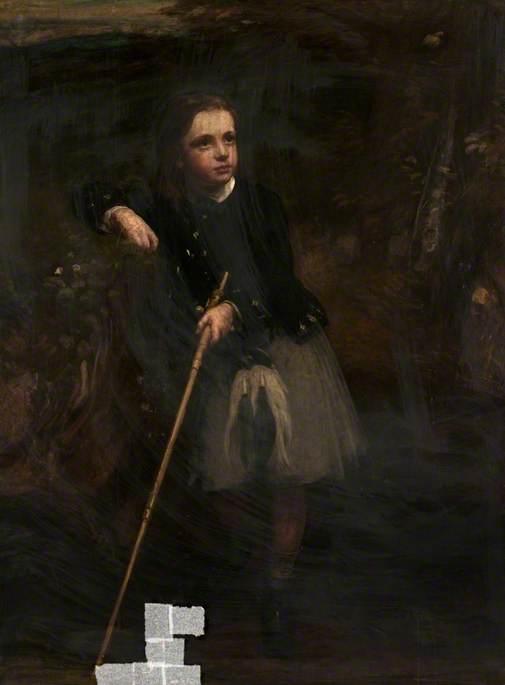
Major Dennistoun as a Boy, 1873
(Glasgow Museums)

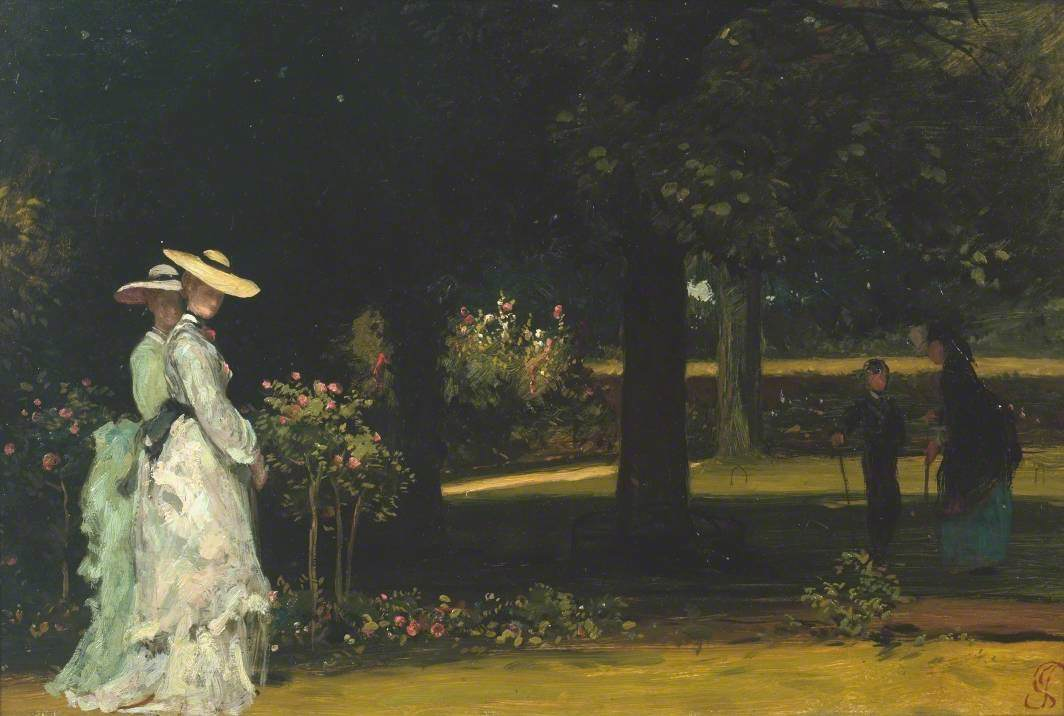
Miss Martineau's Garden, 1873
(Tate Britain)

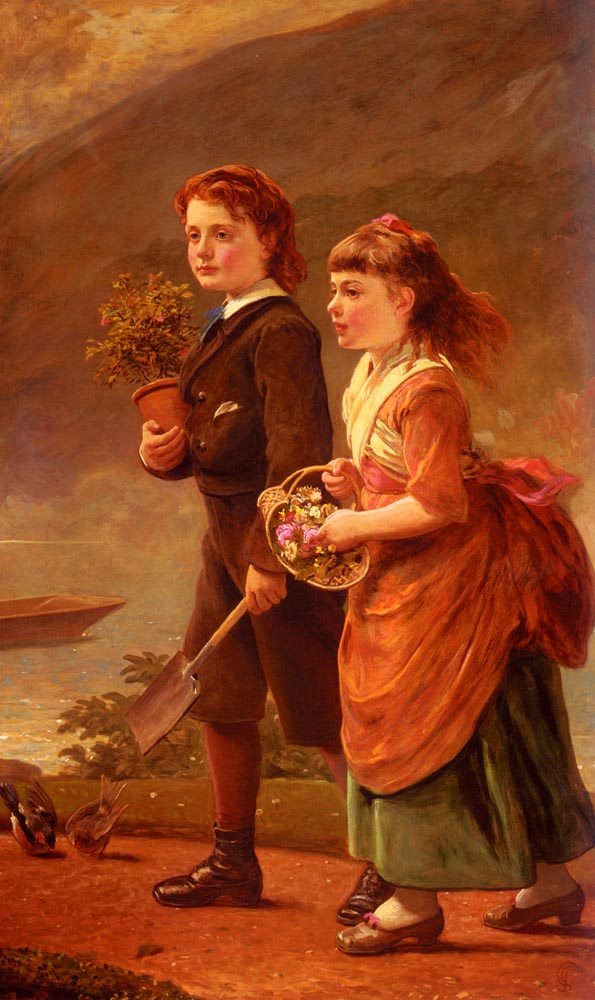
The Children of Major Barrett, of Moredon, Taunton, 1875

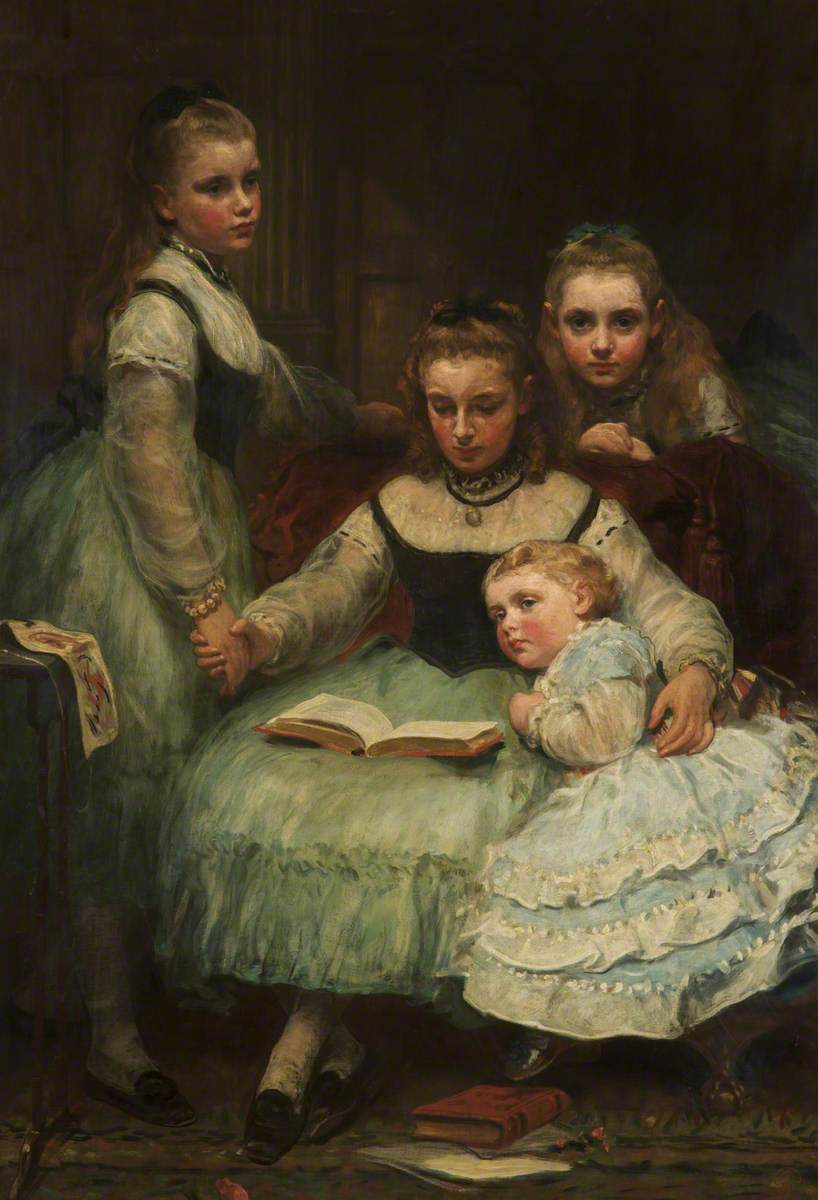
The Walker Sisters, c.1875
(Bury Art Museum)

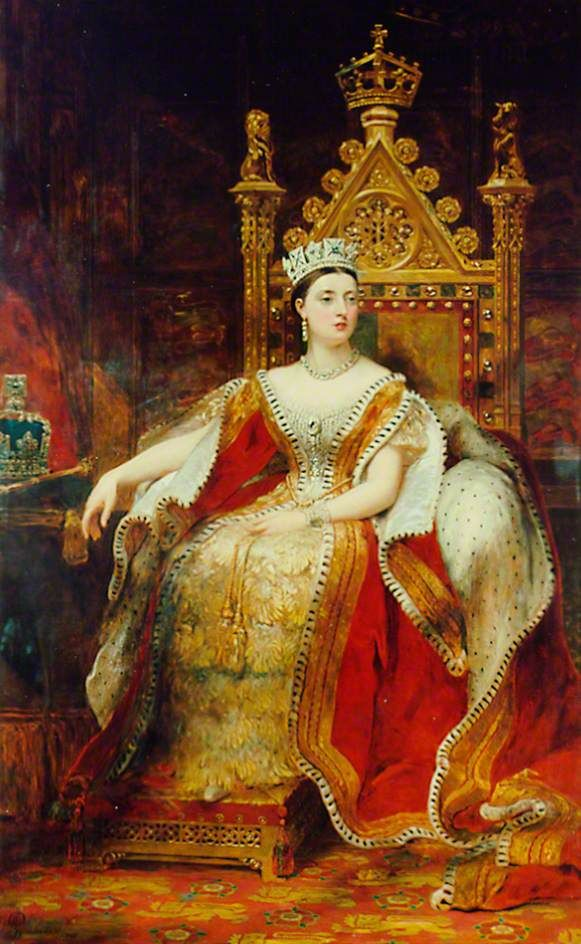
The Royal Portrait of H.M. Queen Victoria, 1876
(Palace of Westminster)

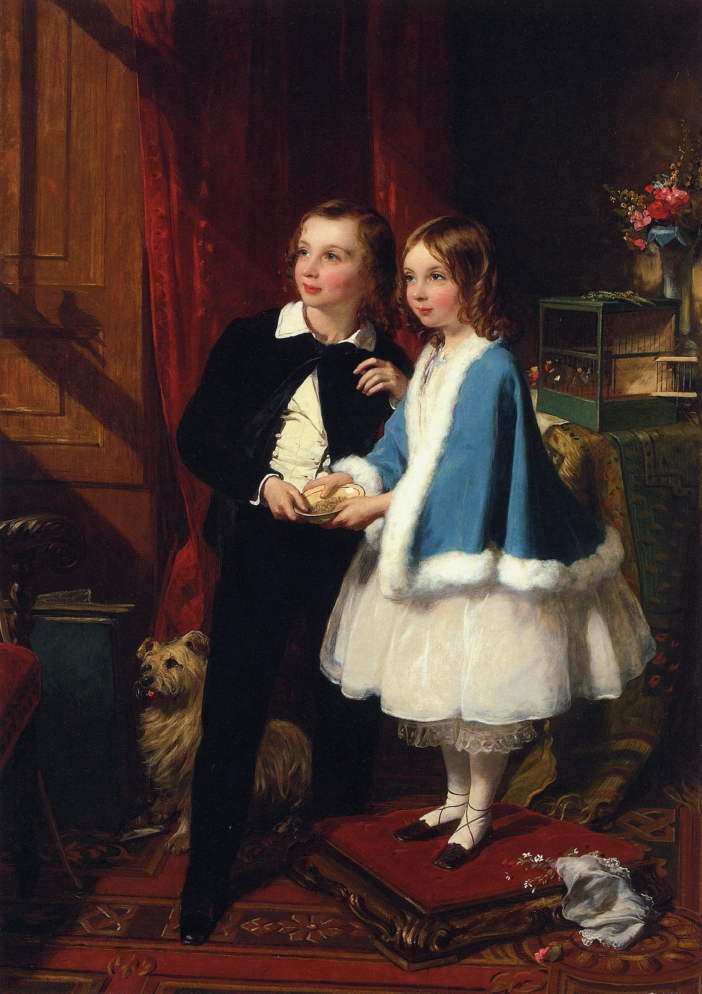
Lord Almeric Athelstan and Lady Clementina, the Children of George Spencer-Churchill, 6th Duke of Marlborough, 1876

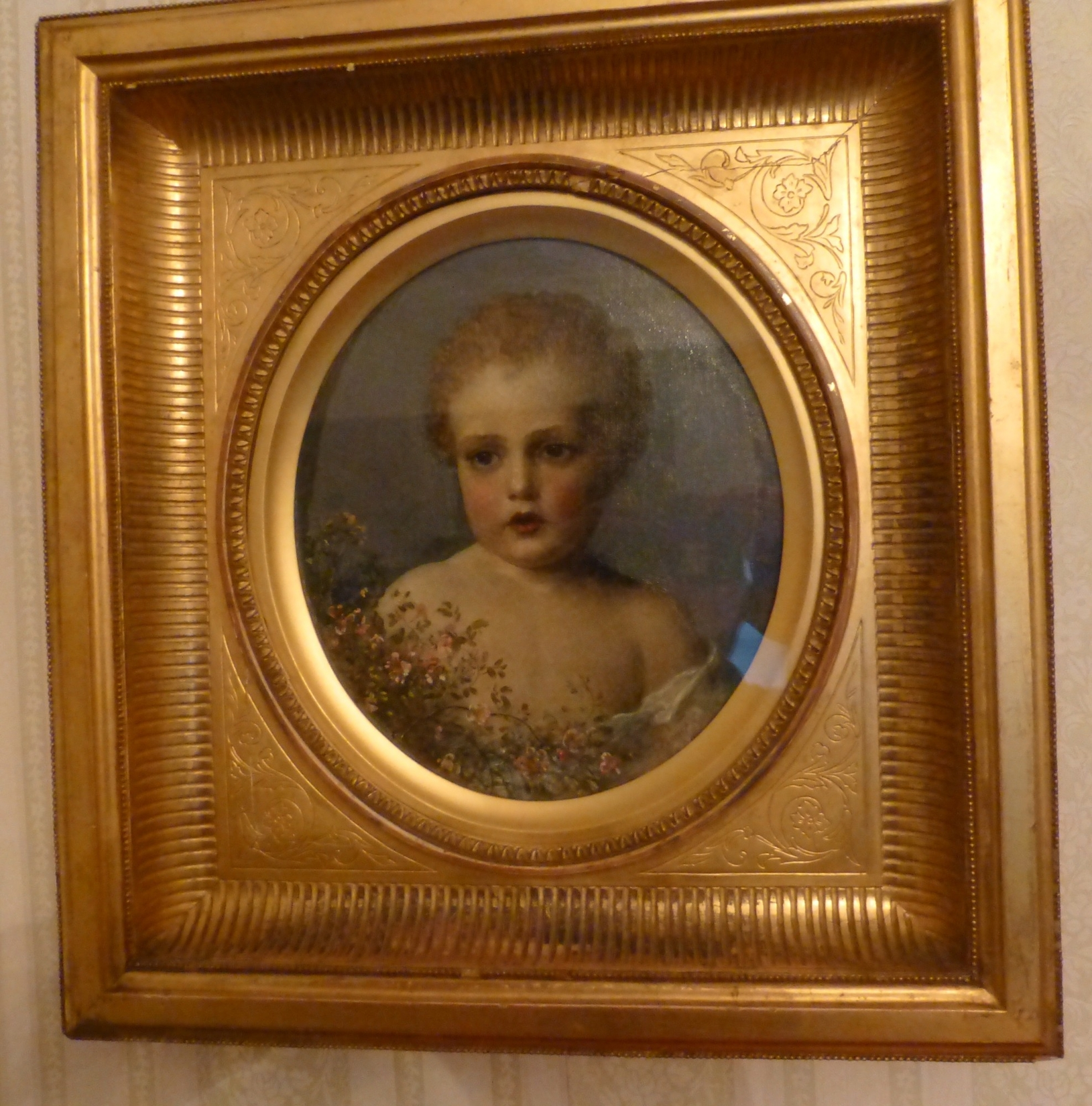
A Young Child
(Royal Collection)

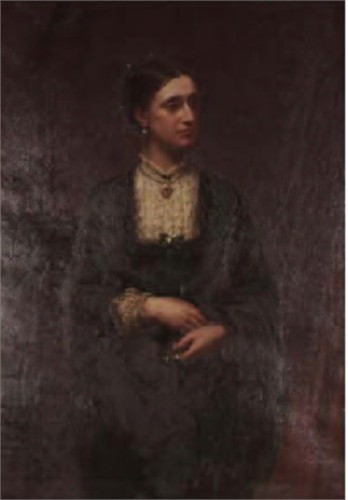
Lady Frances Bushby, née Lady Frances North, daughter of Francis North, 6th Earl of Guilford, 1879

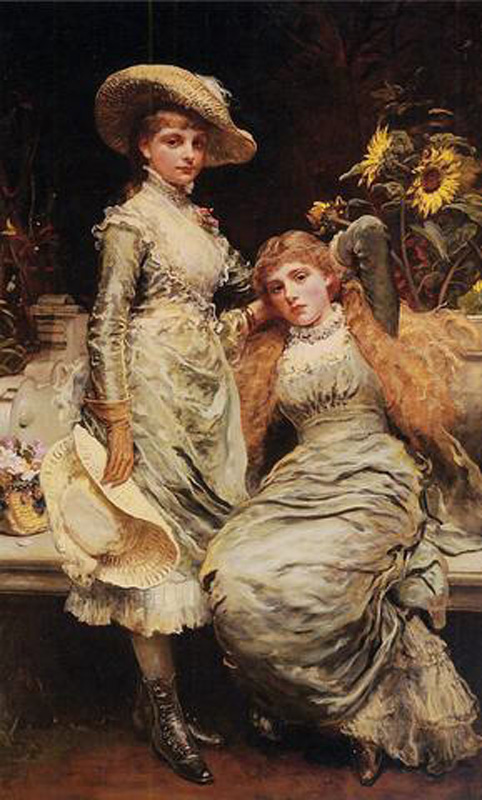
Lady Susannah Holford (then Susannah Wilson)(right) and her sister Ethel, 1880 (Royal Academy Exhibition of 1881)

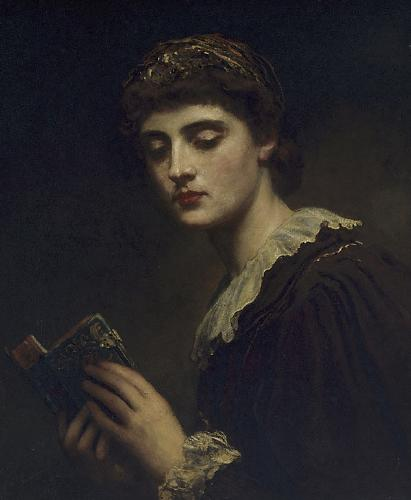
Lesbia, c.1881
(Art Gallery of New South Wales)

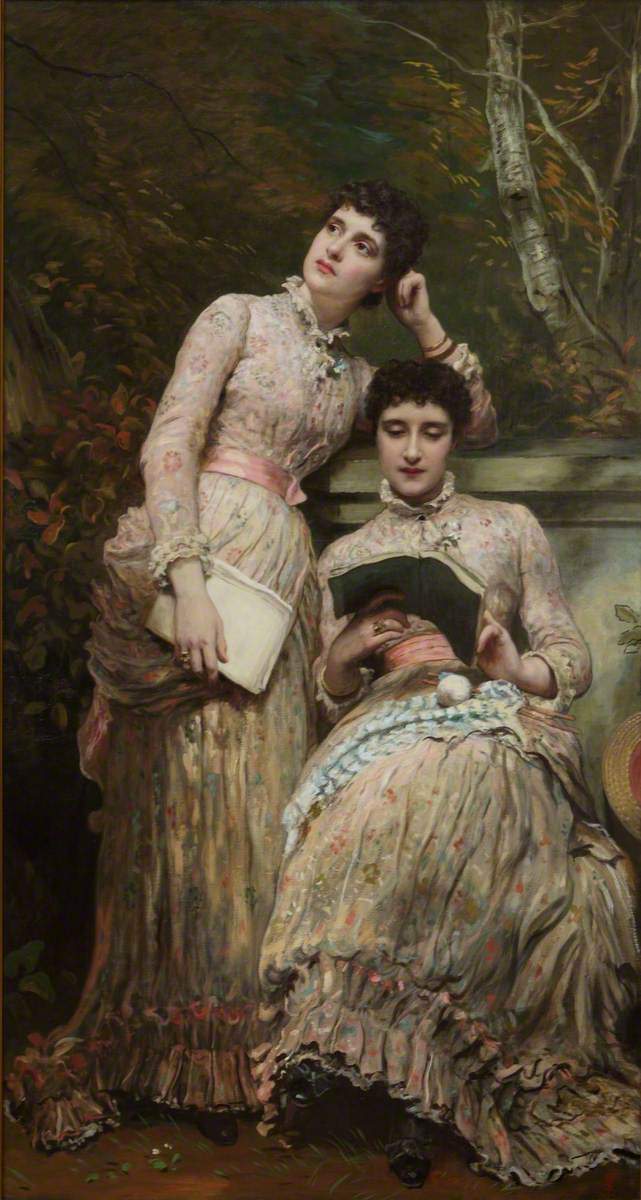
Ida and Ethel, Twin Daughters of J. Searlight, Esq., 1884
(Russell-Cotes Art Gallery & Museum)

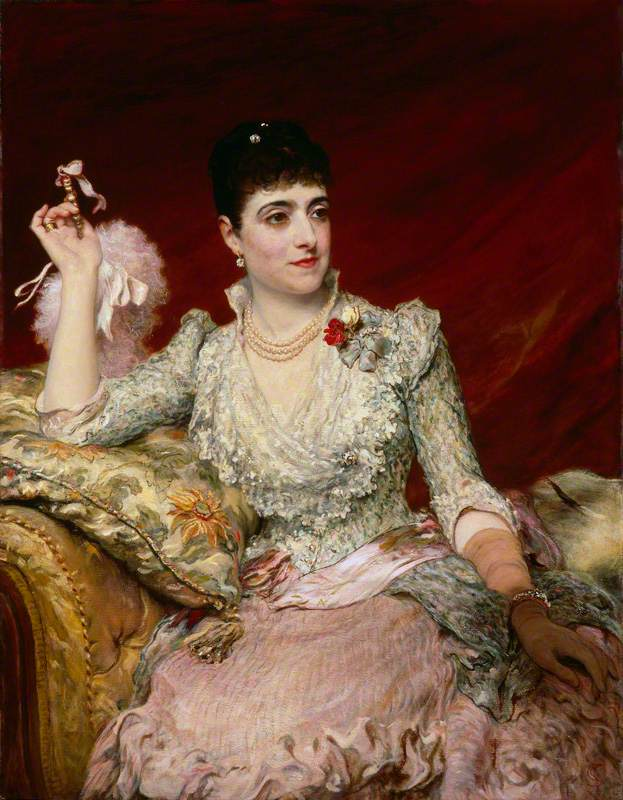
Madame Adeline Patti, 1886
(National Portrait Gallery)
On display at The Beaney House of Art & Knowledge, Canterbury

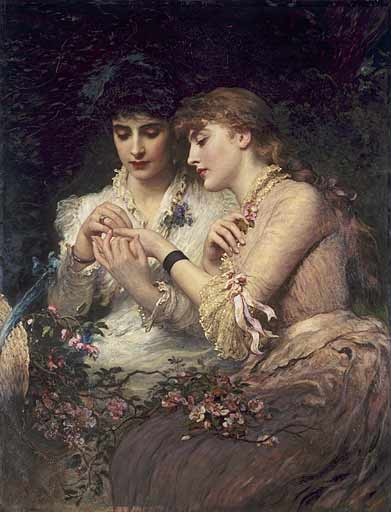
A Thorn Amidst the Roses, 1887
(Manchester Art Gallery)

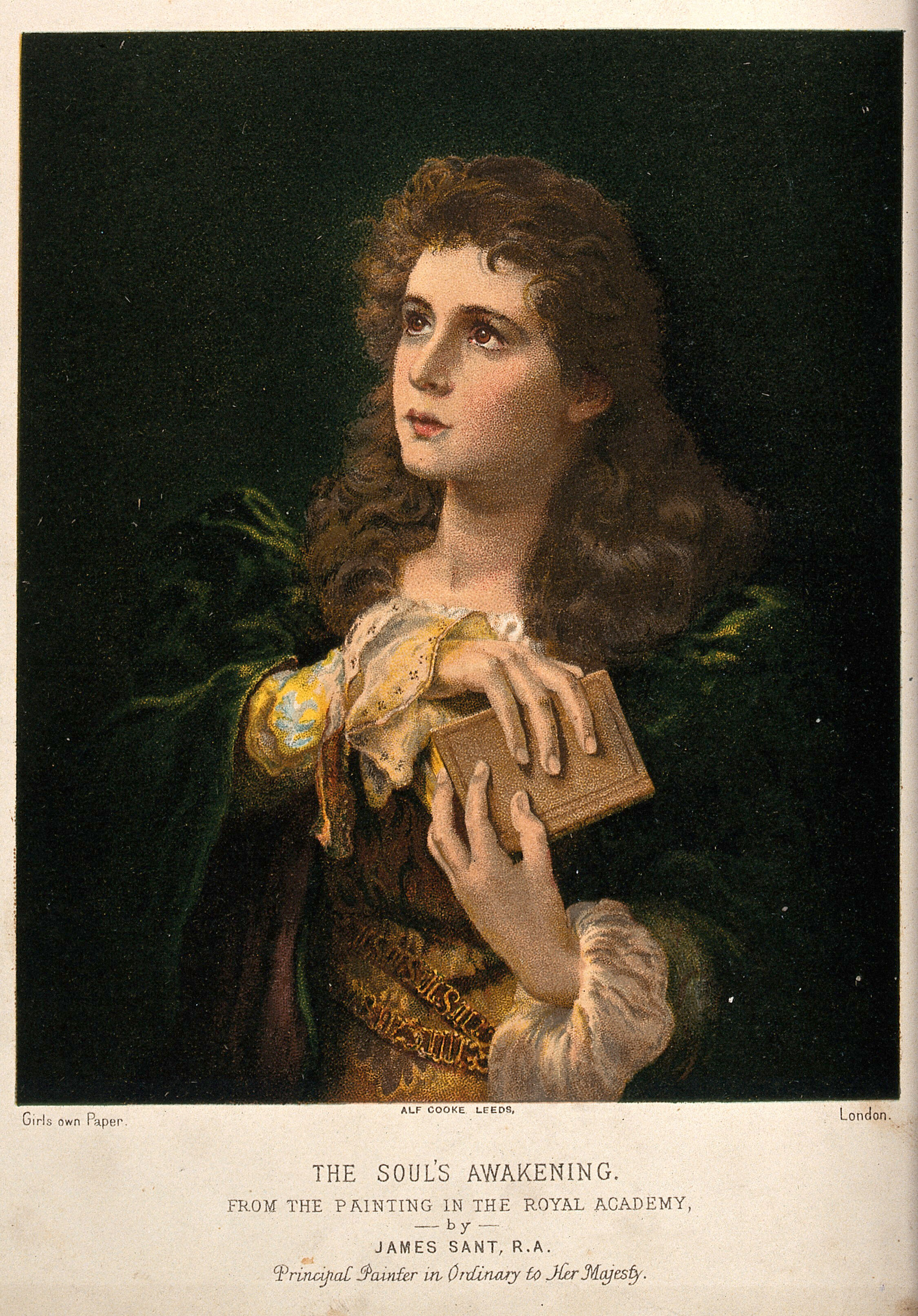
The Soul's Awakening, 1888
(Victoria & Albert Museum)

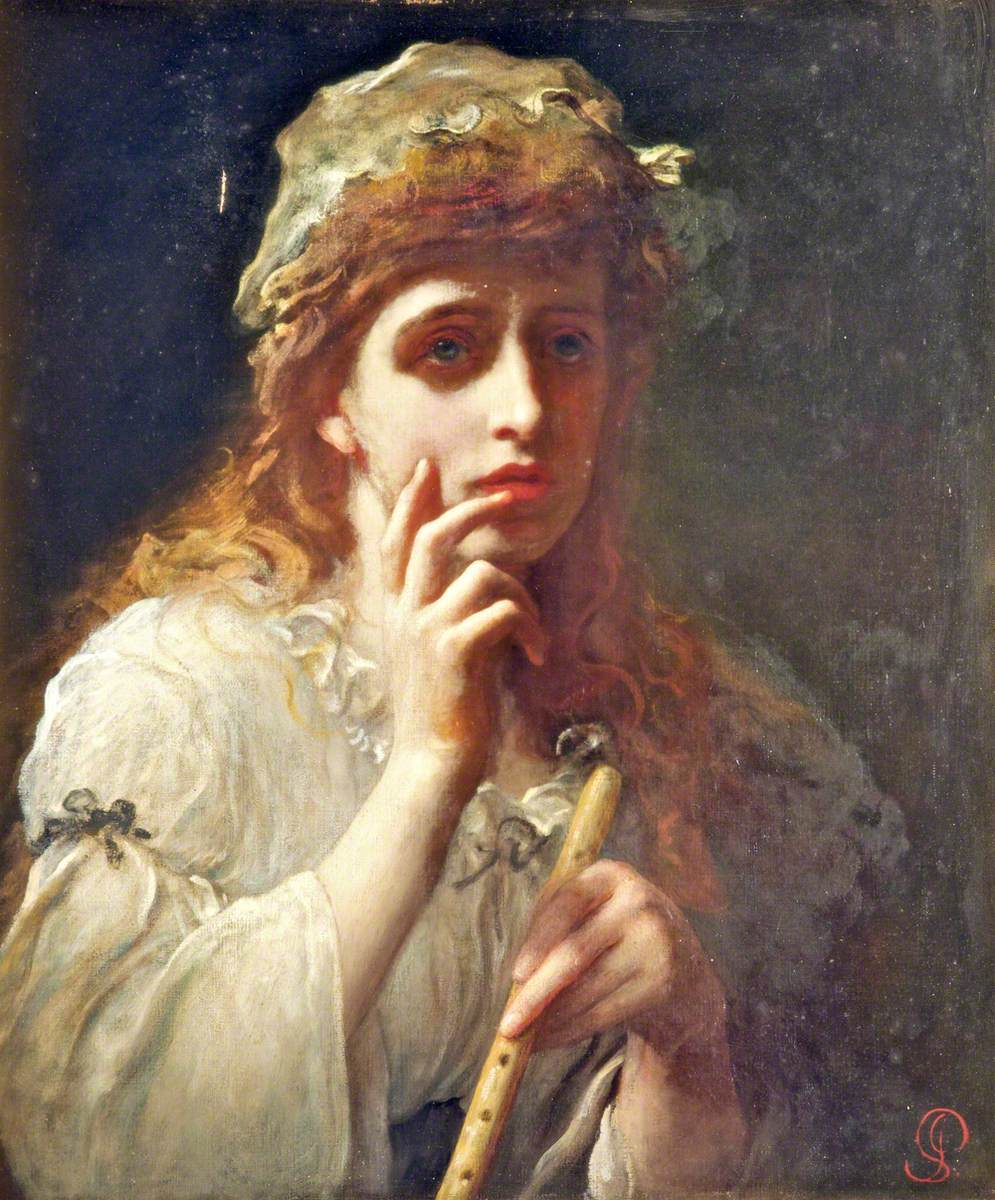
Sterne's Maria, c.1889 (Sudley House)

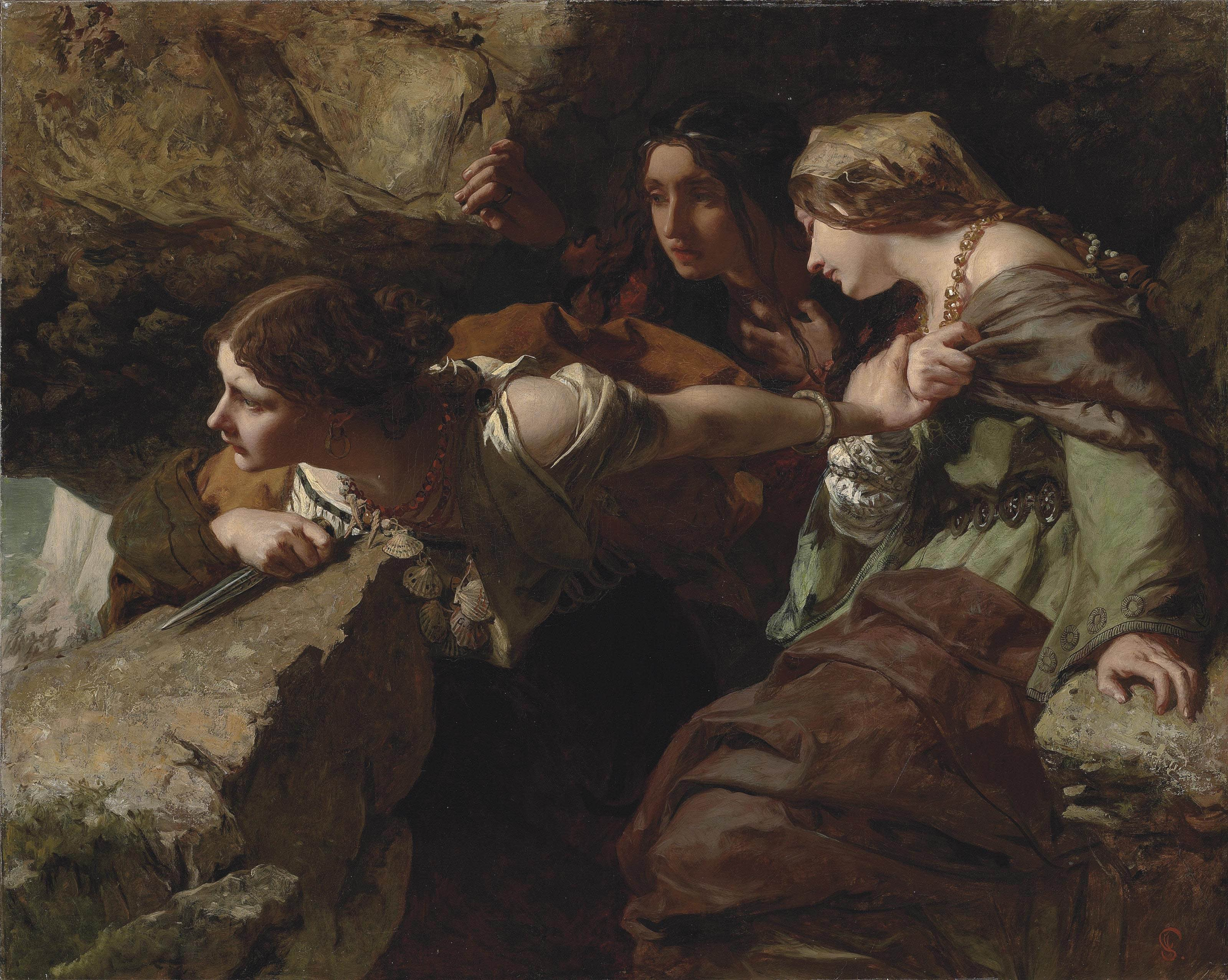
Courage, Anxiety and Despair: Watching the Battle
(Private Collection)

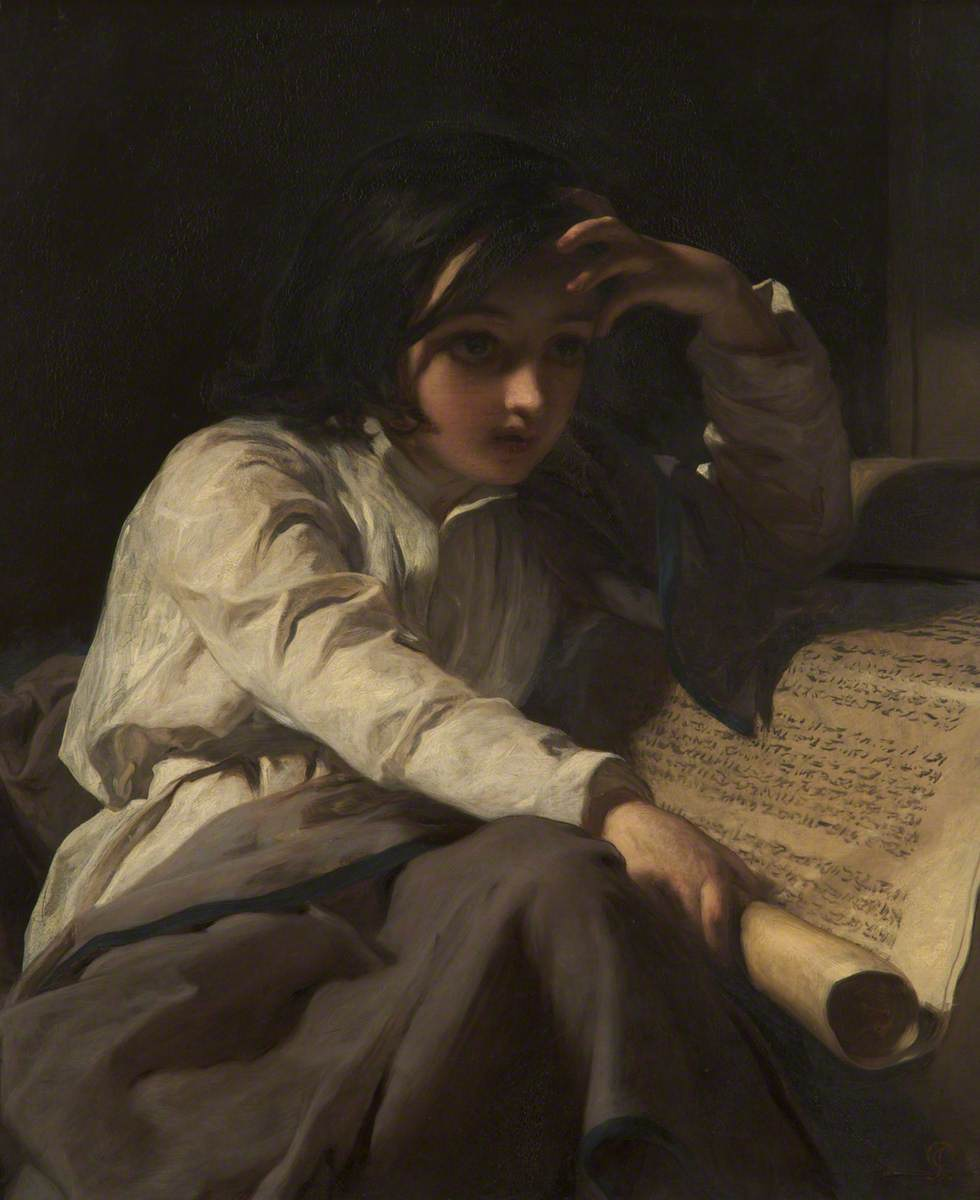
The Infant Timothy
(Bury Art Museum)

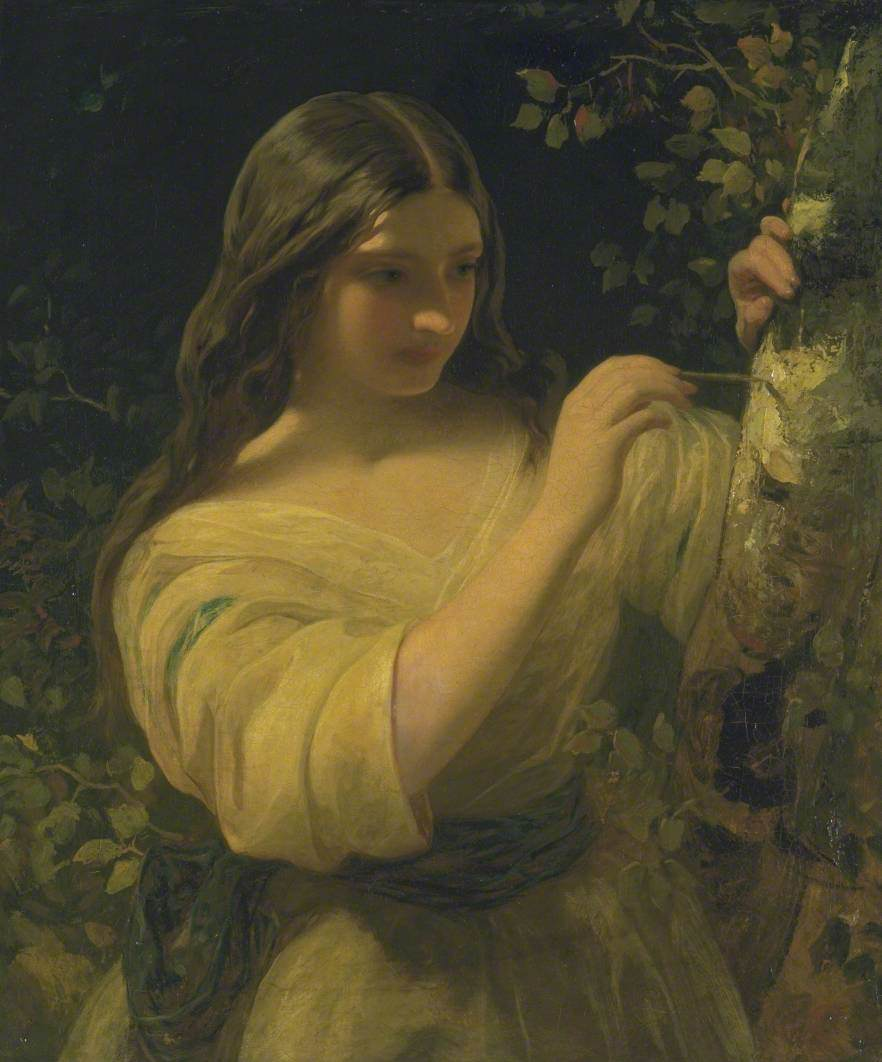
Rosalind
(Tate Britain)

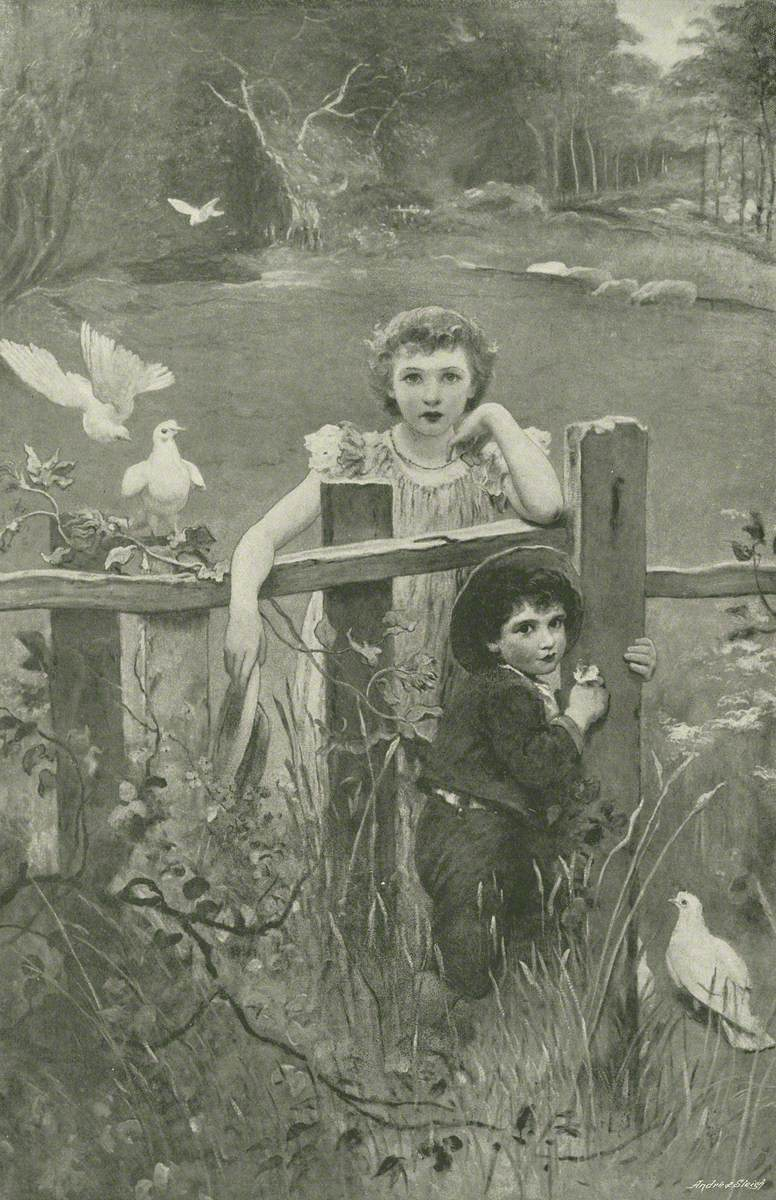
A Pastoral, 1892
(Royal Academy)

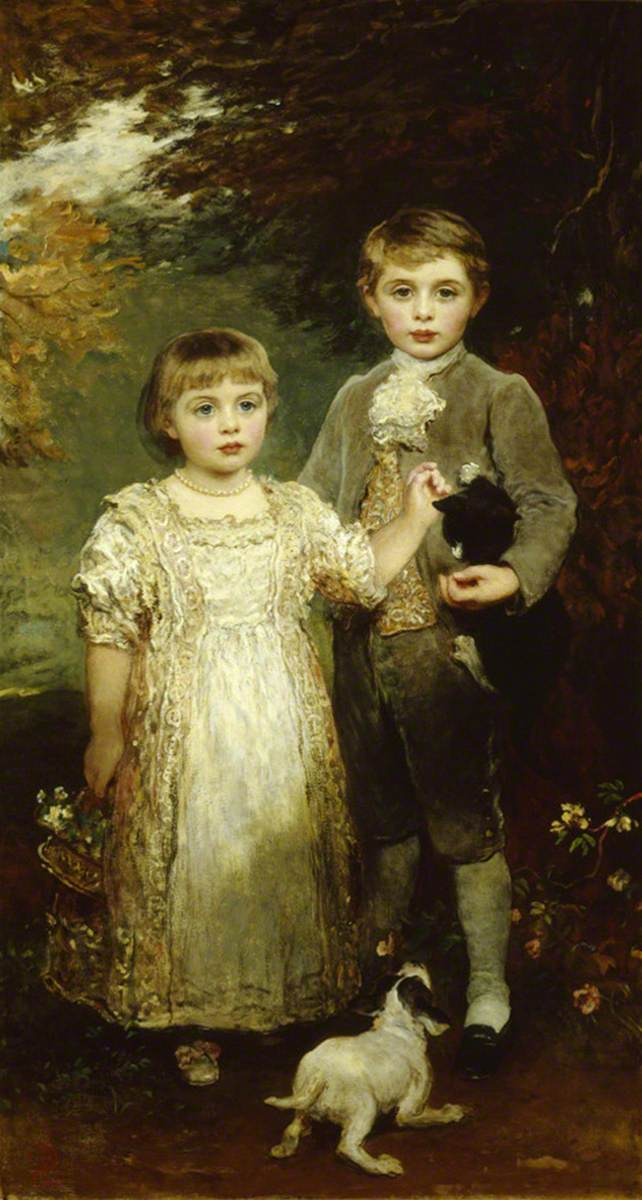
Arthur Agar-Robartes, 8th Viscount Clifden with his sister Edith, 1893 (National Trust)

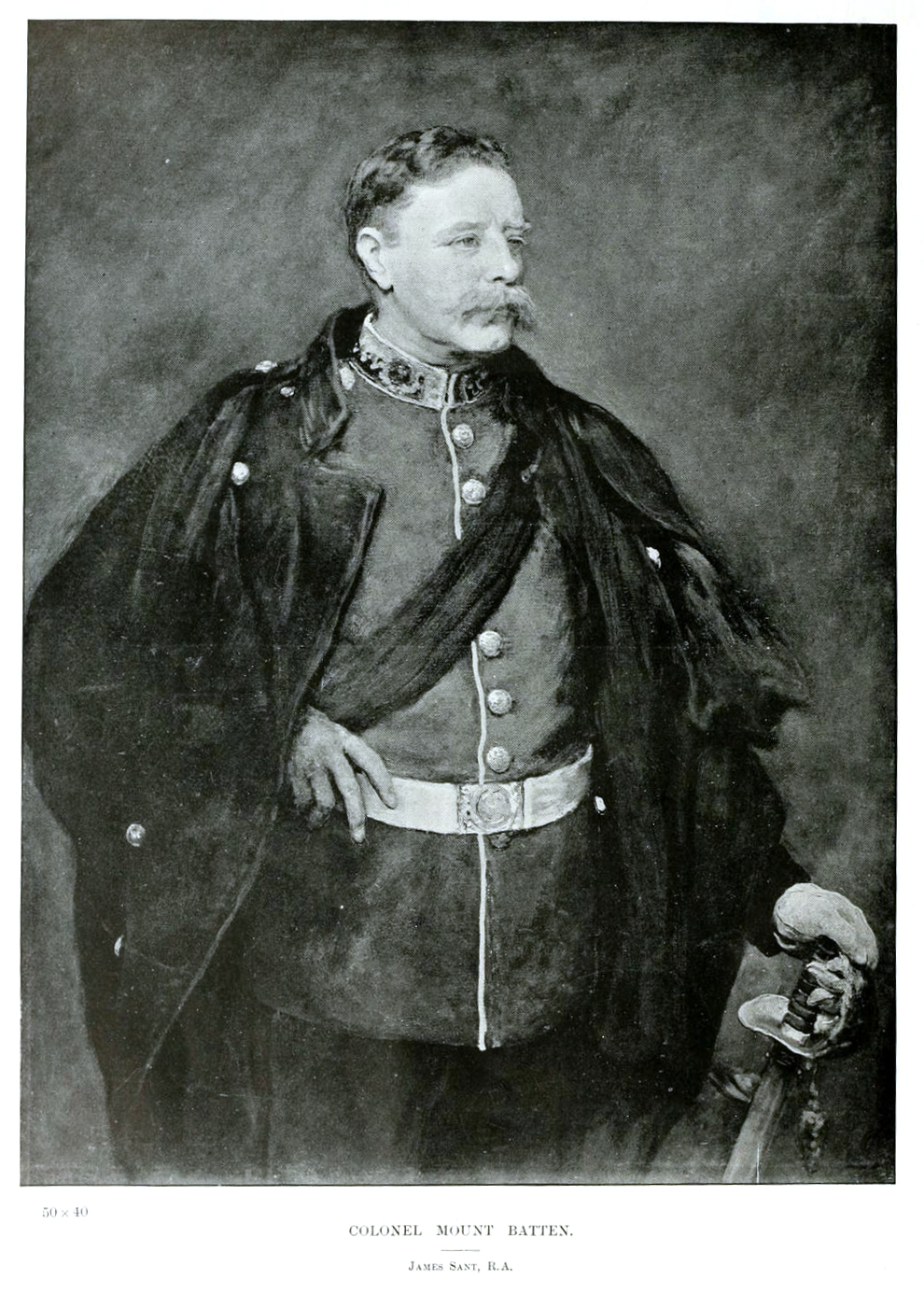
Colonel Batten, C.B.
c.1895

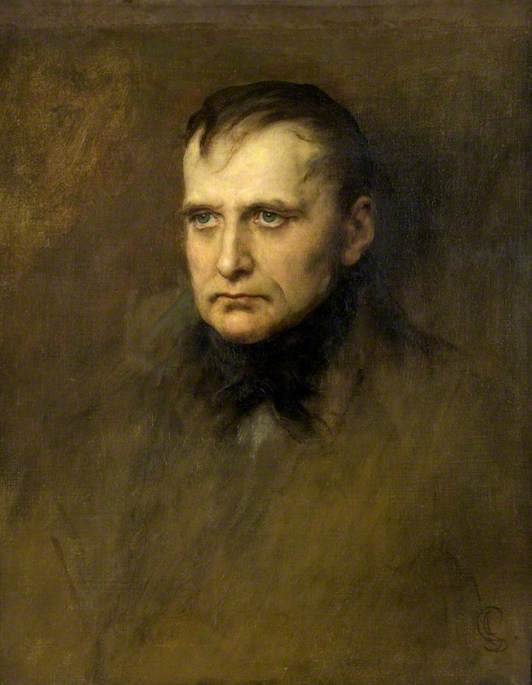
St. Helena: The Last Phase; commissioned by Lord Rosebery, c.1895 (Glasgow Museums)

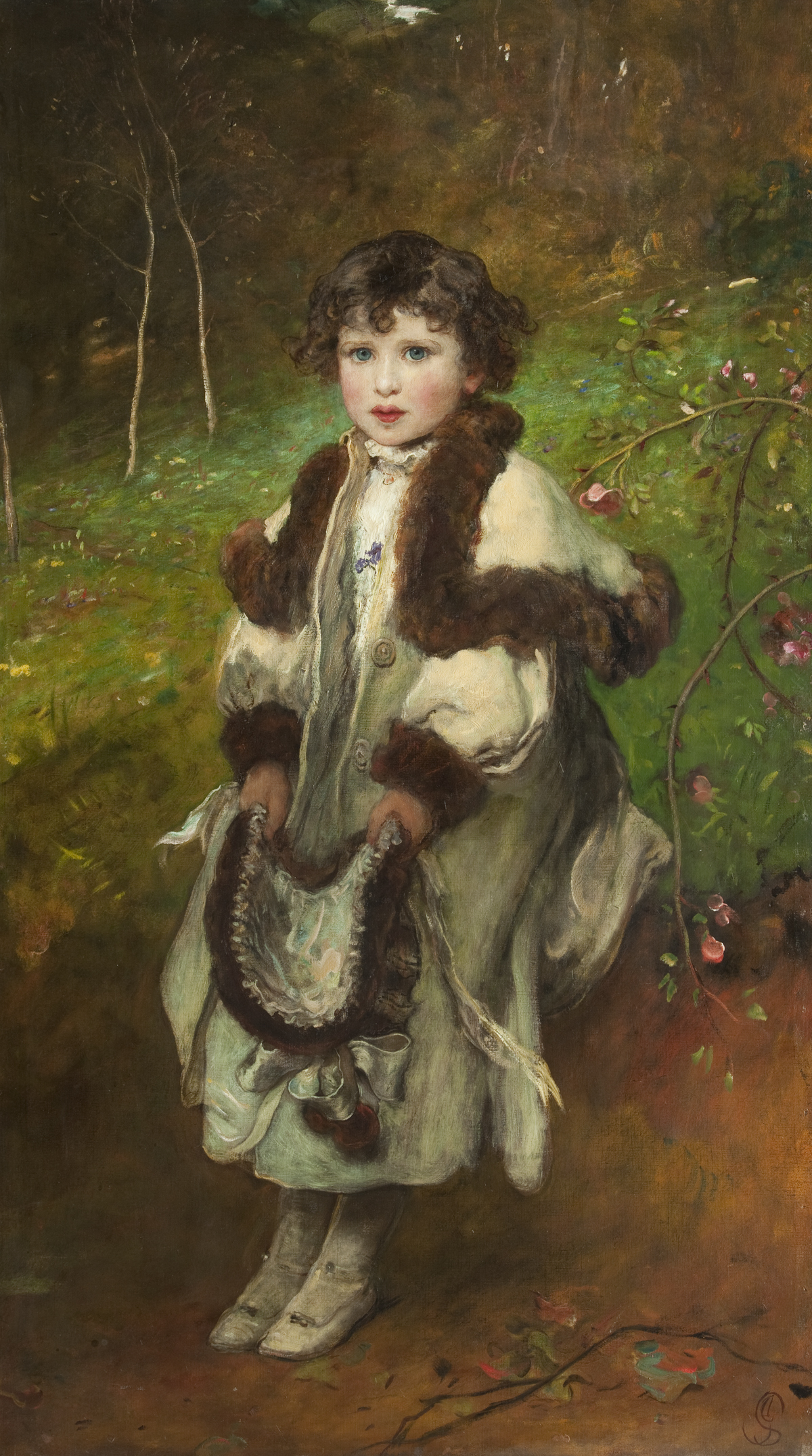
Julie Gollan, daughter of Spencer H. Gollan, Esq., 1898
(Harris Museum & Art Gallery)

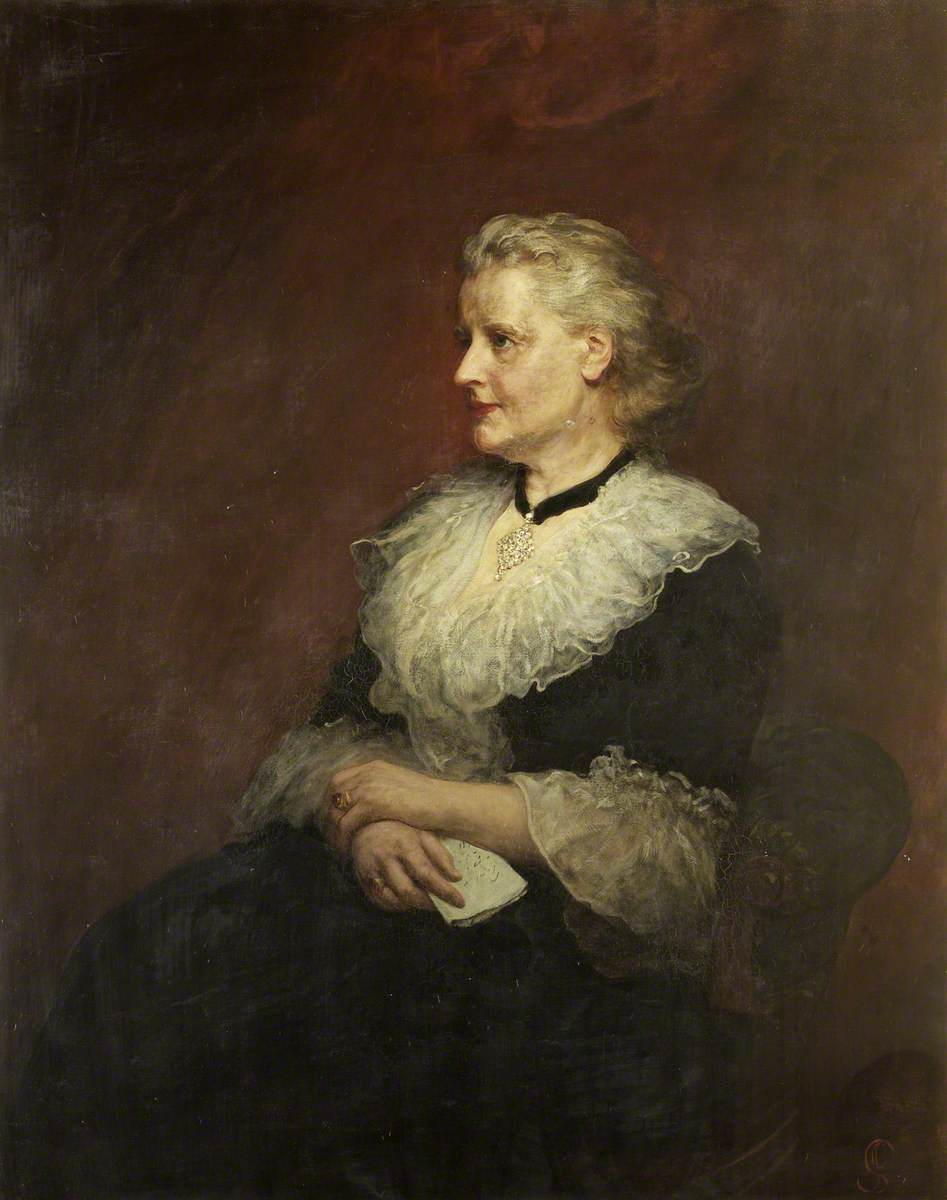
Dame Emily Francis of Ashton Court, c.1900
(Bristol Museum & Art Gallery)

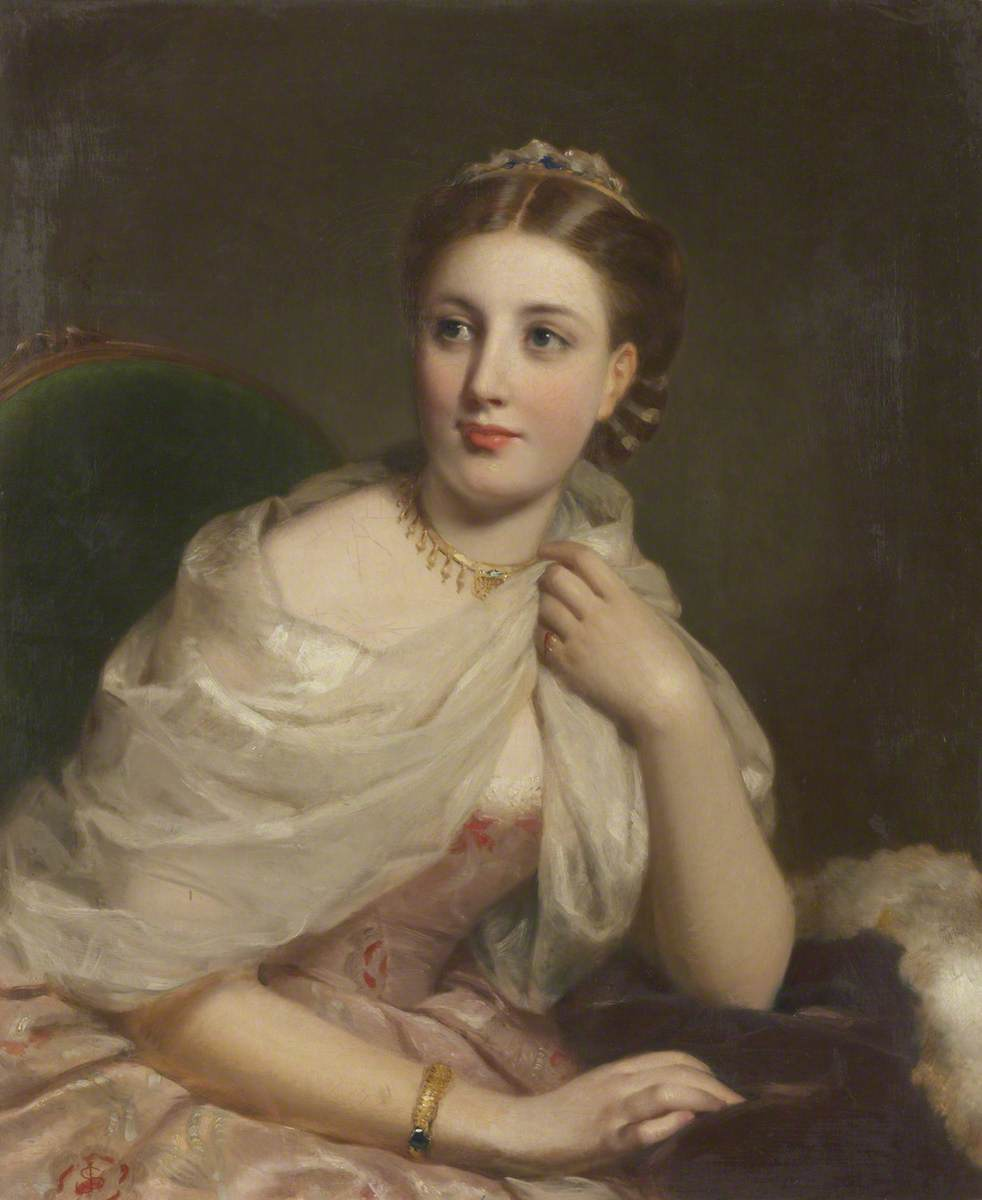
At the Opera, 1900
(Abbot Hall Art Gallery)

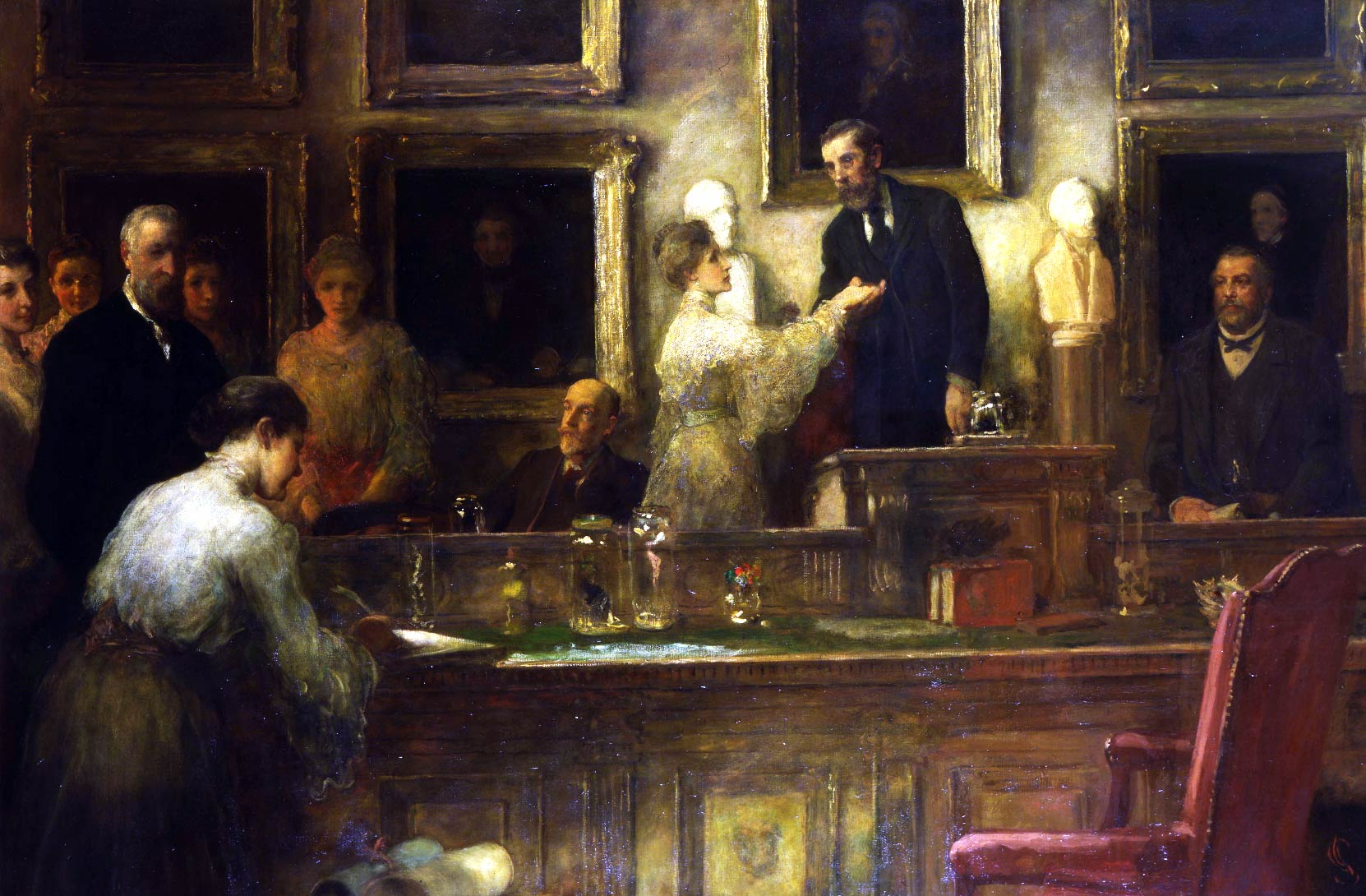
Linnean Society of London: First Formal Admission of Women Fellows, 1906
(Linnean Society of London)

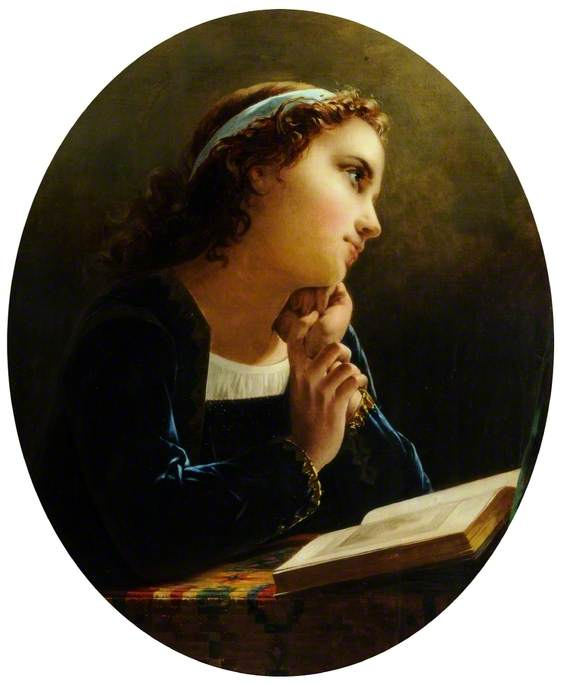
Meditation
(Sheffield Museums Trust)

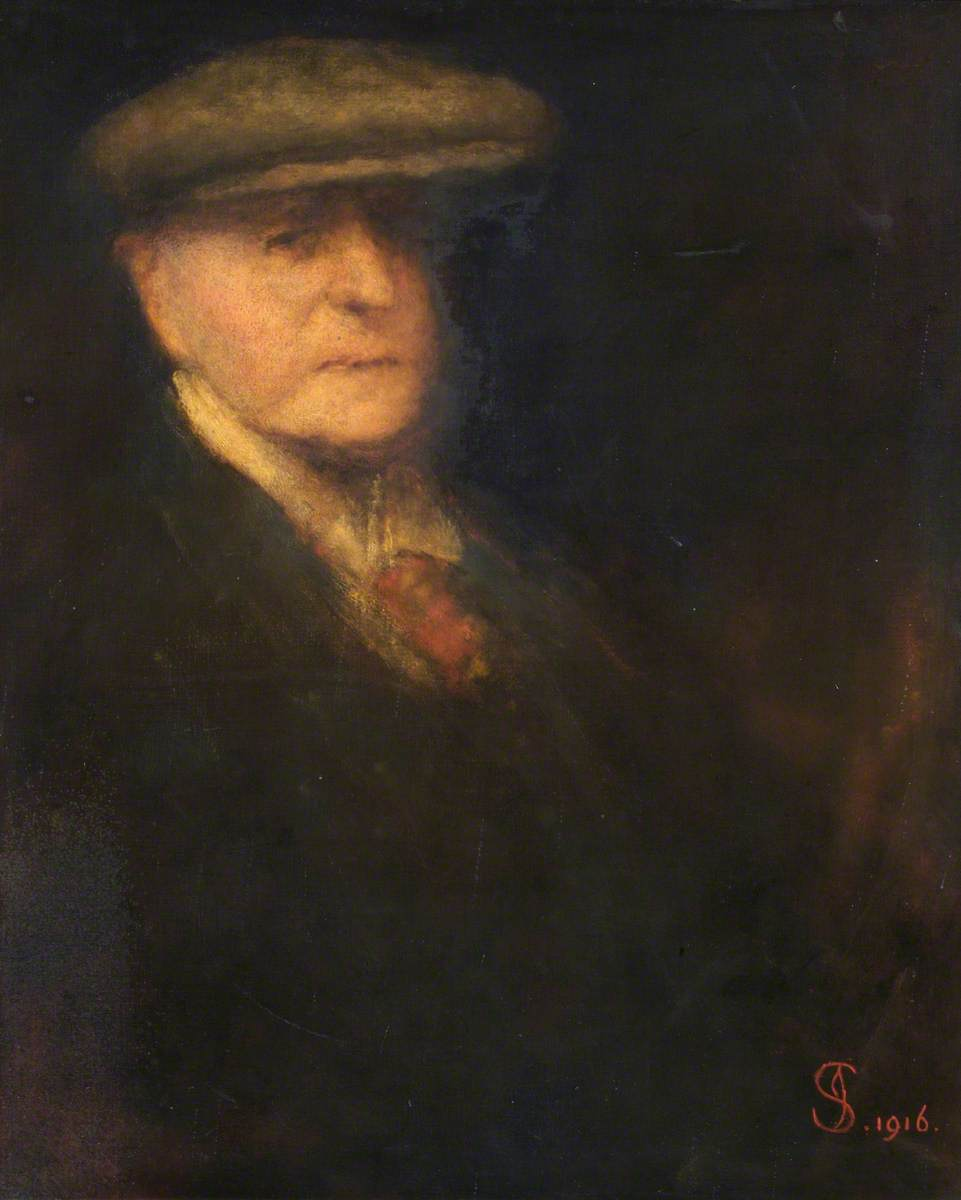
Self-portrait, 1916
(Royal Academy)

== Legacy and offices ==
Court offices
Preceded by Sir George Hayter	Principal Painter in Ordinary to the Queen; 1871–1901	Succeeded by —

== Sources ==
- Acquaintance with Lewis Carroll
- Biography with photo
- James Sant's son photographed by Lewis Carroll
- Obituary
- Profile on Royal Academy Collection
