= Royal Academy Exhibition of 1881 =

1881 art exhibition in London

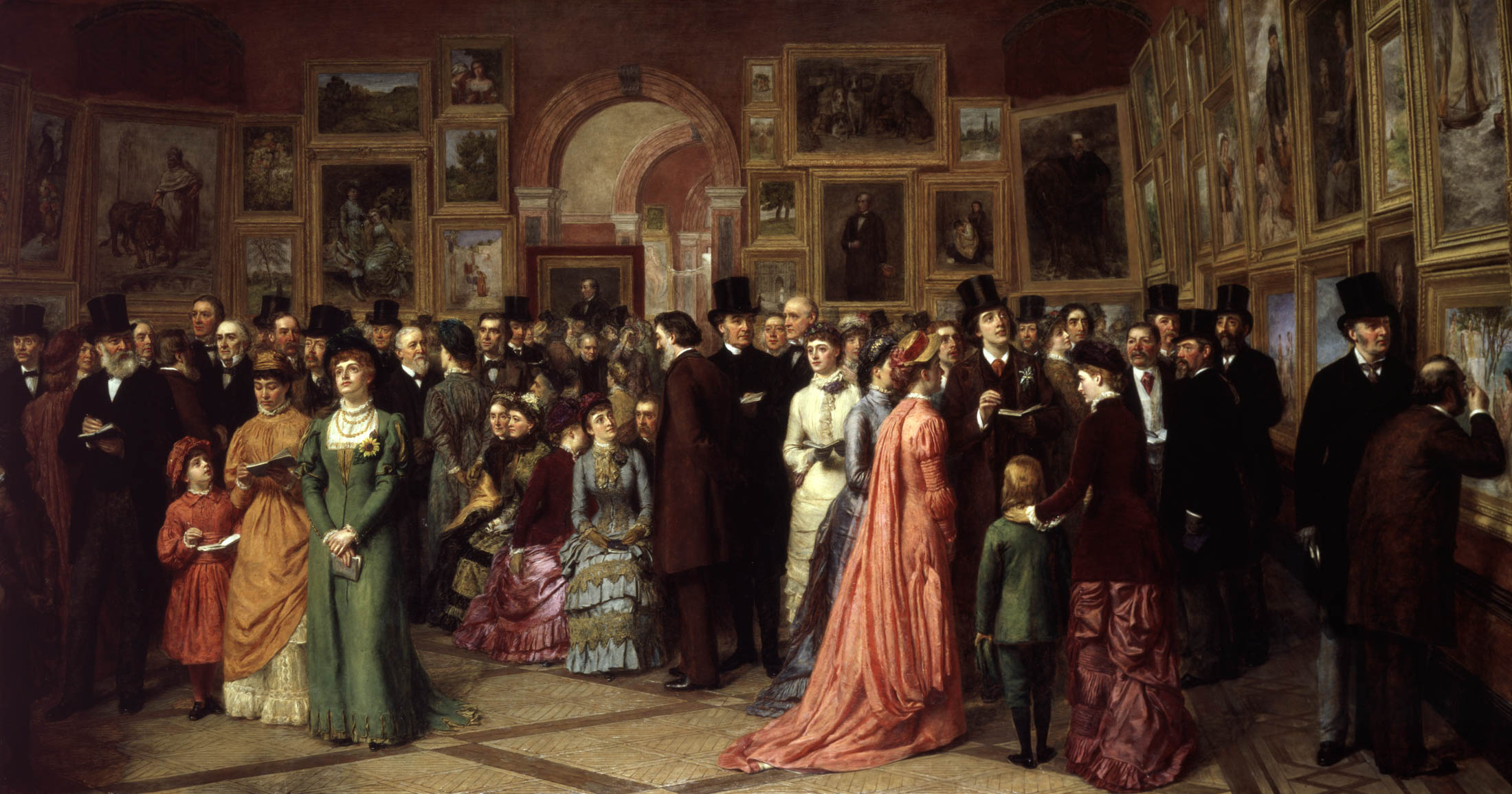
A Private View at the Royal Academy, 1881 by William Powell Frith

The Royal Academy Exhibition of 1881 was the hundred and thirteenth annual Summer Exhibition of the Royal Academy of Arts. It was held from 2 May to 1 August 1881 at Burlington House in Piccadilly, attracting 344,000 visitors during its run.

The exhibition is best known through William Powell Frith's painting A Private View at the Royal Academy, 1881 which was produced two years later and featured at the 1883 exhibition. It shows fashionable society figures mingling in front of the walls hung with that year's submissions.

Academic art was represented in a number of paintings. Edwin Long's Diana or Christ? featured a scene in Ancient Rome. Also featured were A Roman Holiday by Briton Rivière, Winter Quarters by Frank Paton, The Symbol by Frank Dicksee and The Battle of Kandahar by Richard Caron Woodville. James Tissot displayed Quiet and Goodbye on the Mersey.

The exhibition faced completion elsewhere with the rival show at the Grosvenor Gallery featuring prominent works while Elizabeth Thompson's submission to the Royal Academy The Defence of Rorke's Drift was overshadowed by her Scotland Forever! on display at the nearby Egyptian Hall.

== Gallery ==
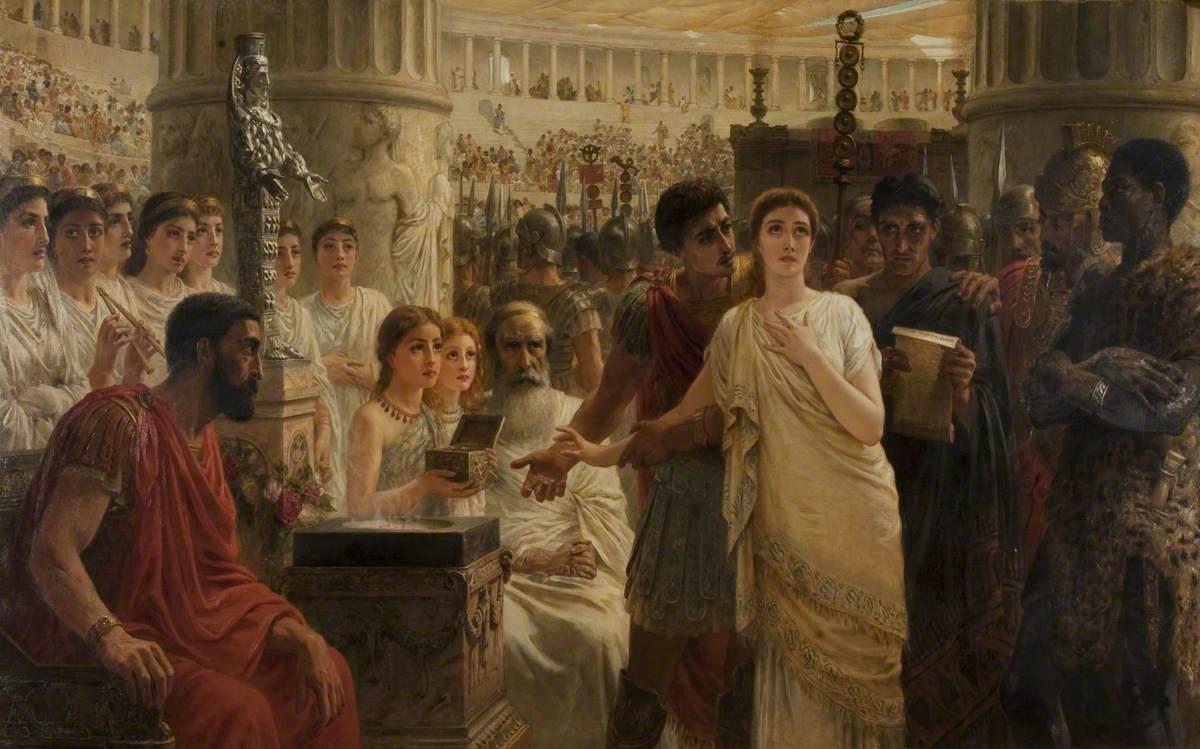
Diana or Christ? by Edwin Long

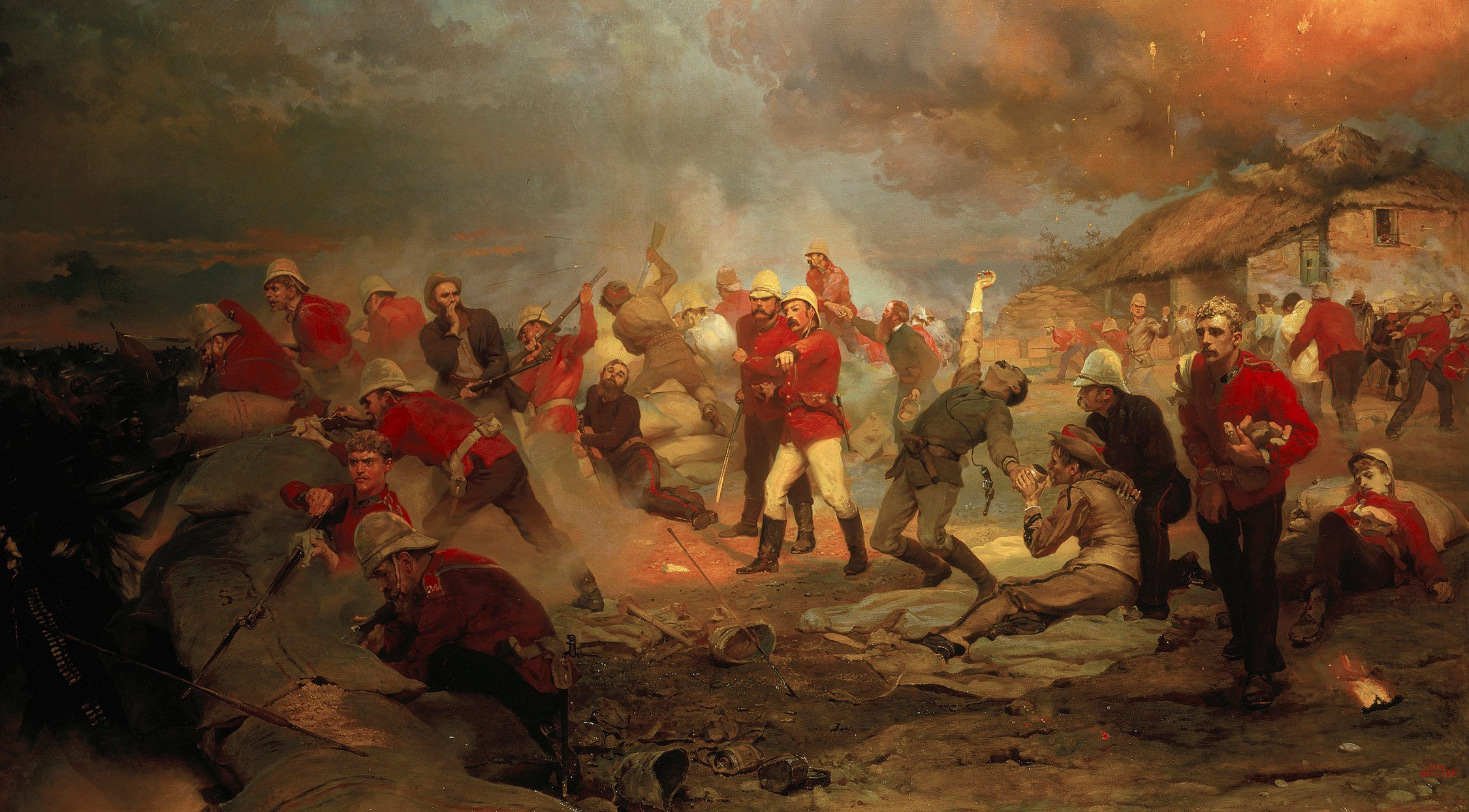
The Defence of Rorke's Drift by Elizabeth Thompson

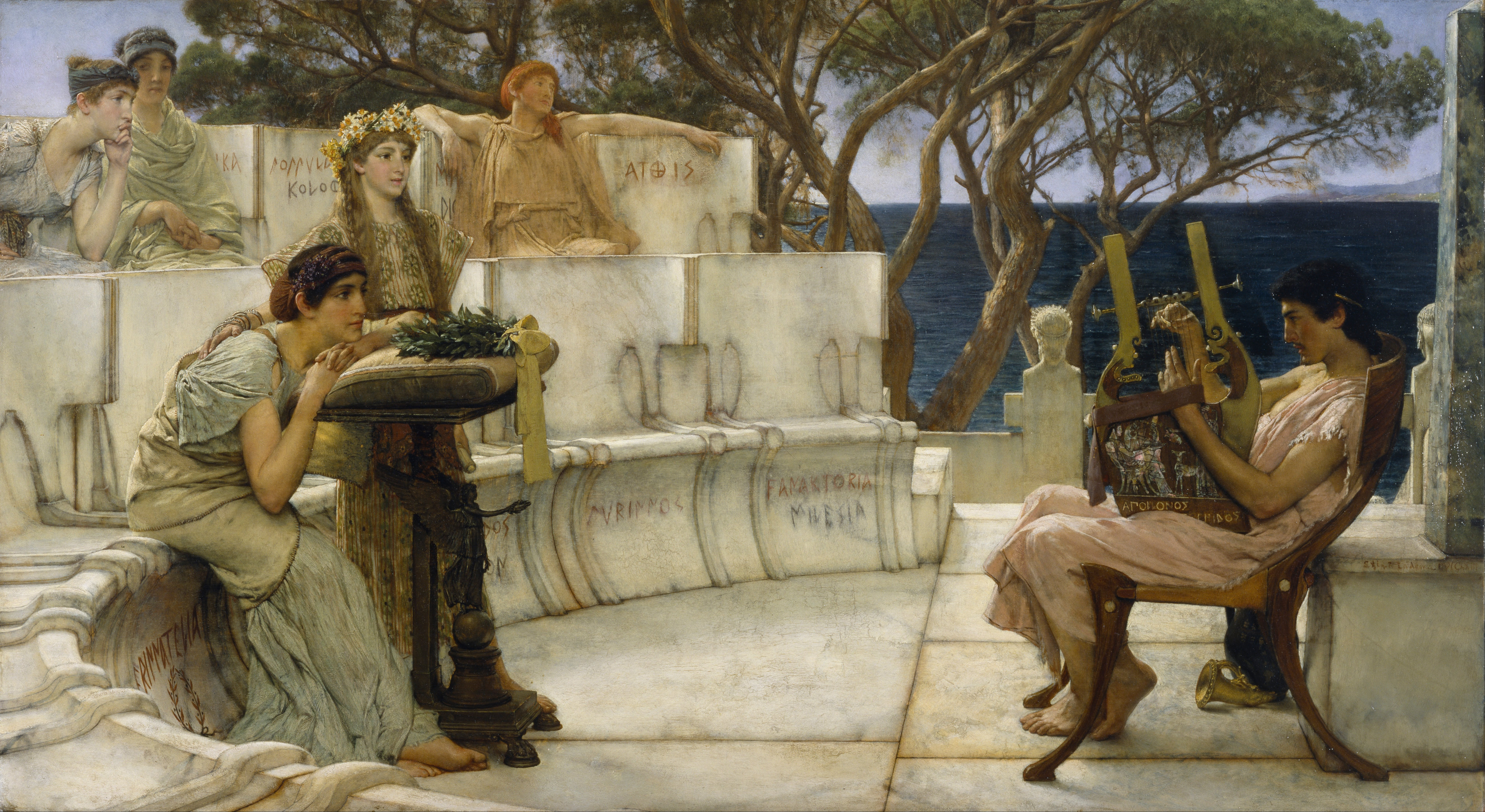
Sappho and Alcaeus by Lawrence Alma-Tadema

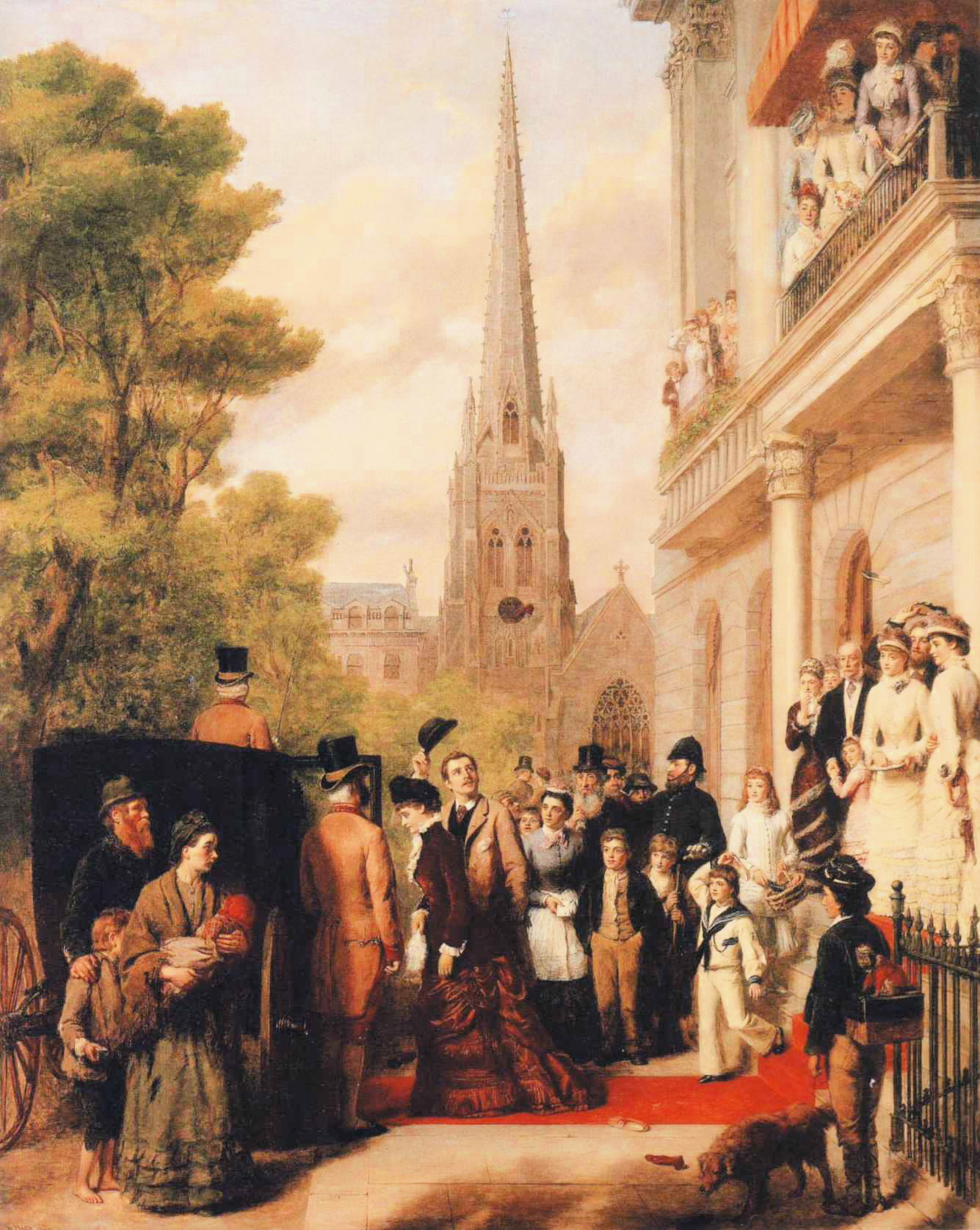
For Better, For Worse by William Powell Frith

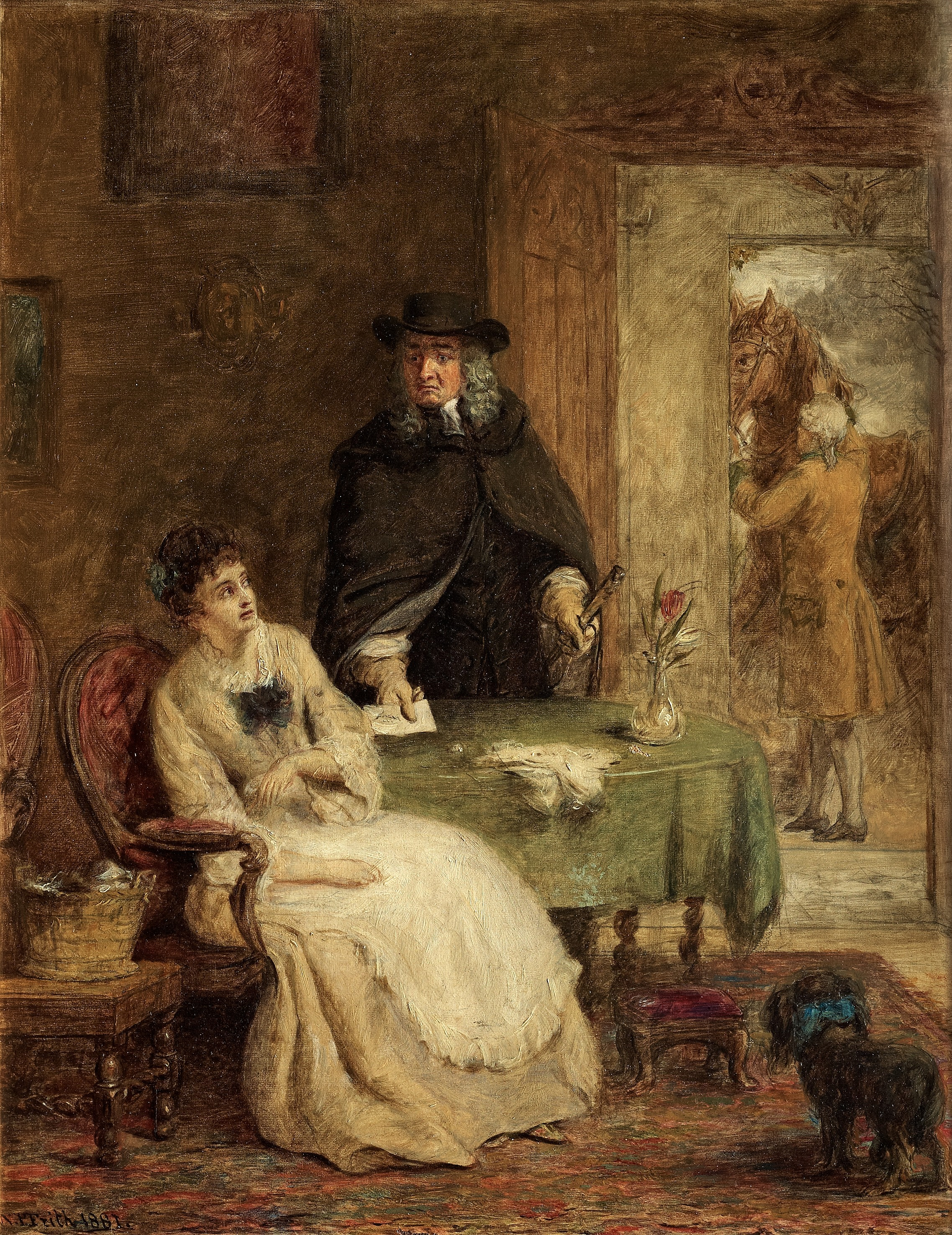
Swift and Vanessa by William Powell Frith

Alms Houses, Antwerp by William Logsdail

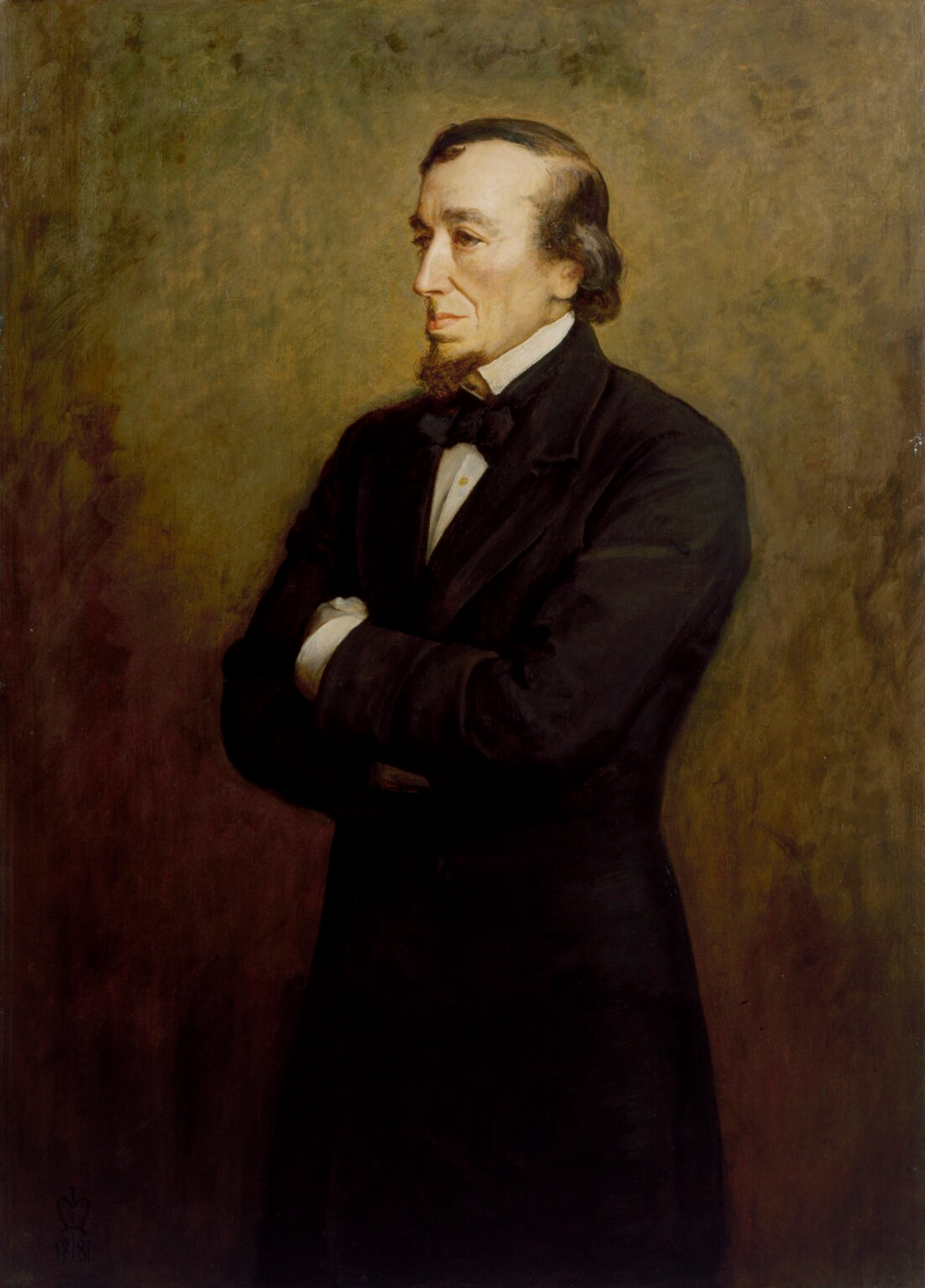
Portrait of Benjamin Disraeli by John Everett Millais

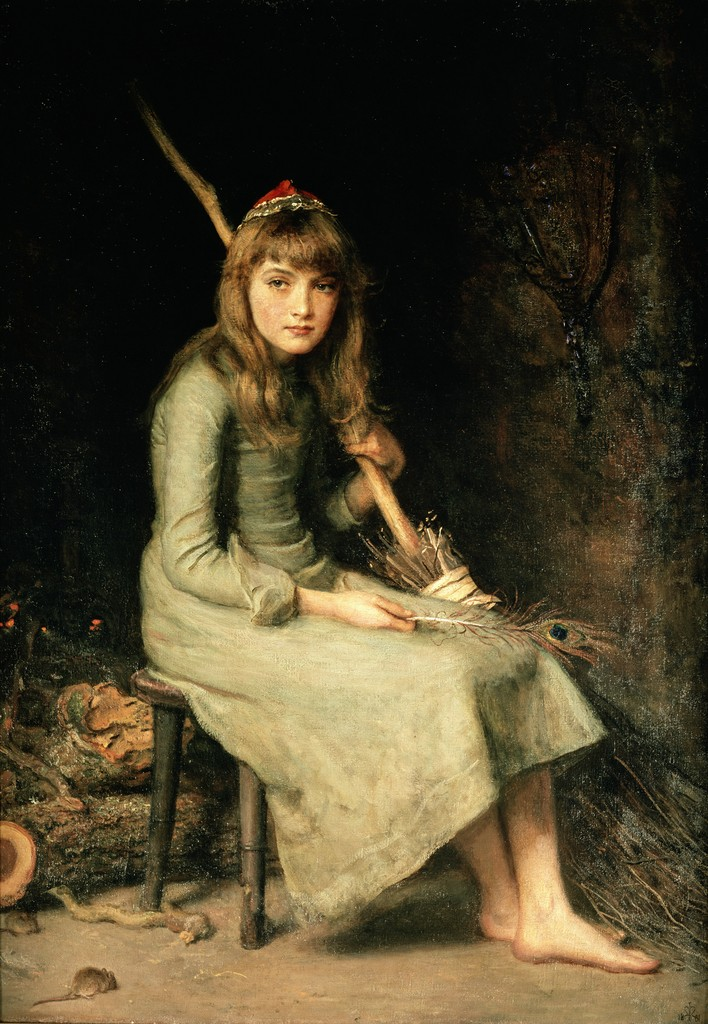
Cinderella by John Everett Millais

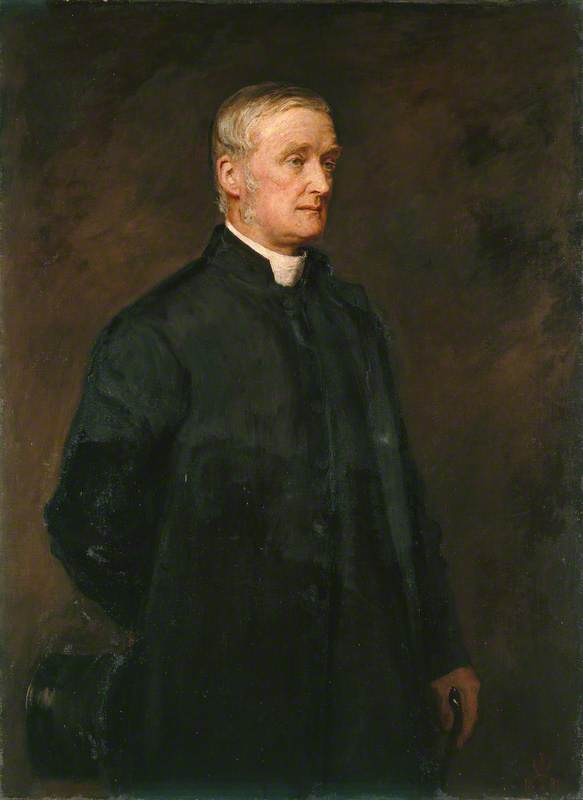
Portrait of James Fraser by John Everett Millais

Spring Morning, Haverstock Hill by George Clausen

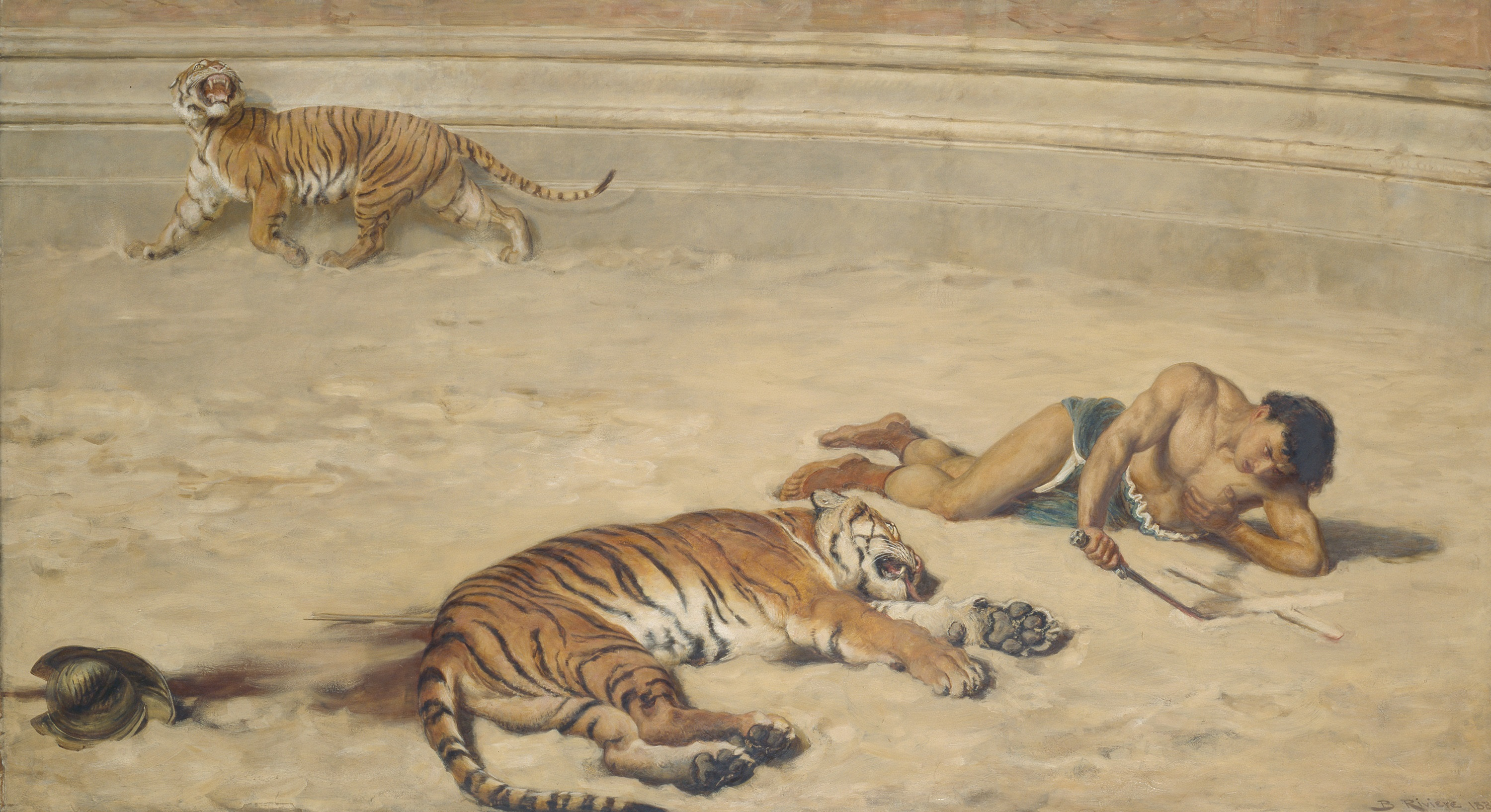
A Roman Holiday by Briton Rivière

Envy, Hatred and Malice by Briton Rivière

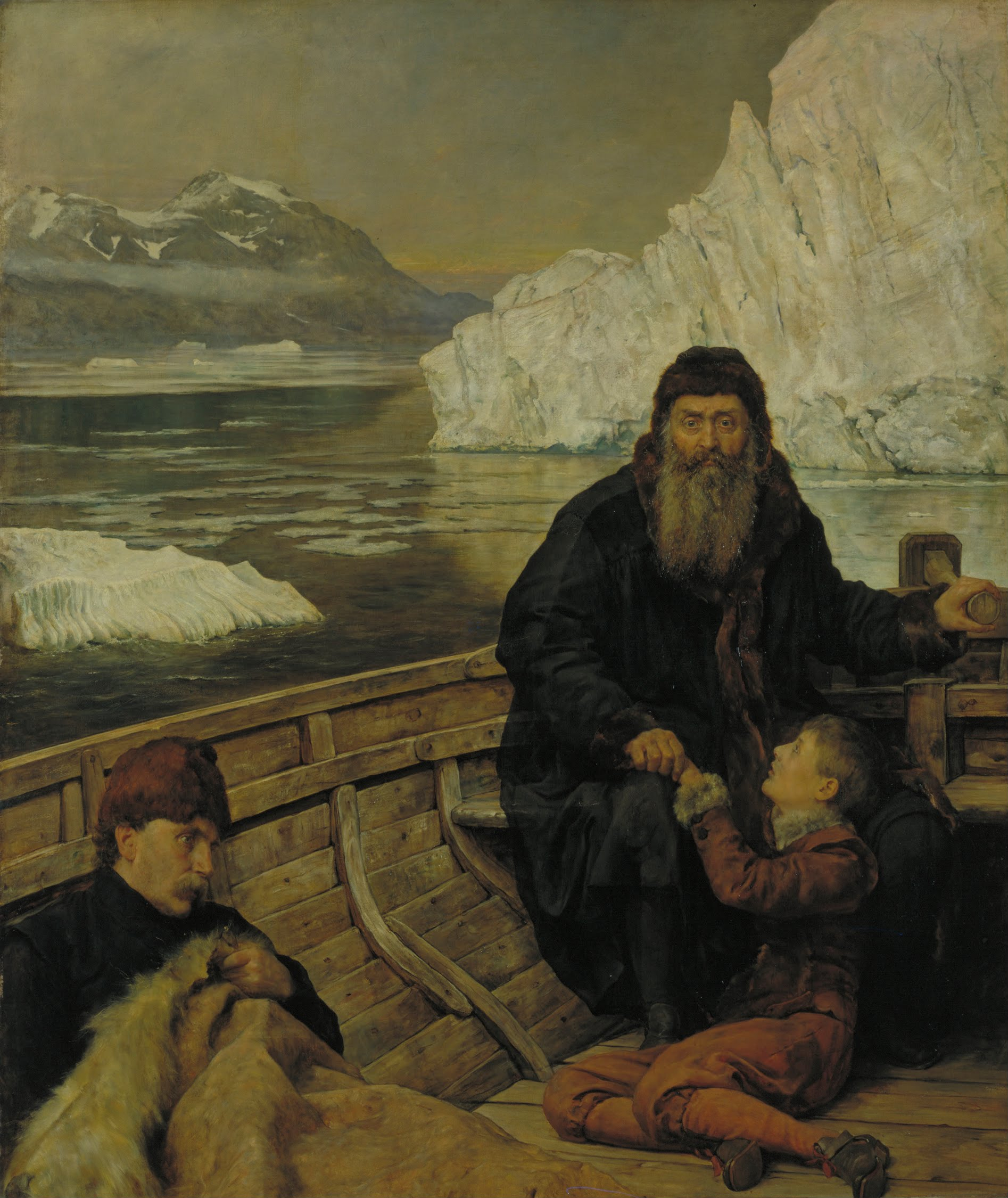
The Last Voyage of Henry Hudson by John Collier

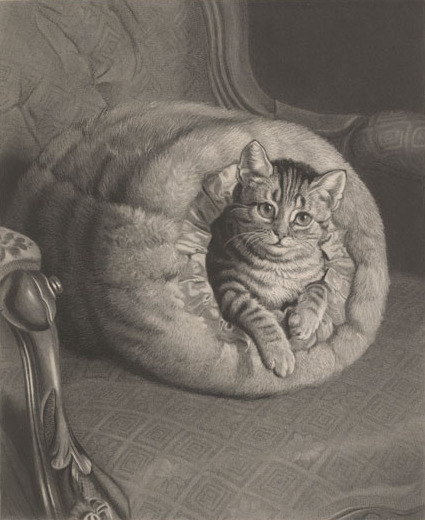
Winter Quarters, an engraving based on the work by Frank Paton

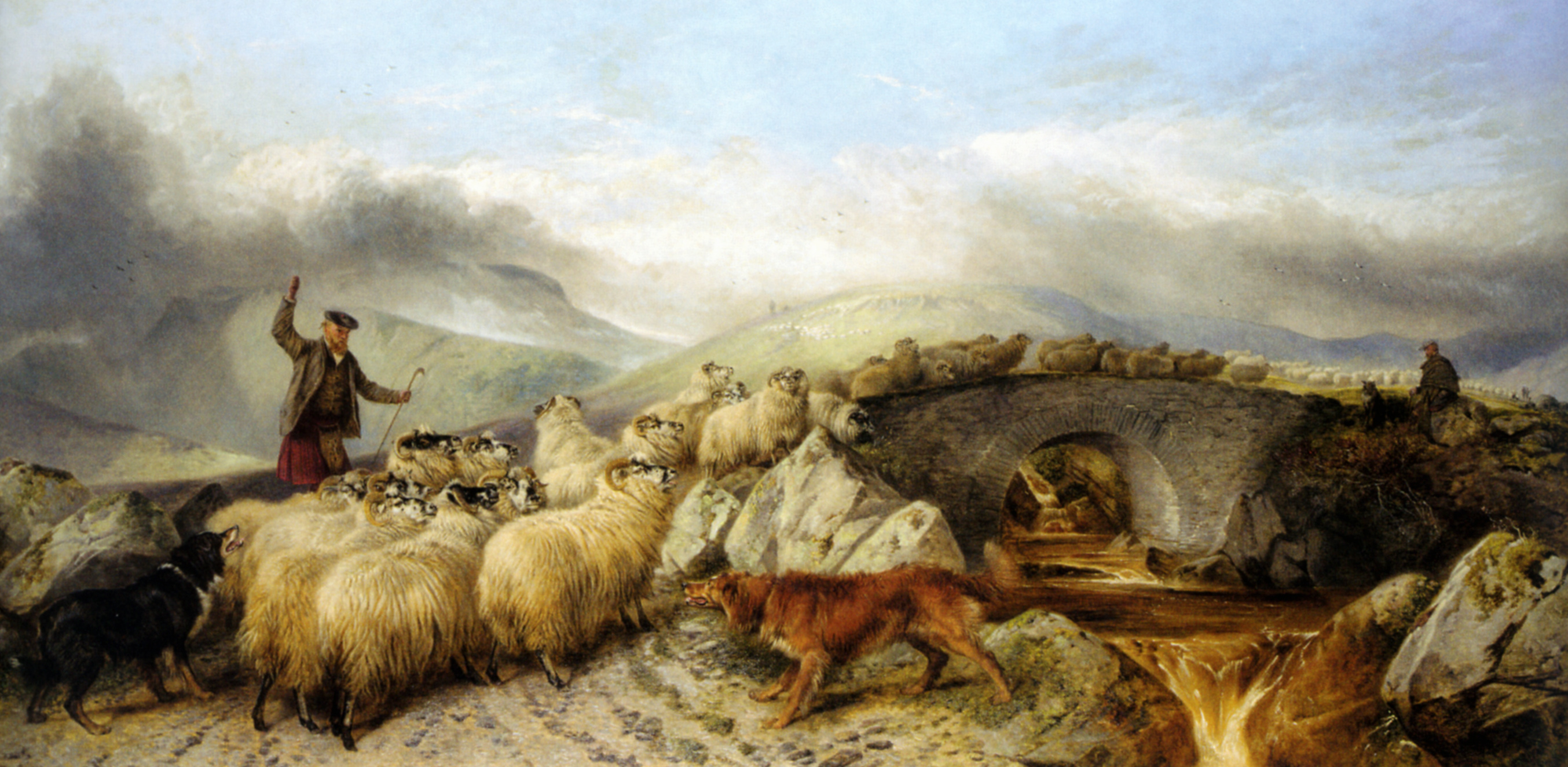
Collecting the Sheep by Richard Ansdell

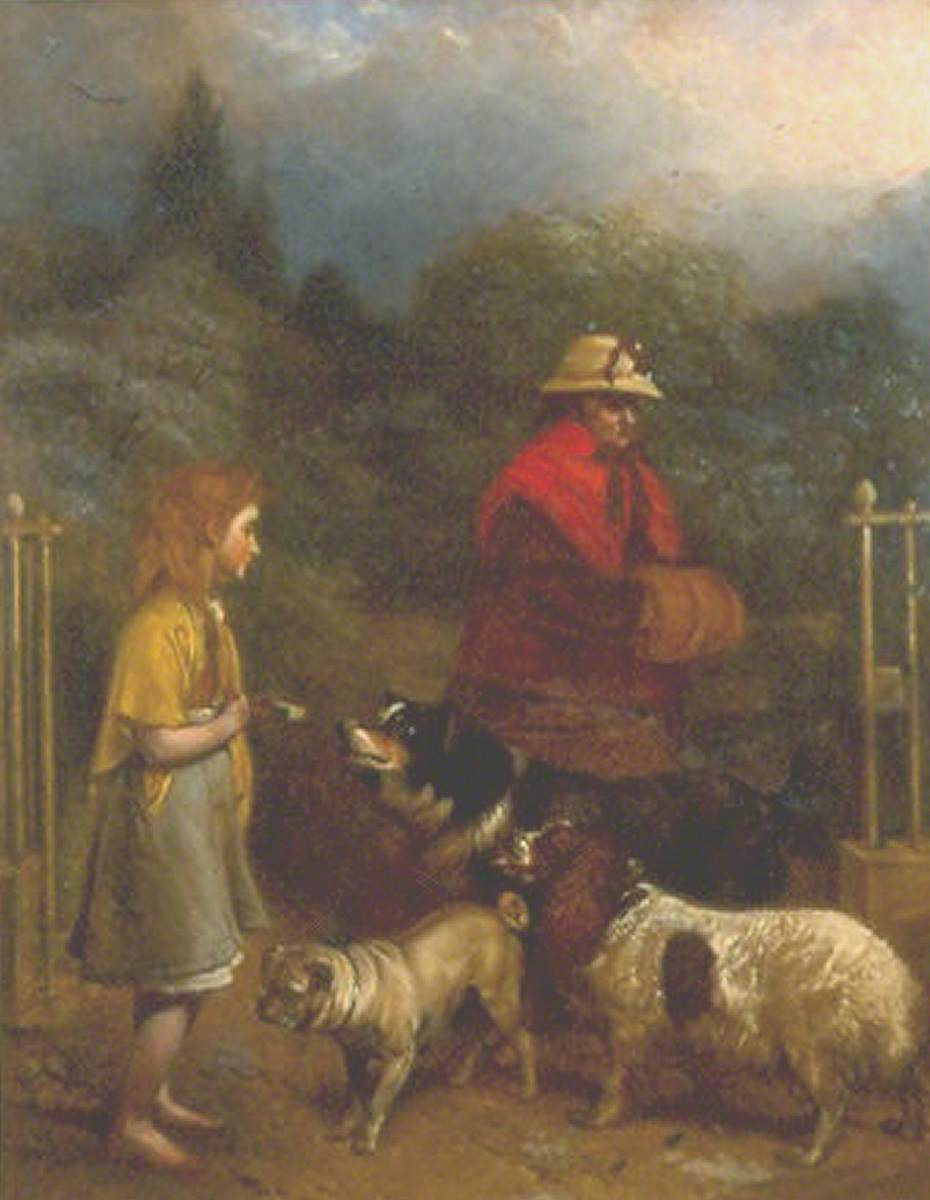
Misplaced Affections by Richard Ansdell

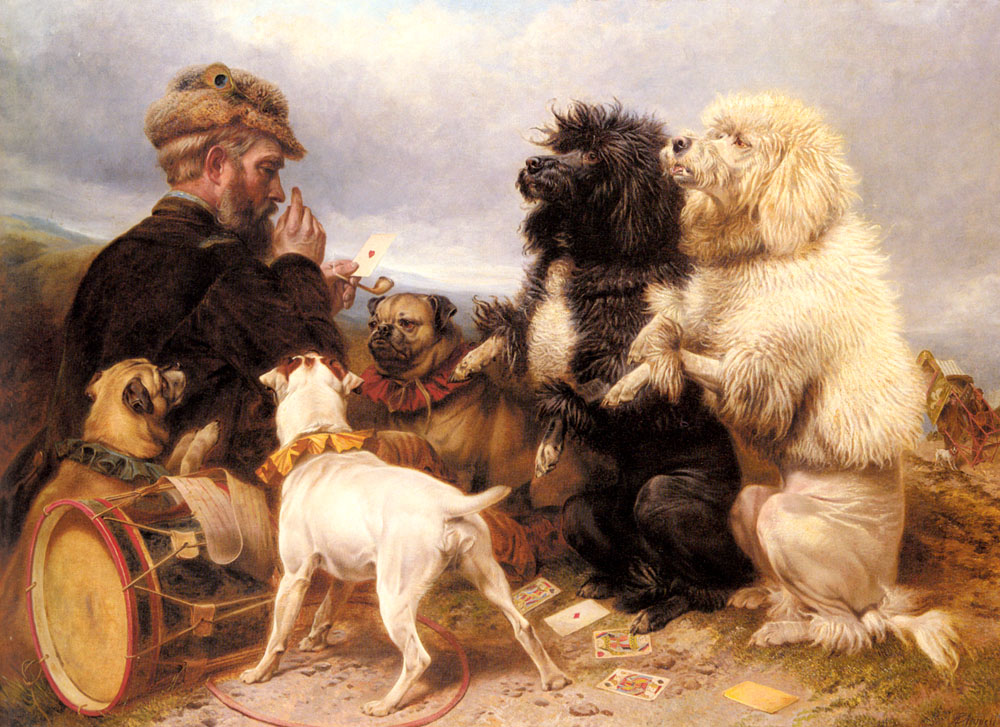
The Lucky Dogs by Richard Ansdell

Home Again! by Frank Holl

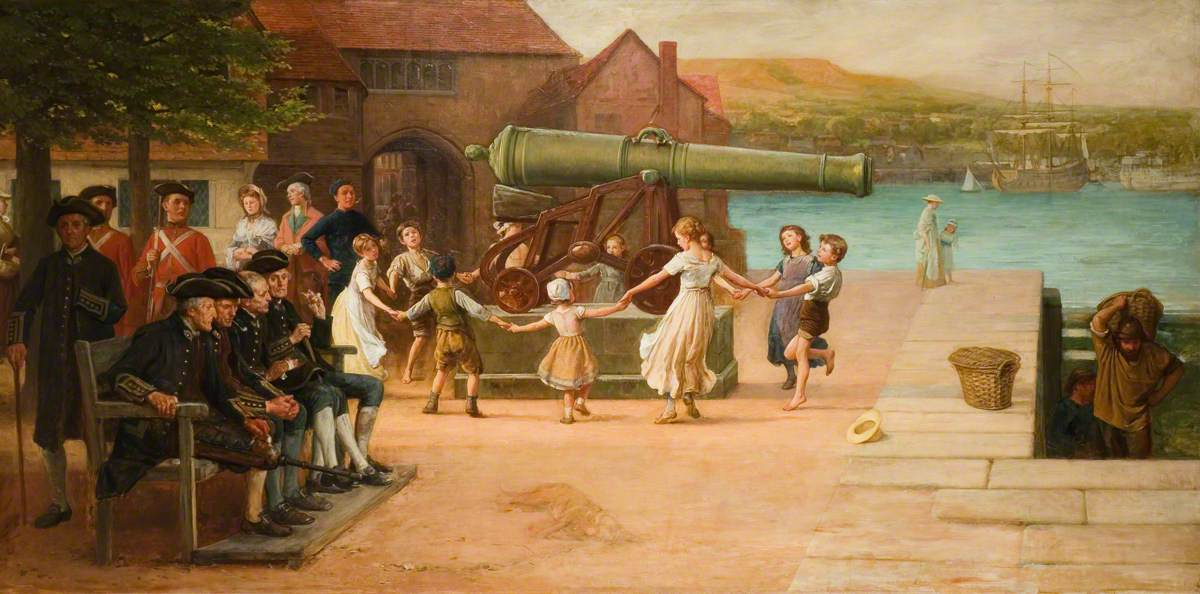
Here We Go Round the Mulberry Bush by William Frederick Yeames

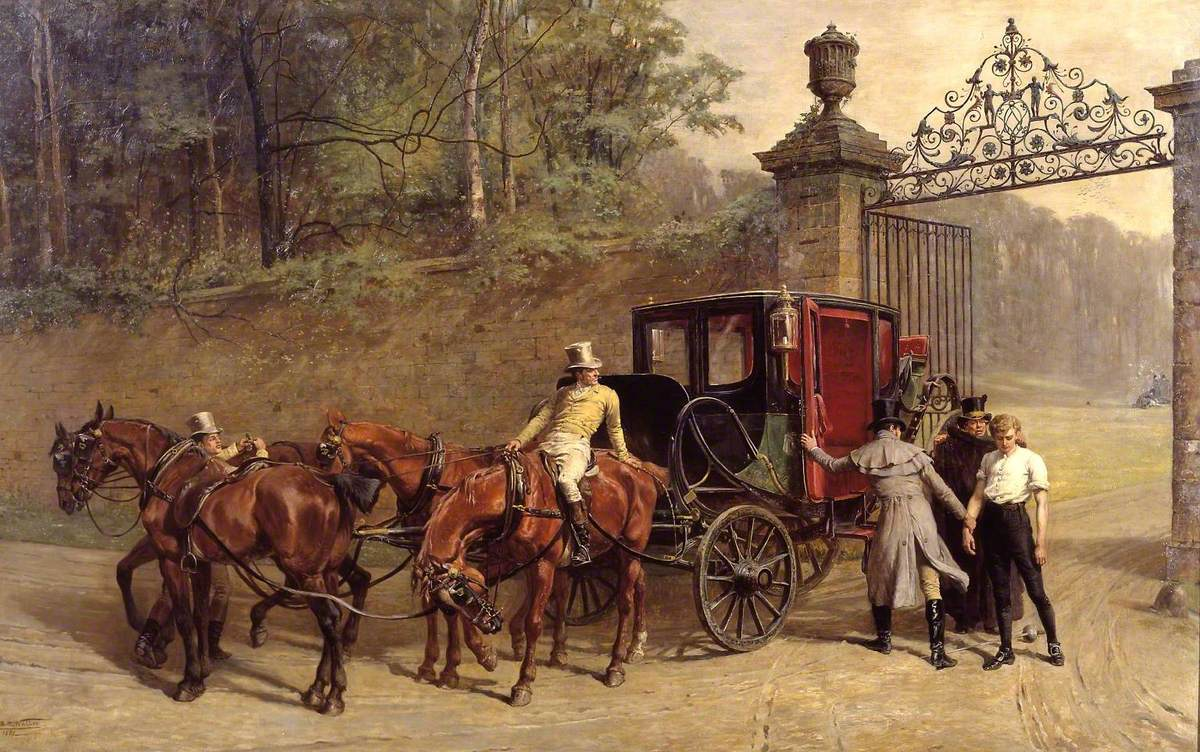
Success! by Samuel Edmund Waller

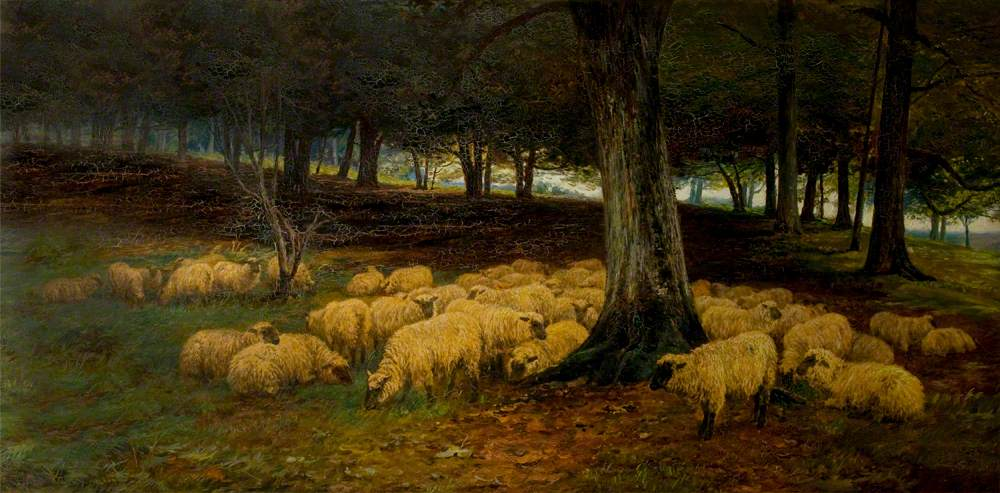
A Cool Retreat by Henry Garland

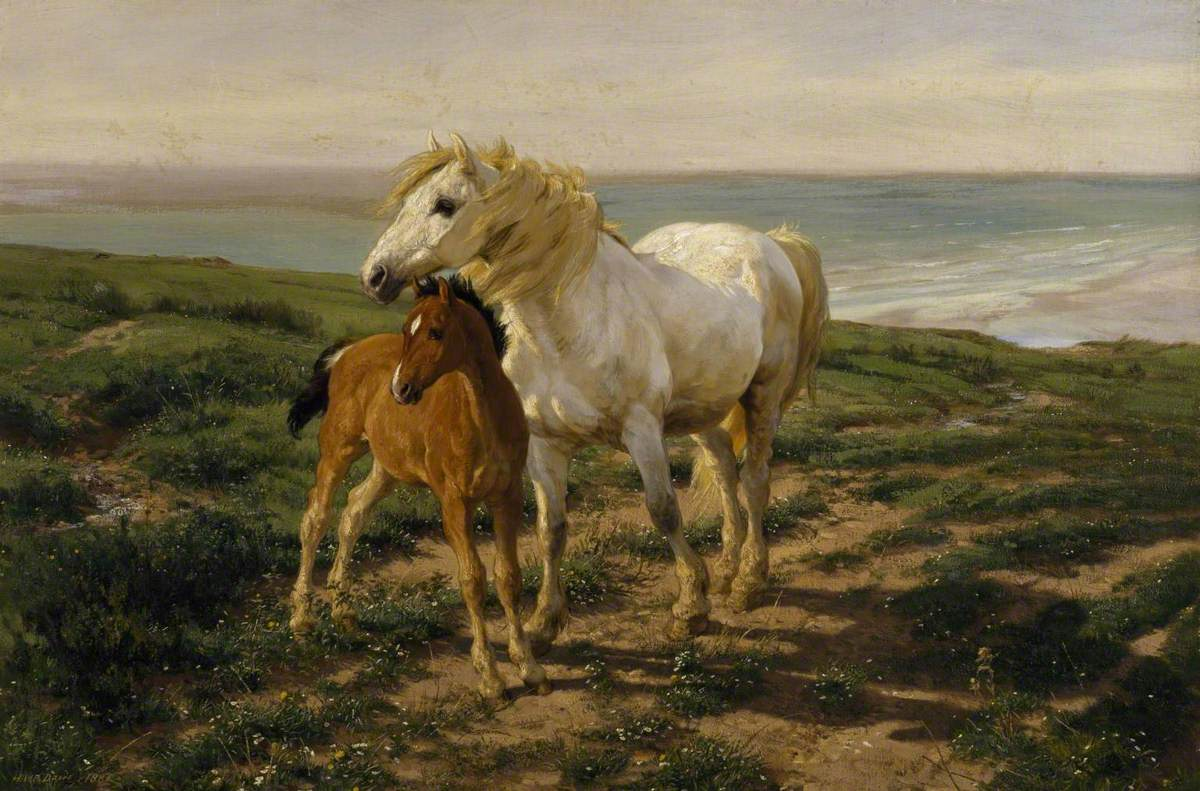
Mother and Son by Henry William Banks Davis

The Symbol by Frank Dicksee

Yellow Marguerites by Albert Joseph Moore

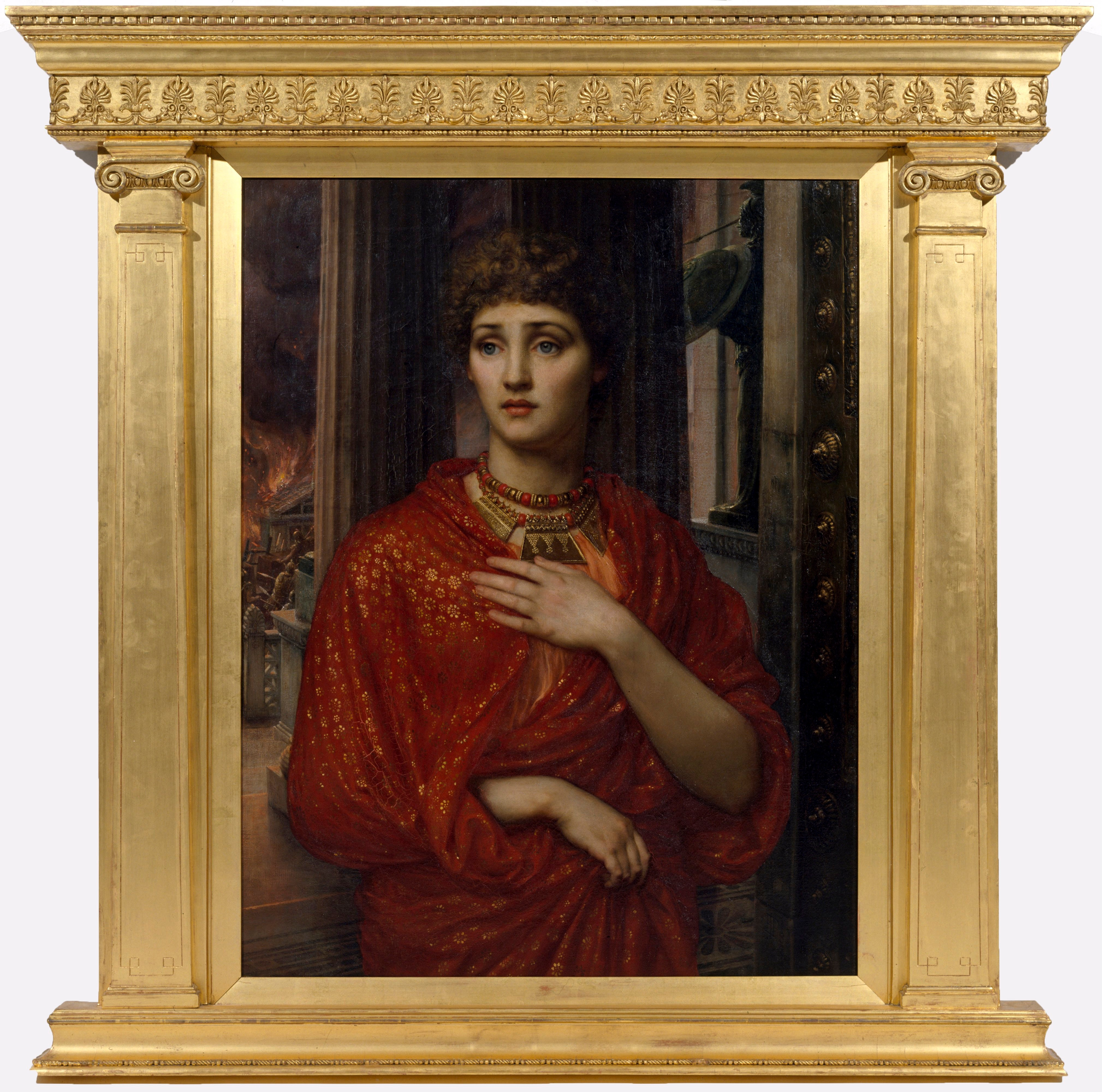
Helen by Edward Poynter

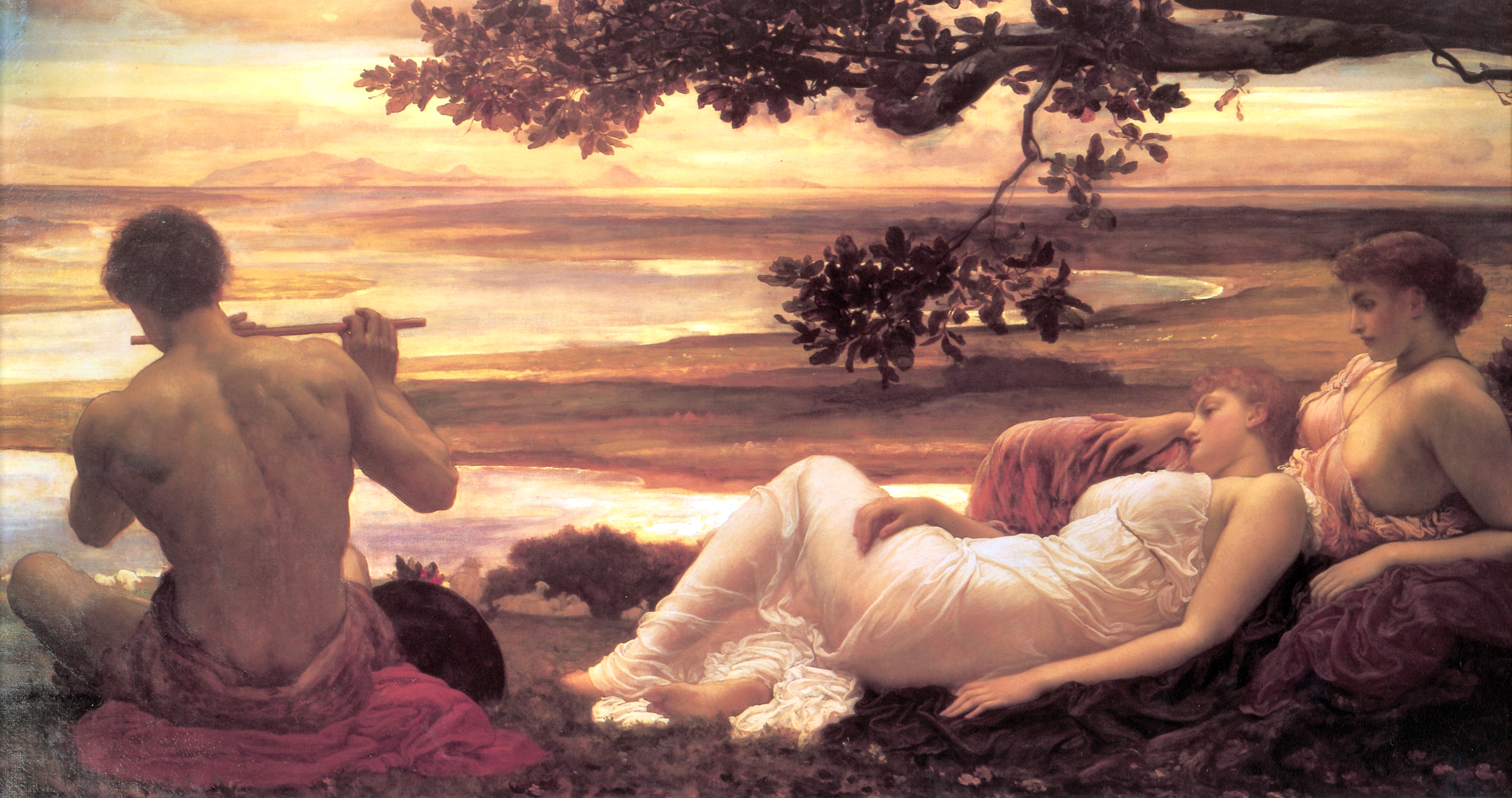
Idyll by Frederic Leighton

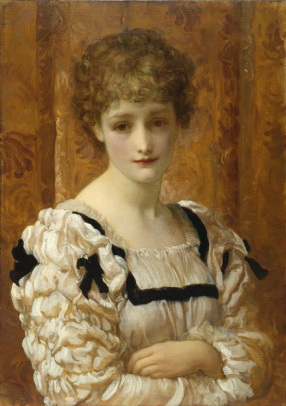
Bianca by Frederic Leighton

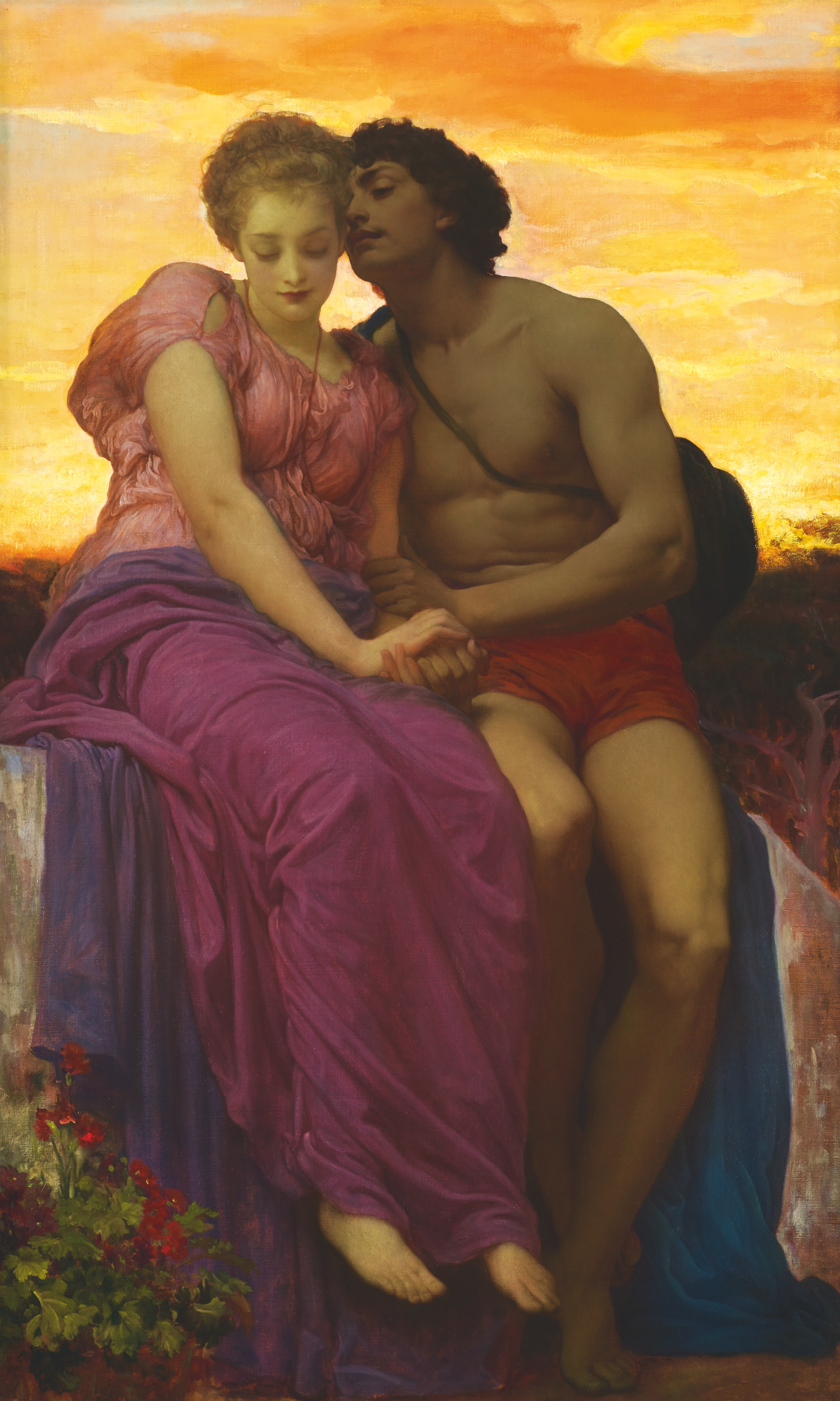
Whispers by Frederic Leighton

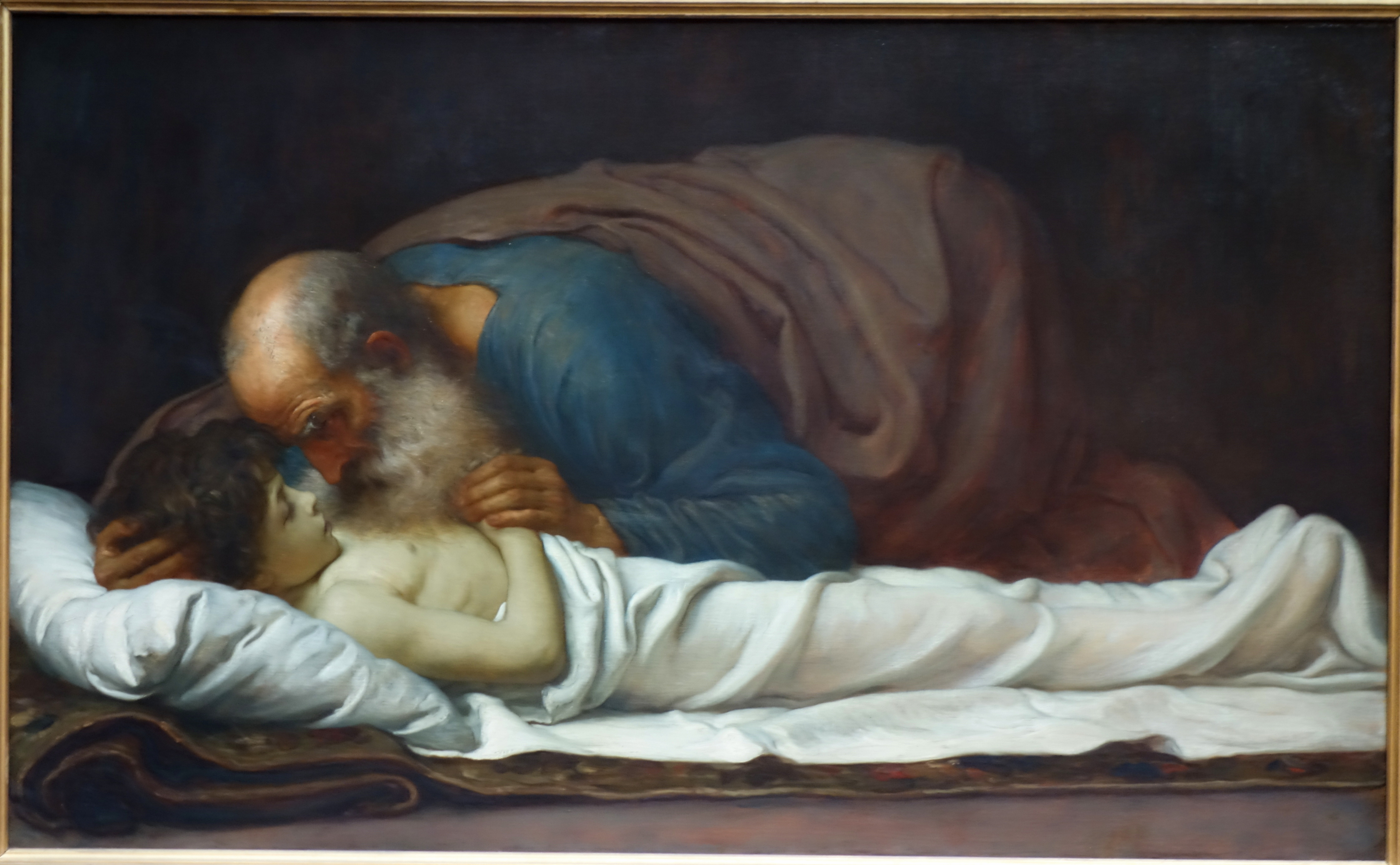
Elisha Raising the Son of the Shunamite by Frederic Leighton

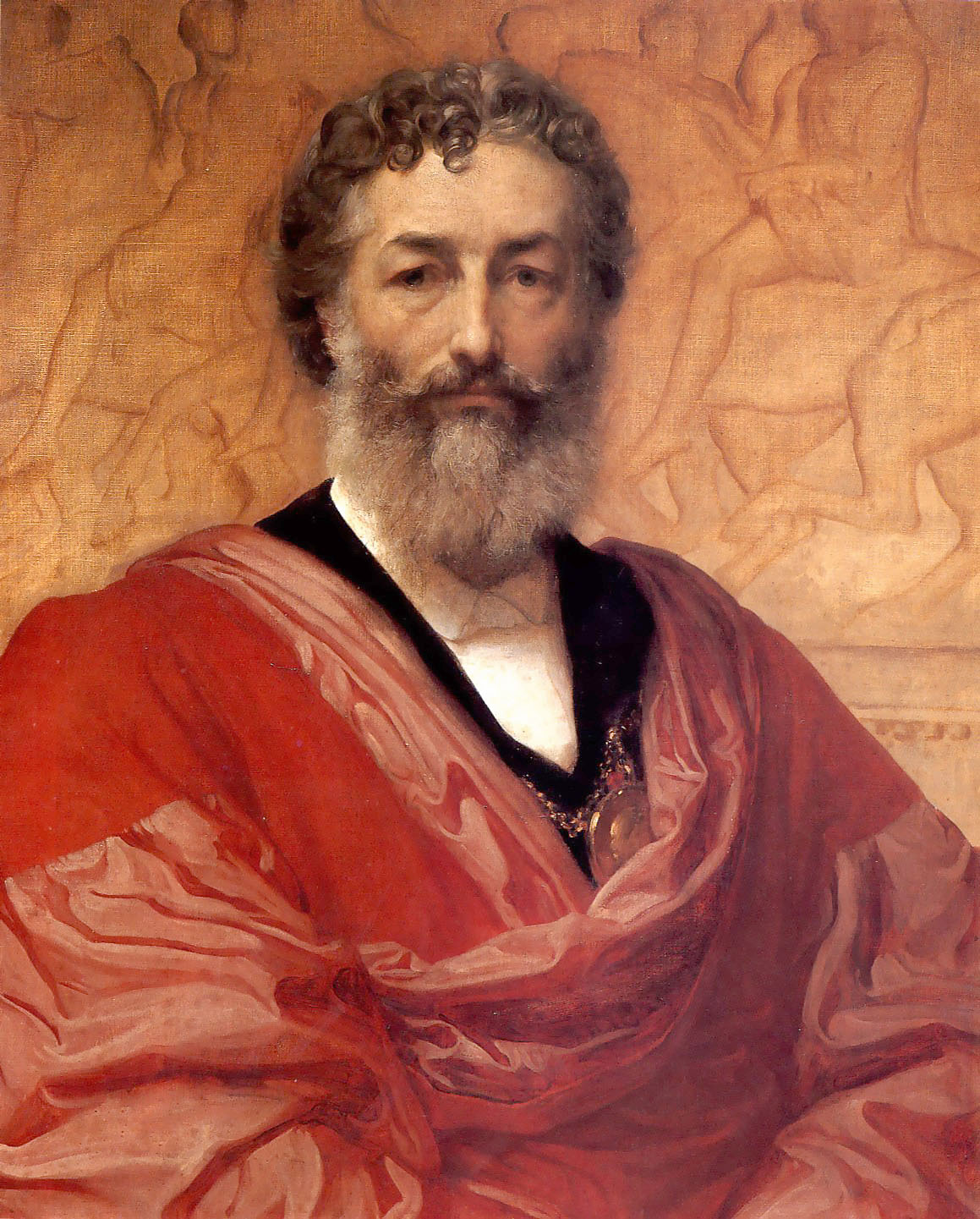
Self-portrait by Frederic Leighton

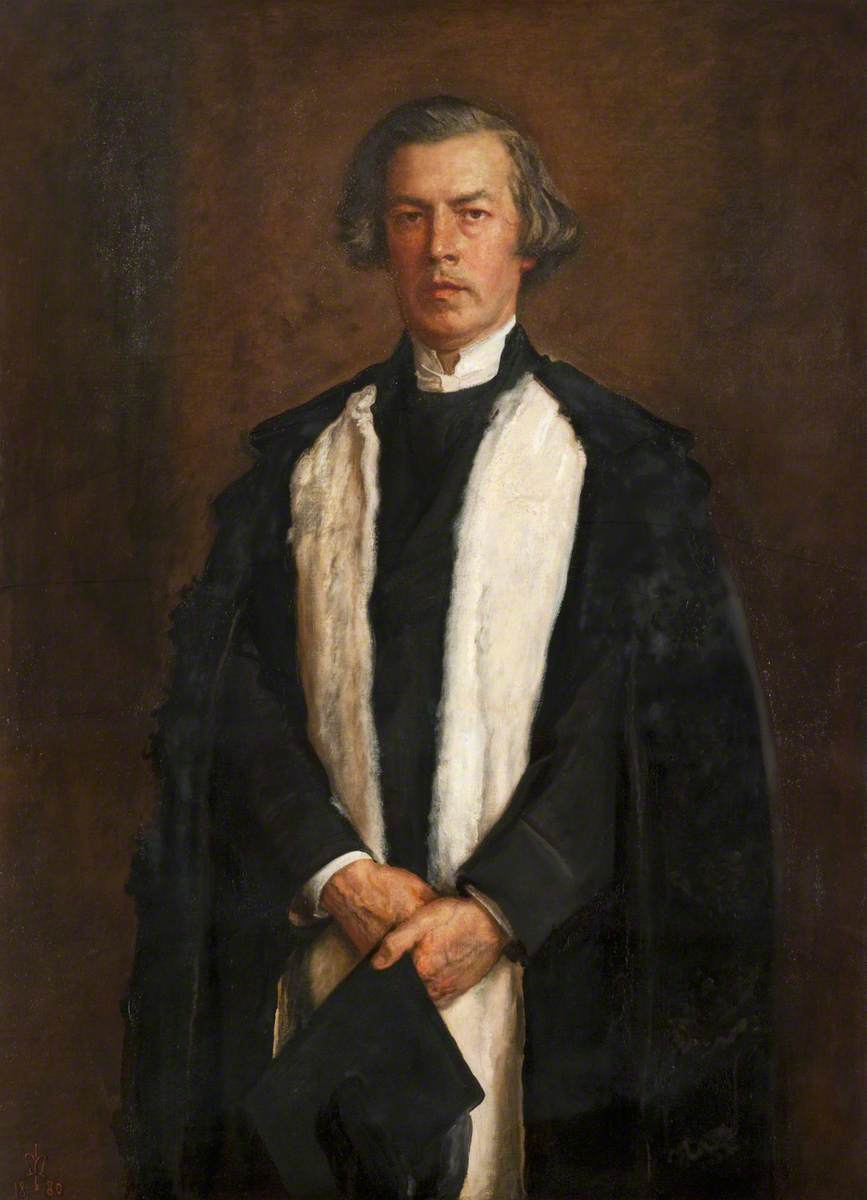
Portrait of John Caird by John Everett Millais

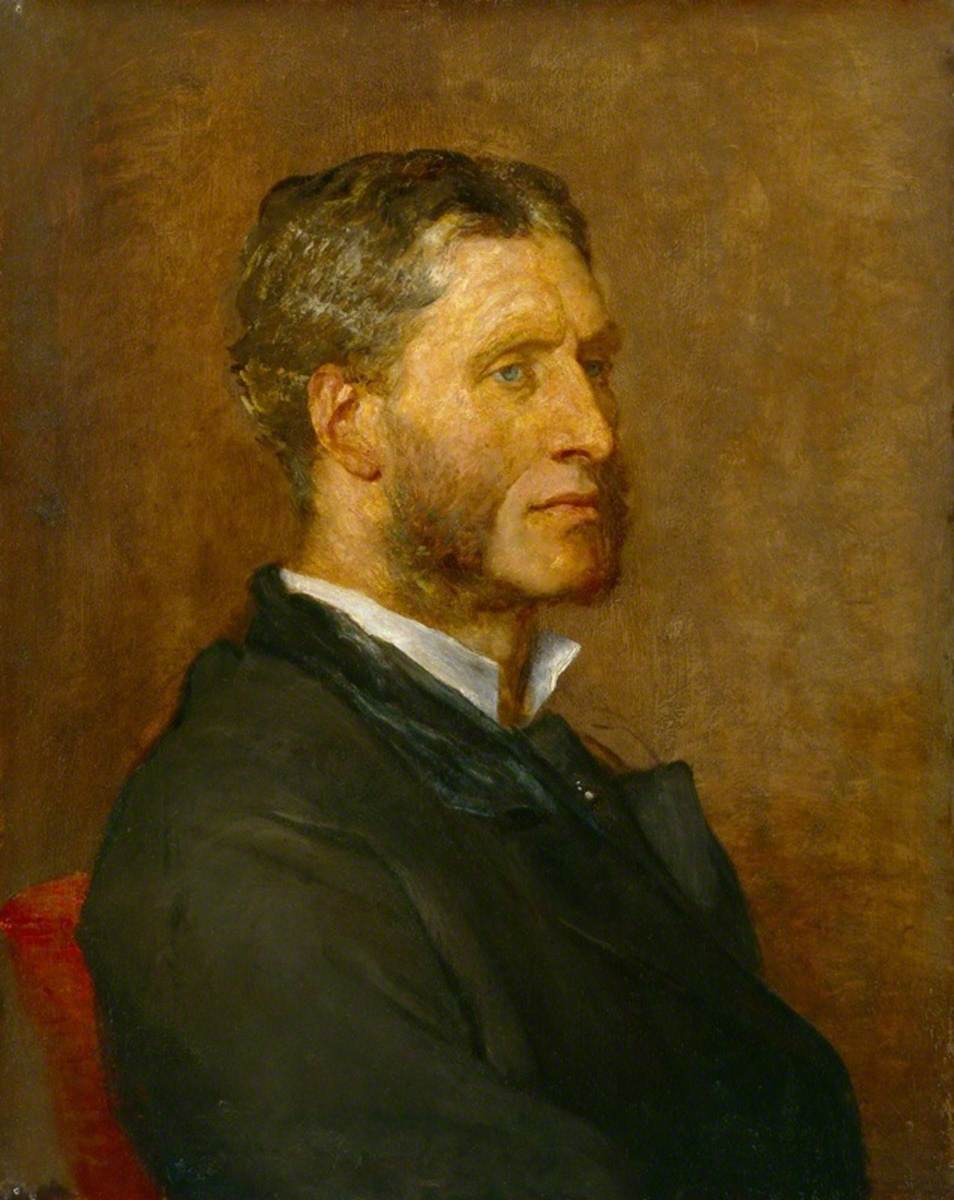
Portrait of Matthew Arnold by George Frederic Watts

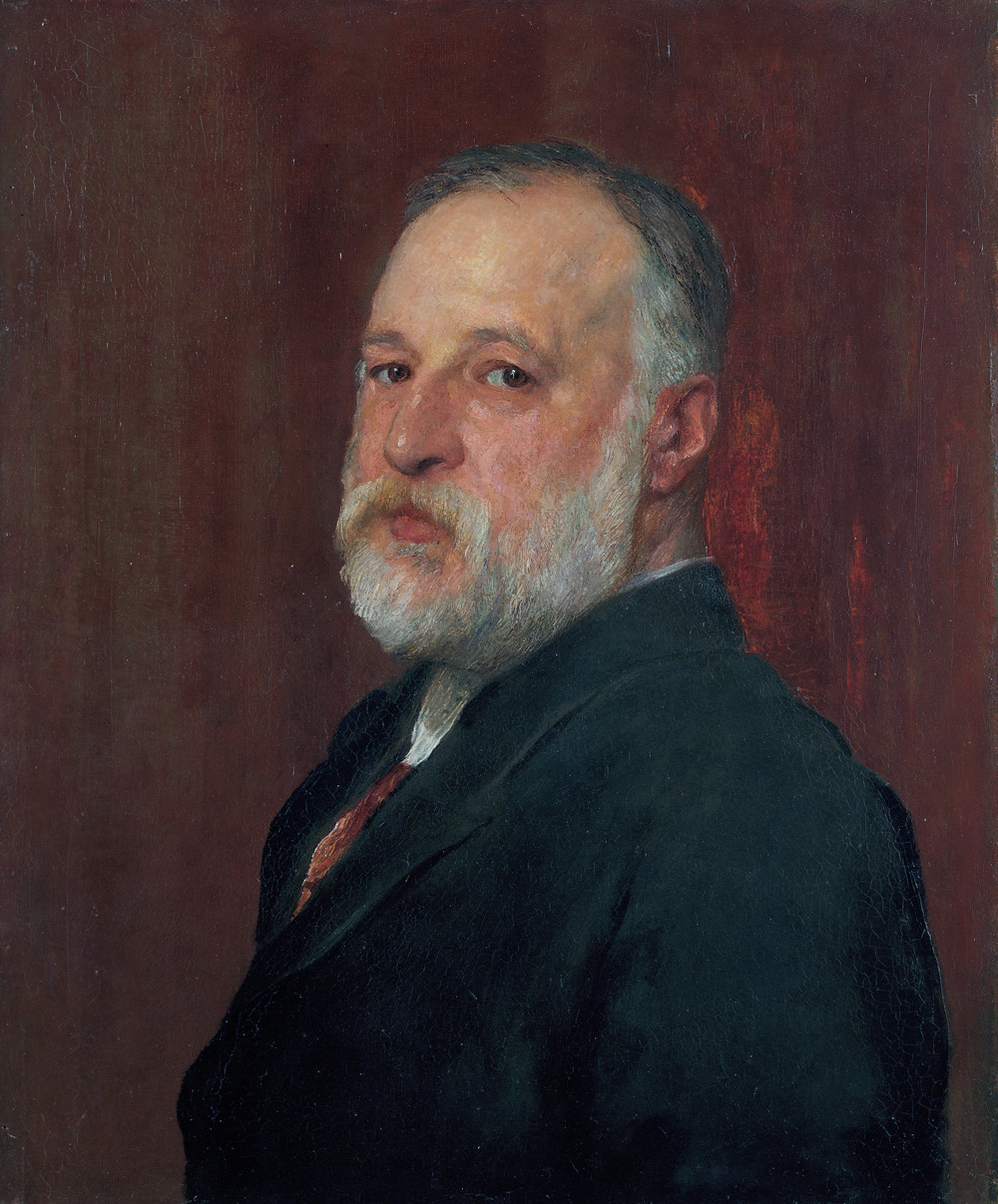
Portrait of Constantine Alexander Ionides by George Frederic Watts

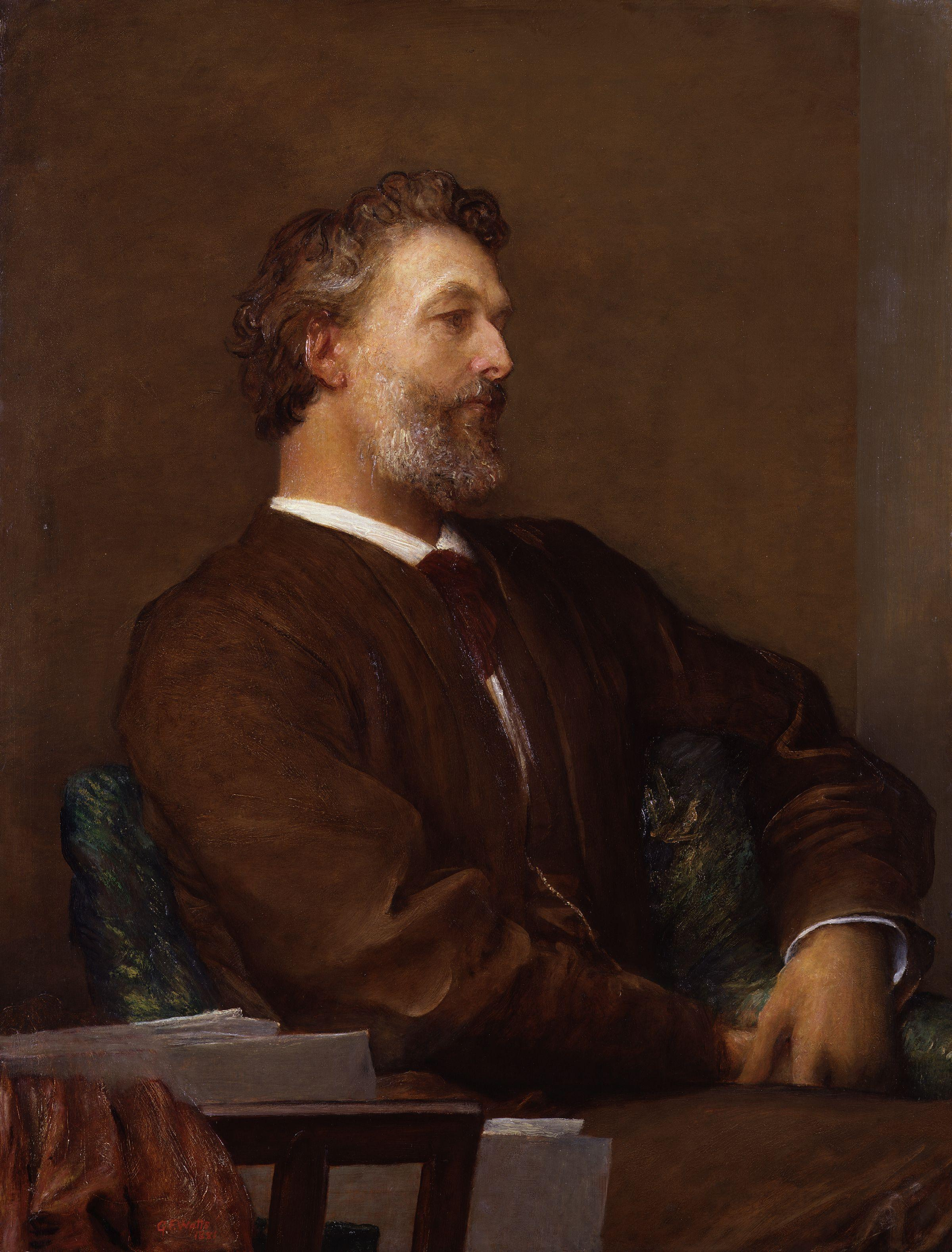
Portrait of Frederic Leighton by George Frederic Watts

Portrait of Joseph Dalton Hooker by John Collier

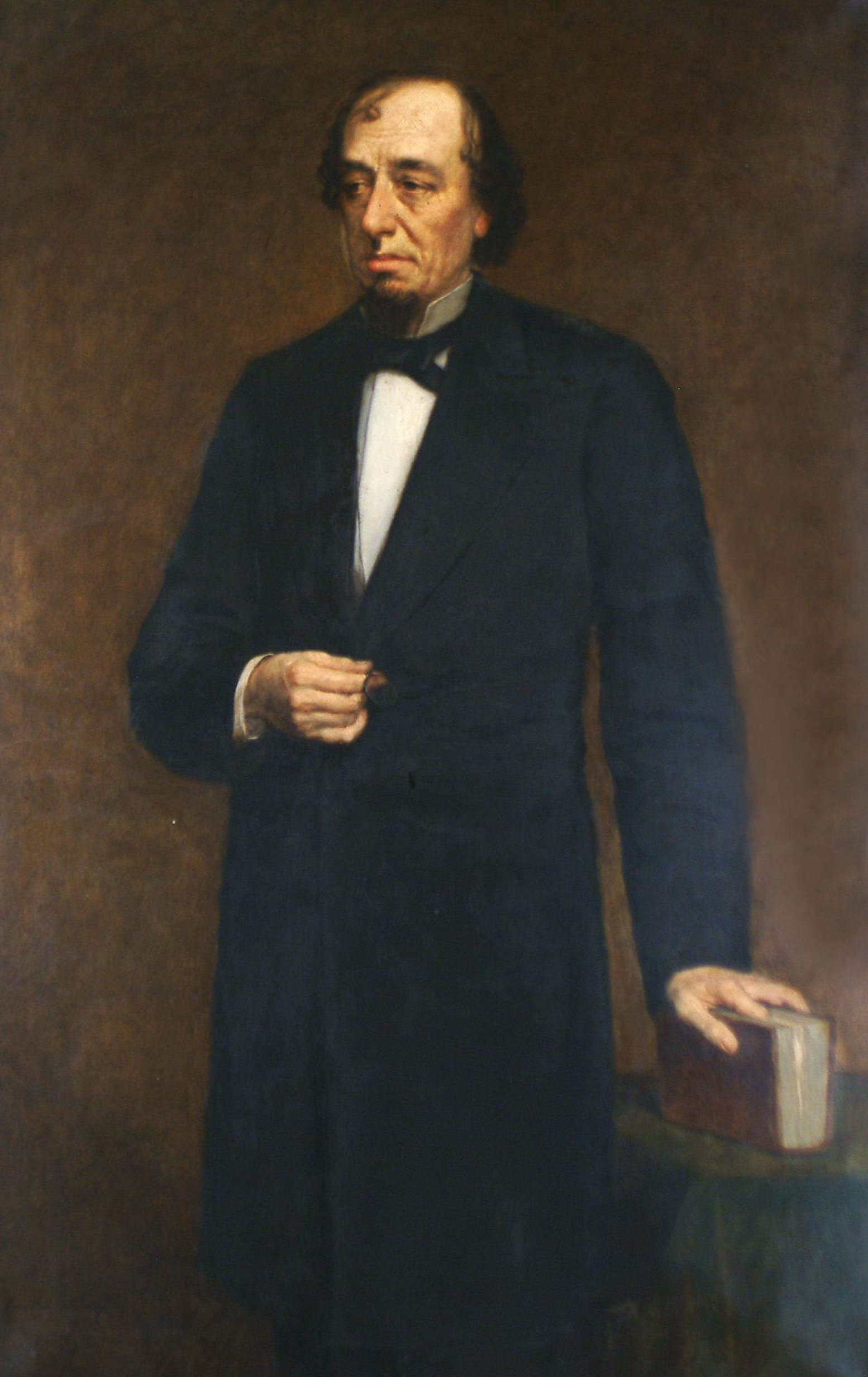
Portrait of Benjamin Disraeli by Pieter Van Havermaet

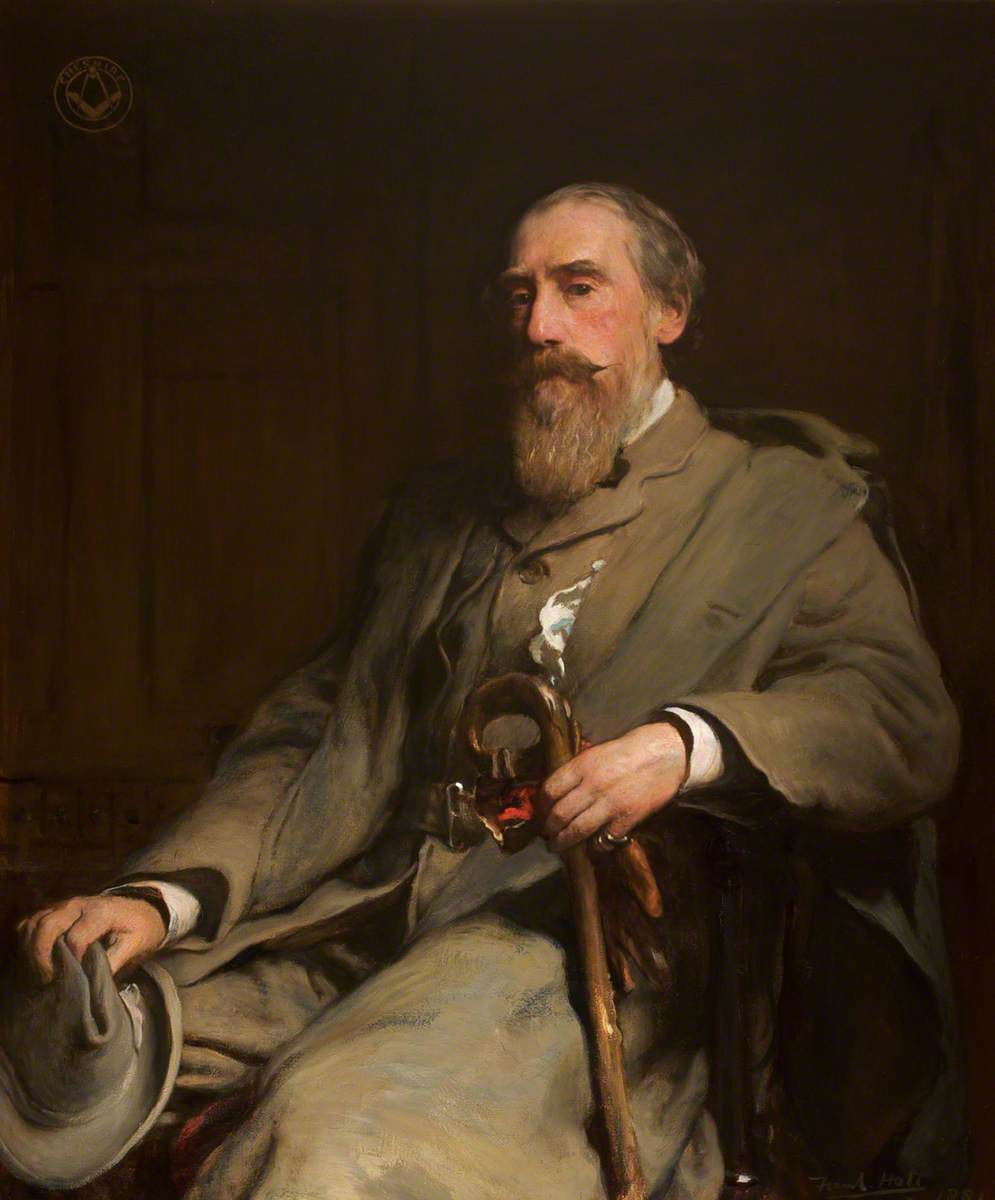
Portrait of Lord de Tabley by Frank Holl

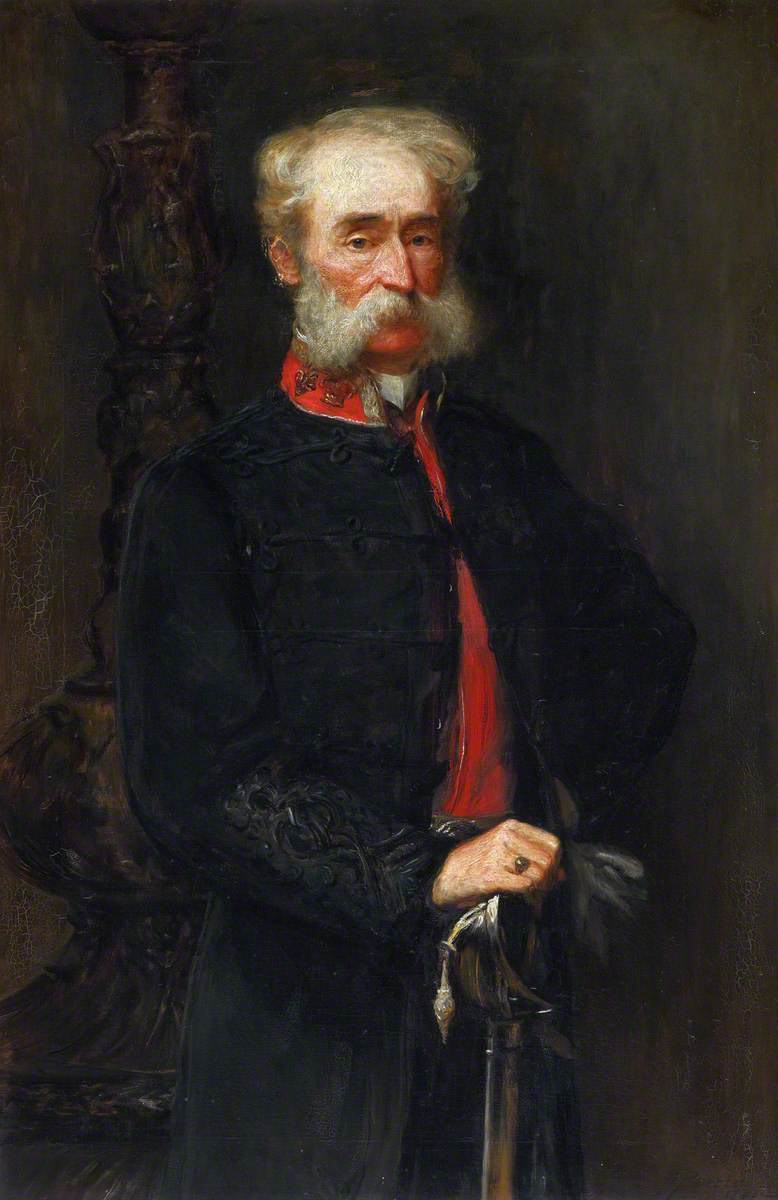
Portrait of John Ballantyne by John Pettie

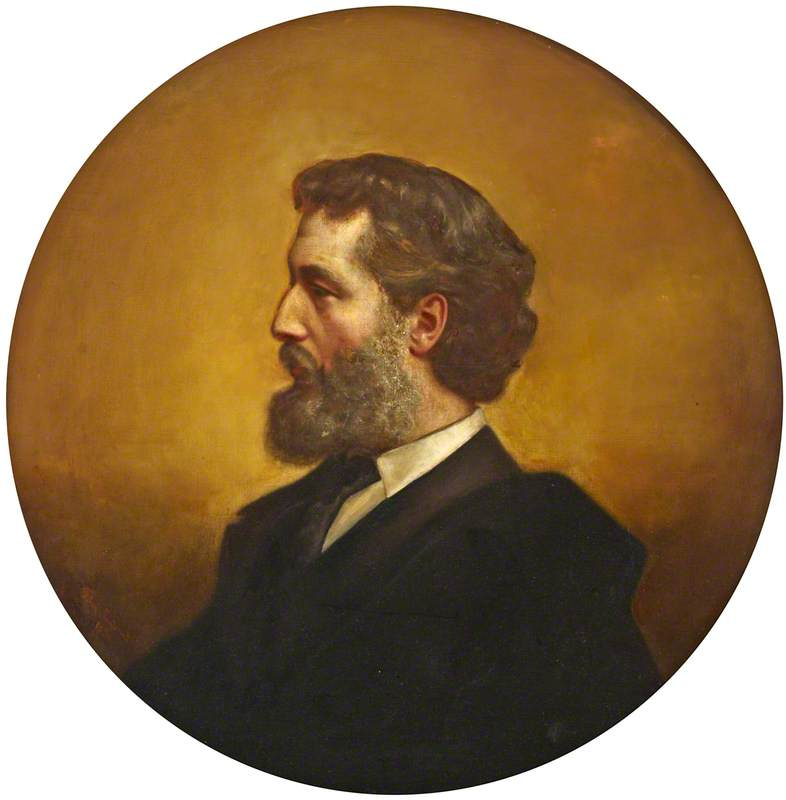
Portrait of Frederic Leighton by Phillipe Félix Dupuis

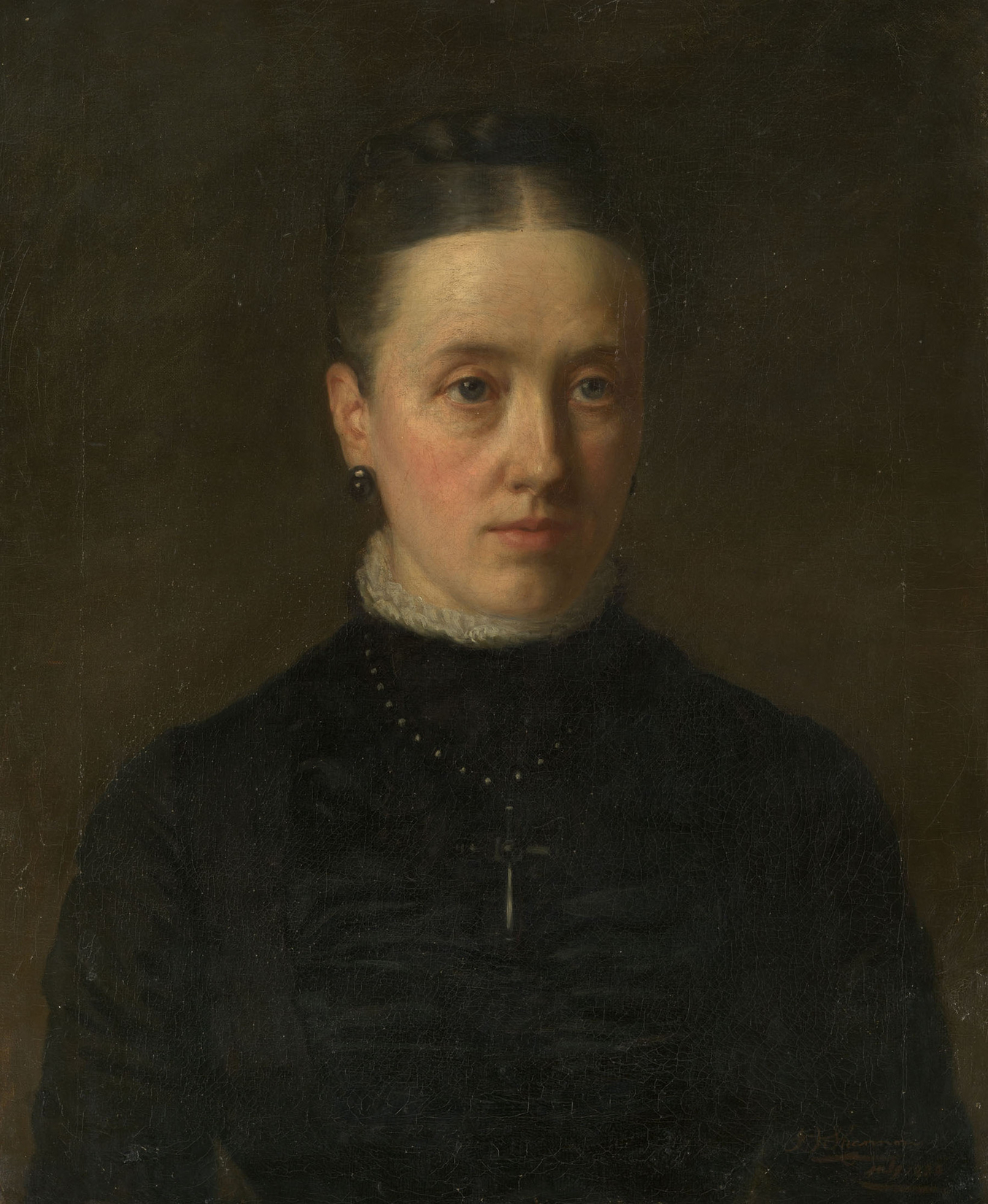
Portrait of Horatia Stopford by James Jebusa Shannon

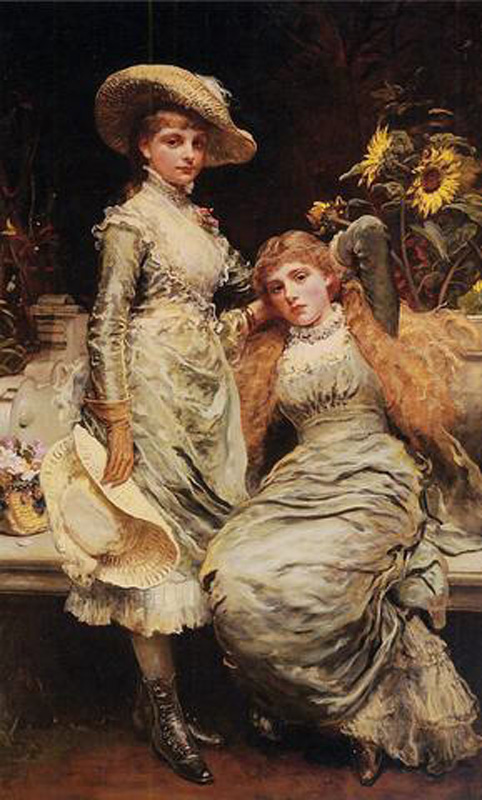
The Misses Wilson by James Sant

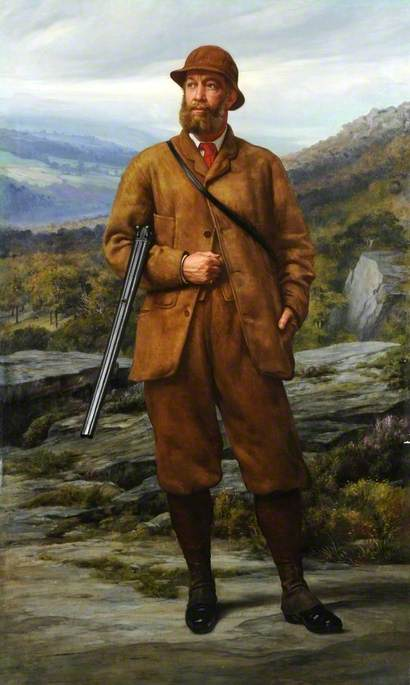
Portrait of the Earl of Wharncliffe by Edward Poynter

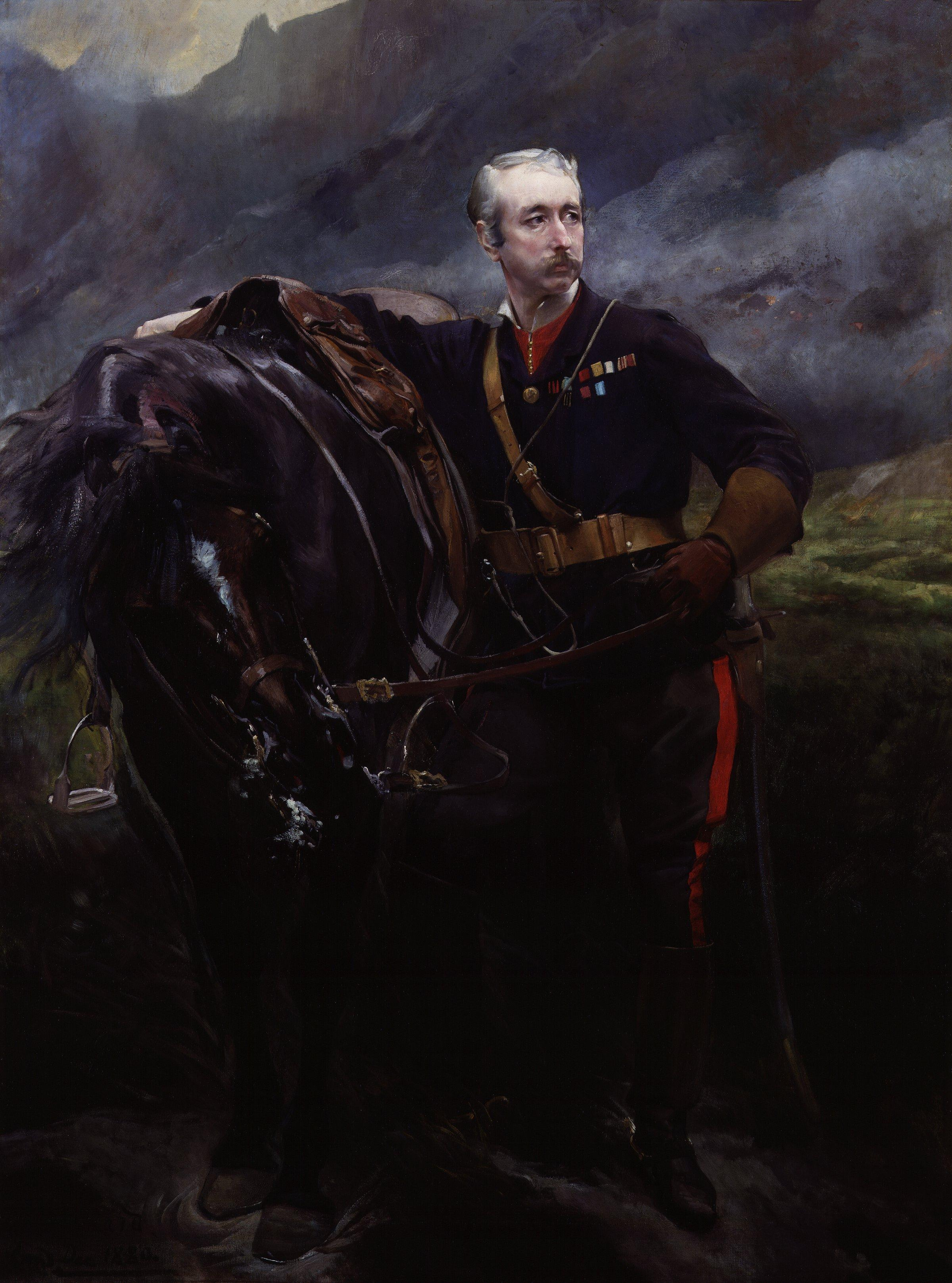
Portrait of Garnet Wolseley by Paul-Albert Besnard

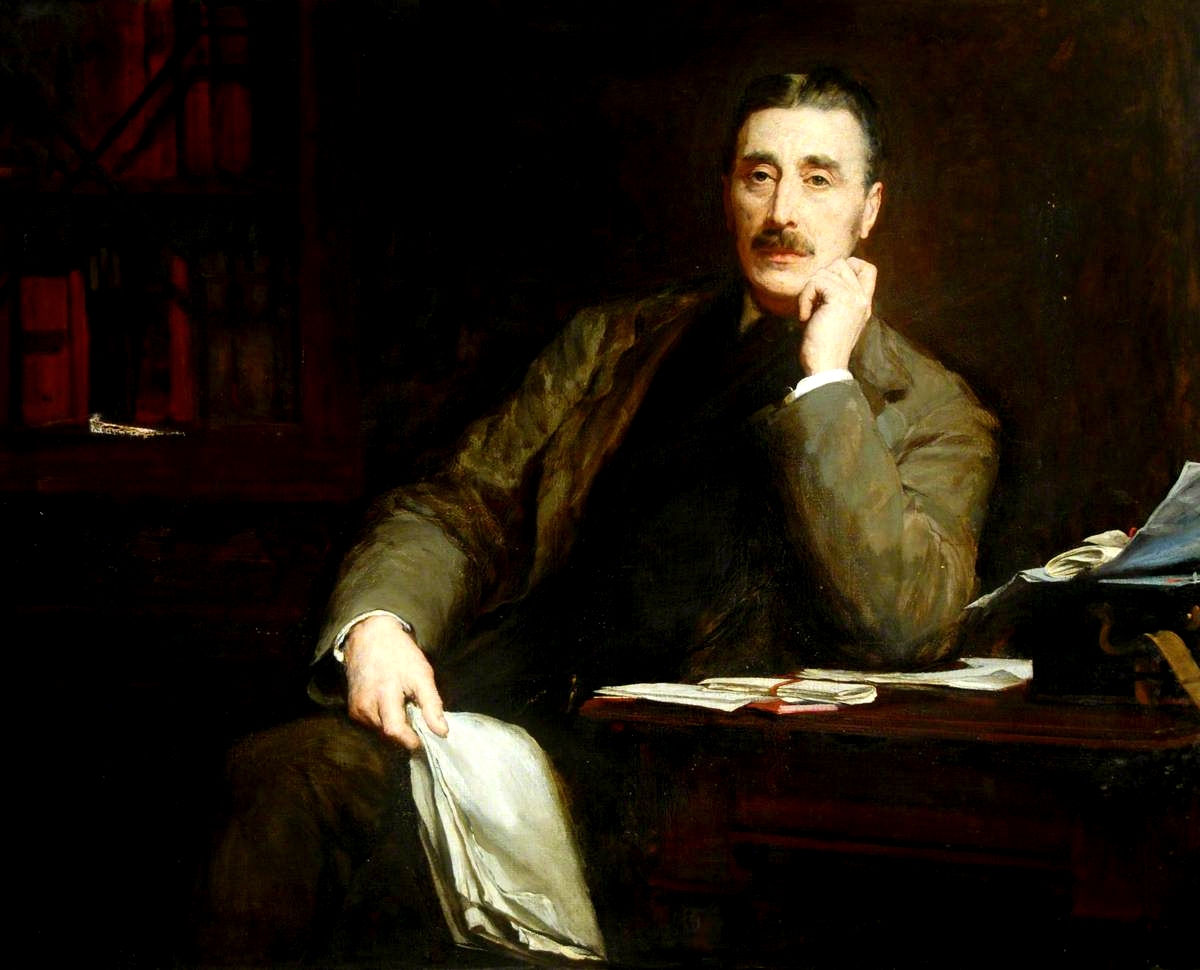
Portrait of David Dale by Walter William Ouless

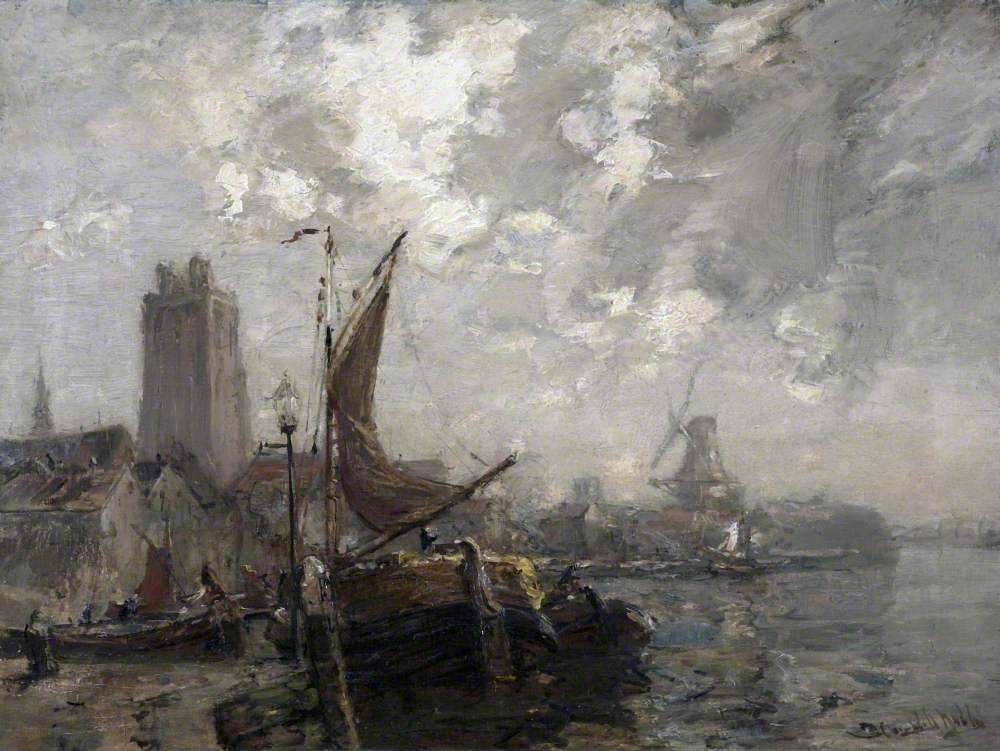
The Old Wharf by James Campbell Noble

Roses and Rabbits by John MacWhirter

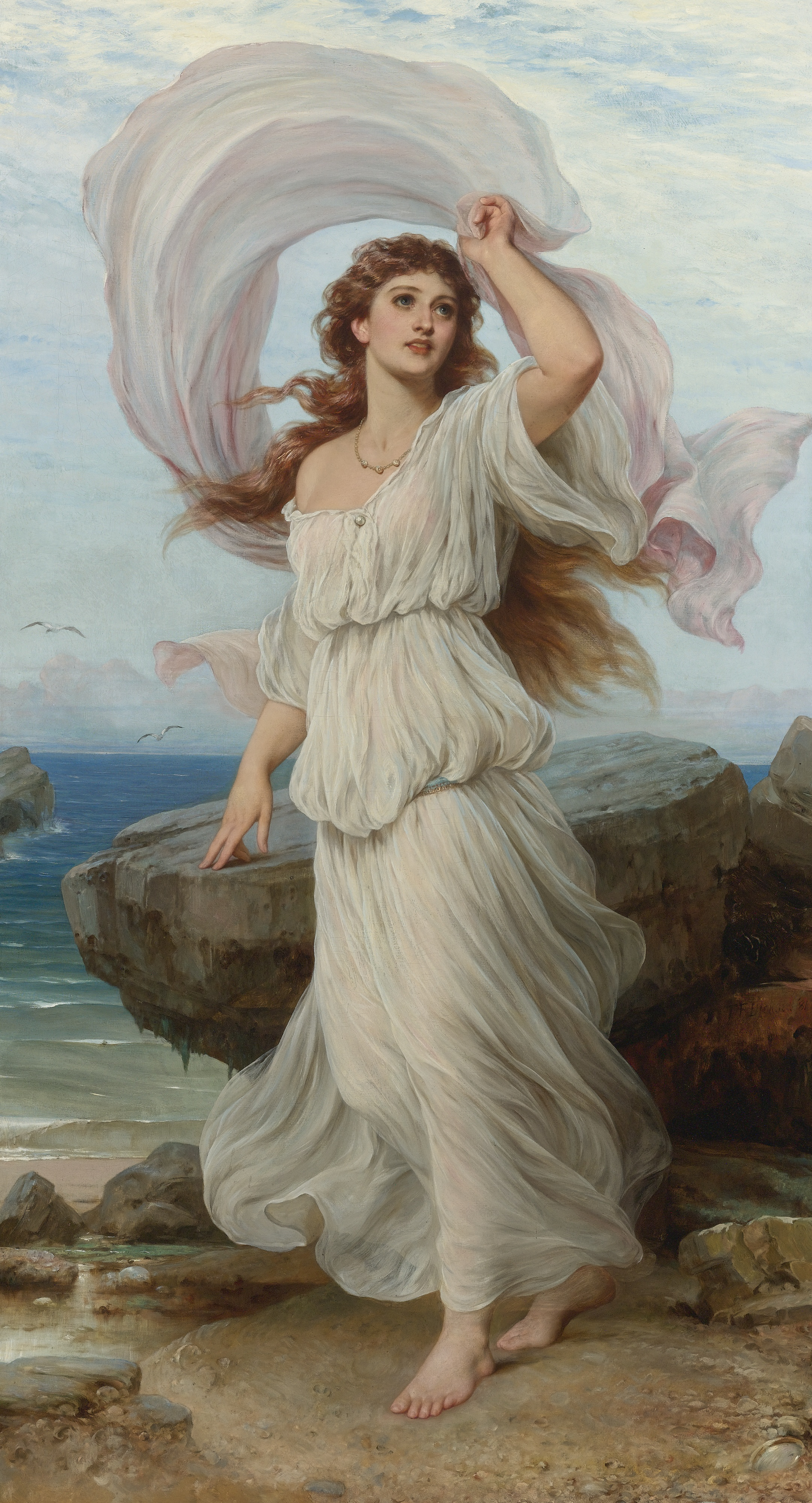
Miranda by Thomas Francis Dicksee

Dolly by Luke Fildes

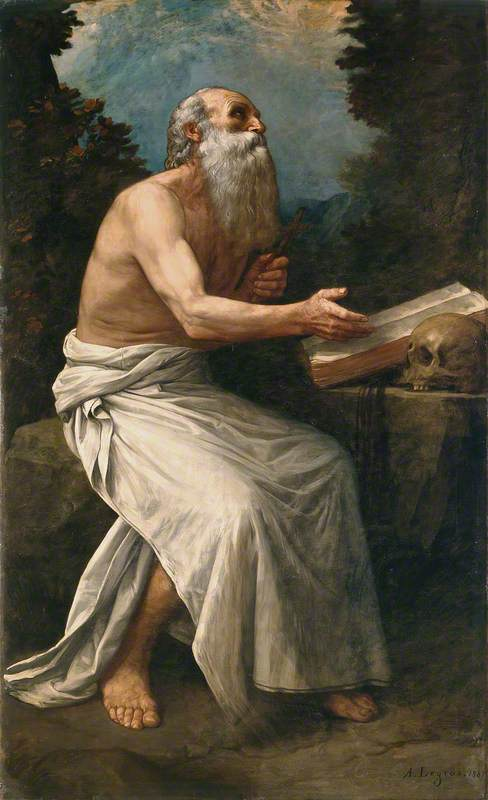
Saint Jerome by Alphonse Legros

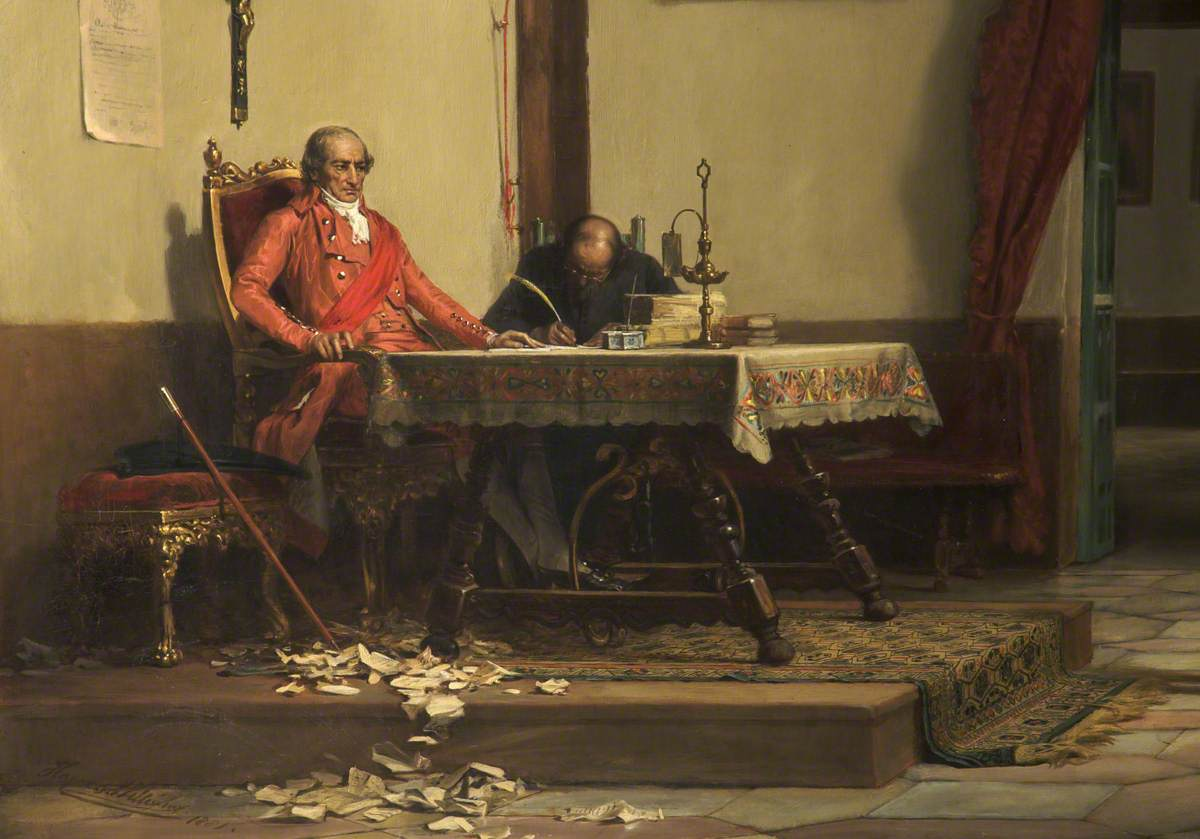
His First Offence by John Haynes-Williams

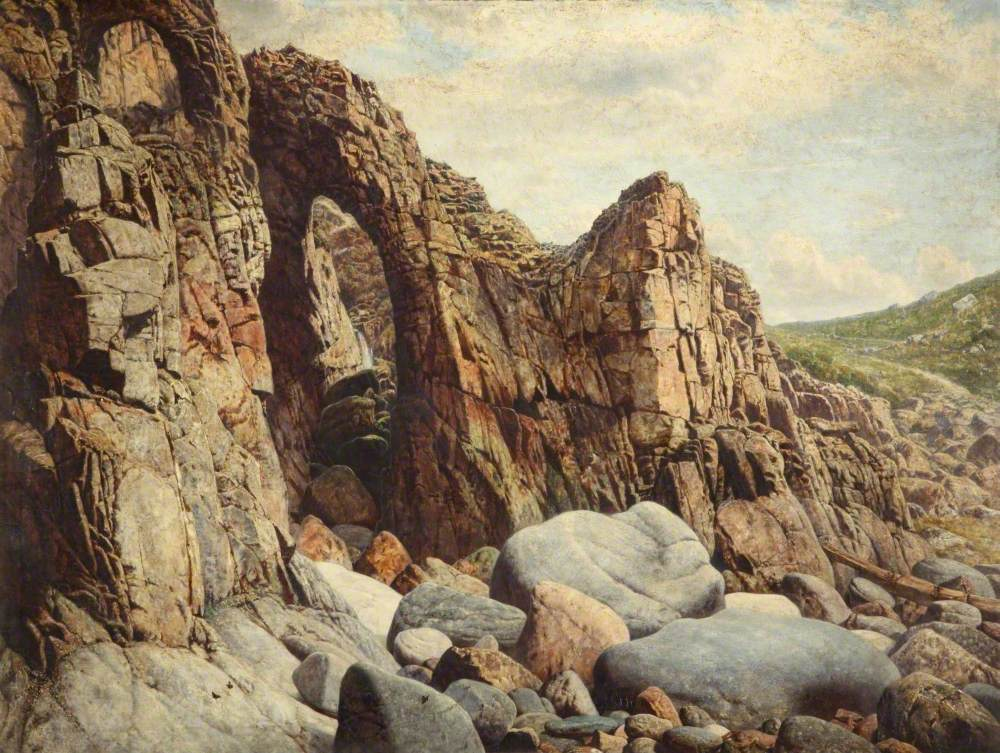
Boulders at Rest by John George Naish

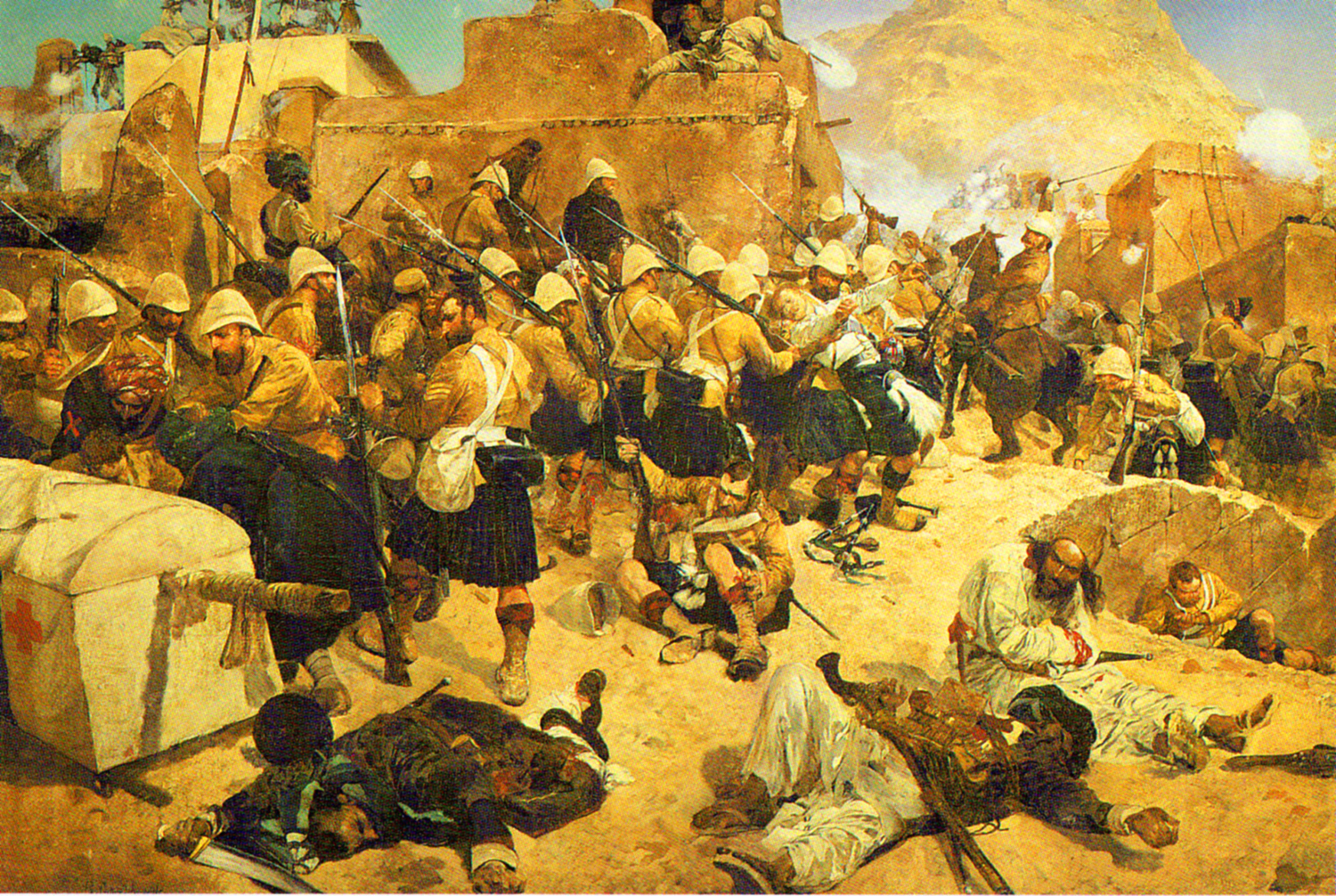
Battle of Kandahar by Richard Caton Woodville

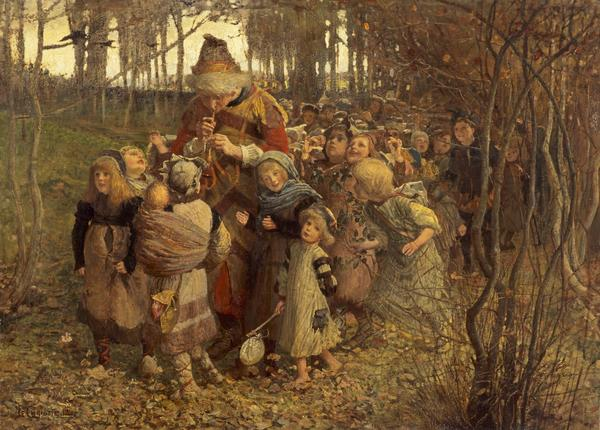
The Pied Piper of Hamelin by James Elder Christie

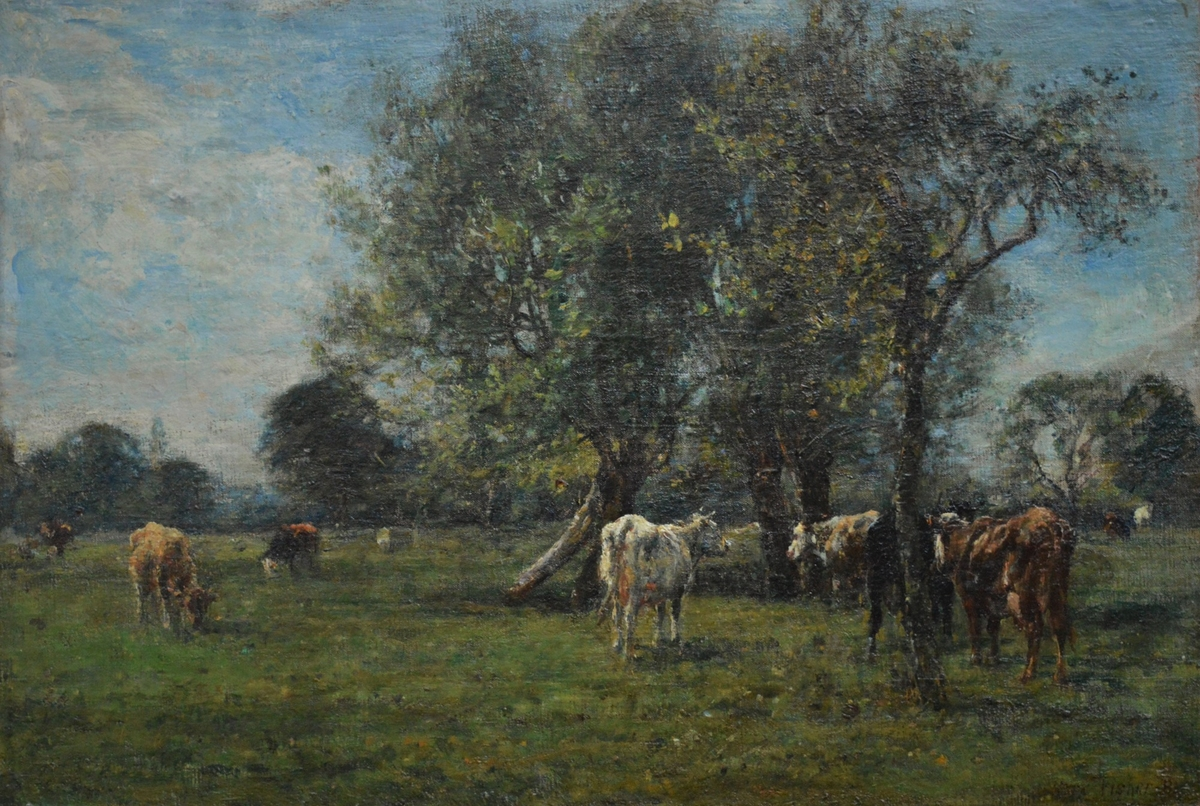
Milking Time by Mark Fisher

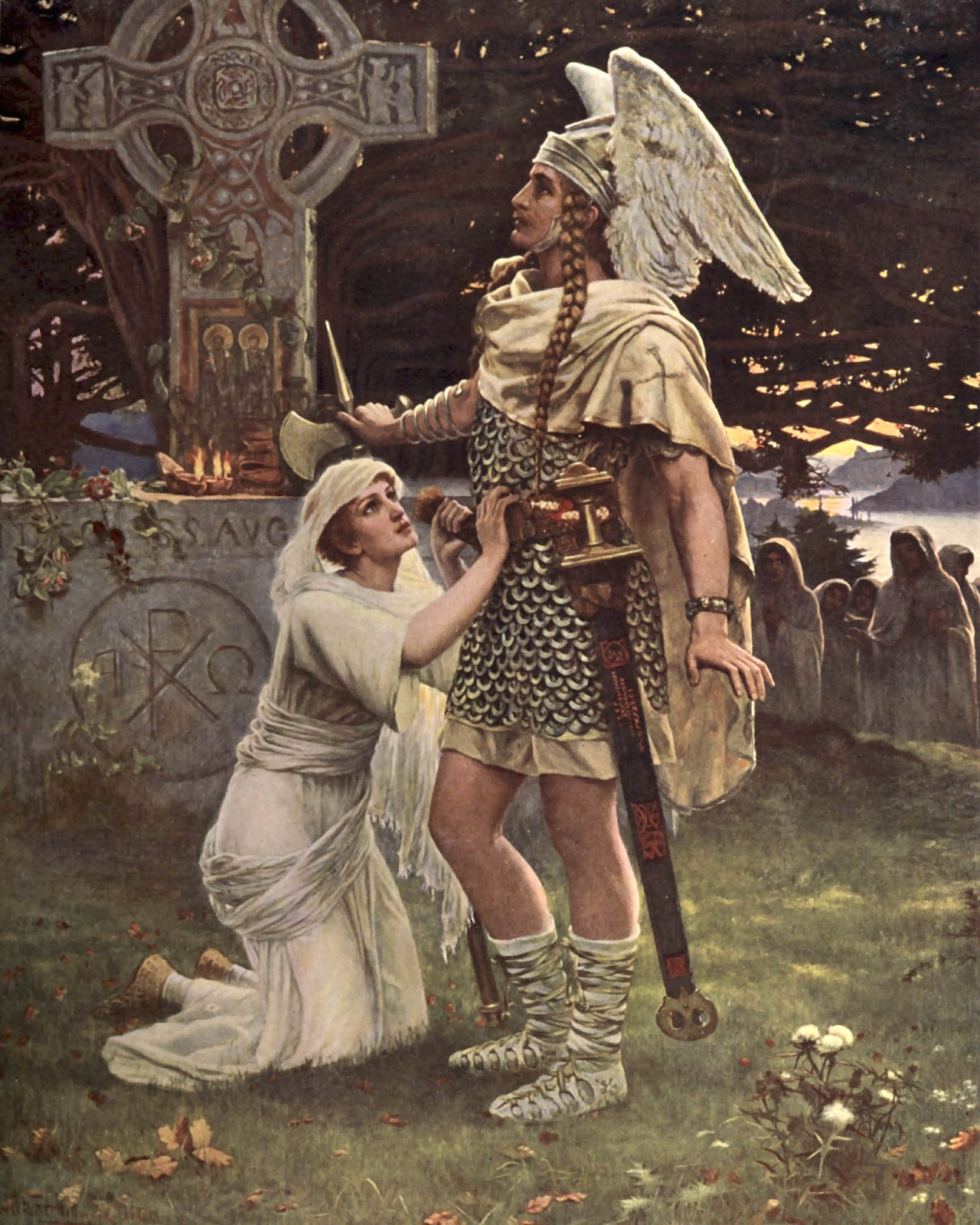
Sir Galahad by Herbert Gustave Schmalz

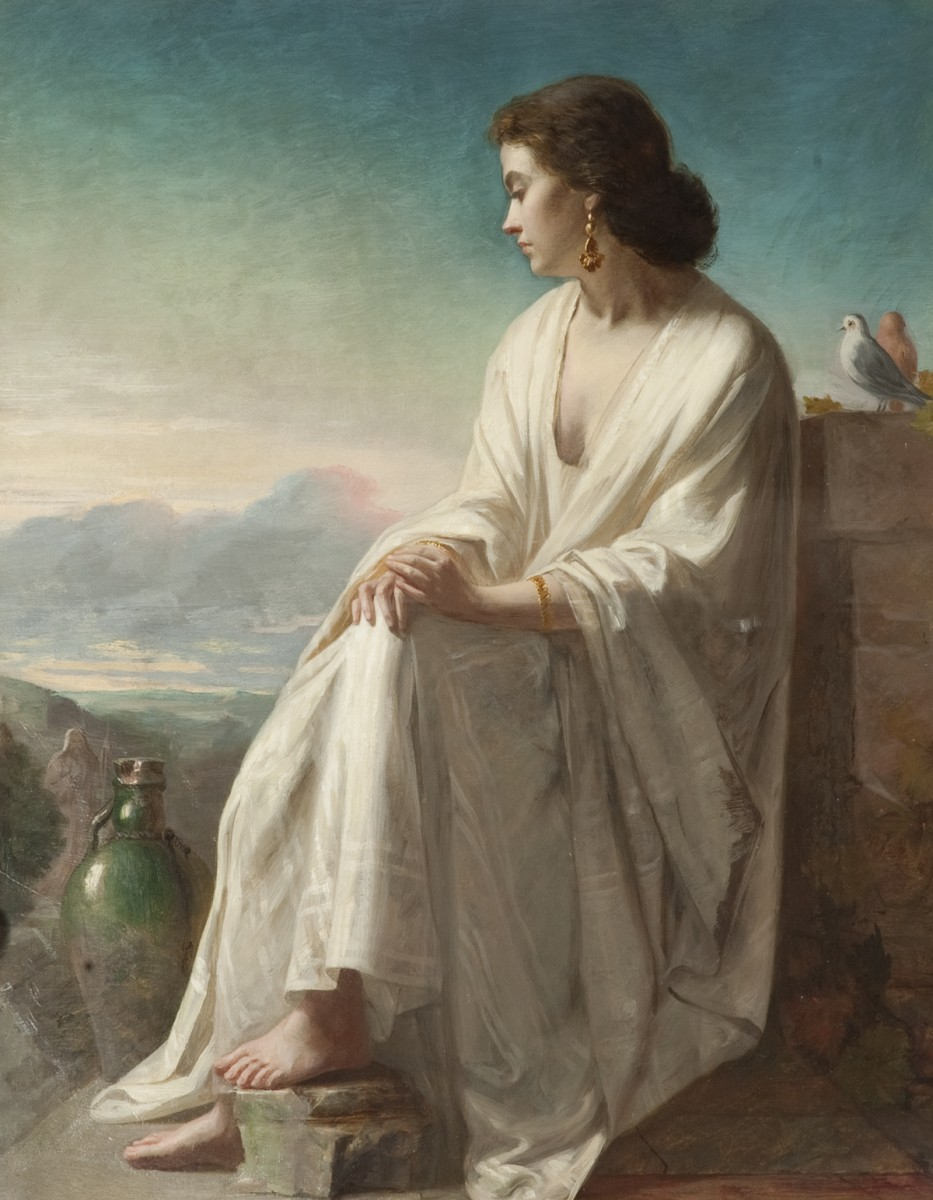
Rebecca at the Well by Frederick Goodall

Little Maud by Edwin Long

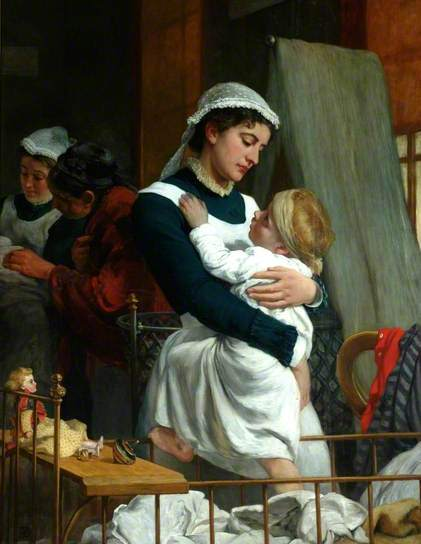
A Star in the East by Thomas Davidson

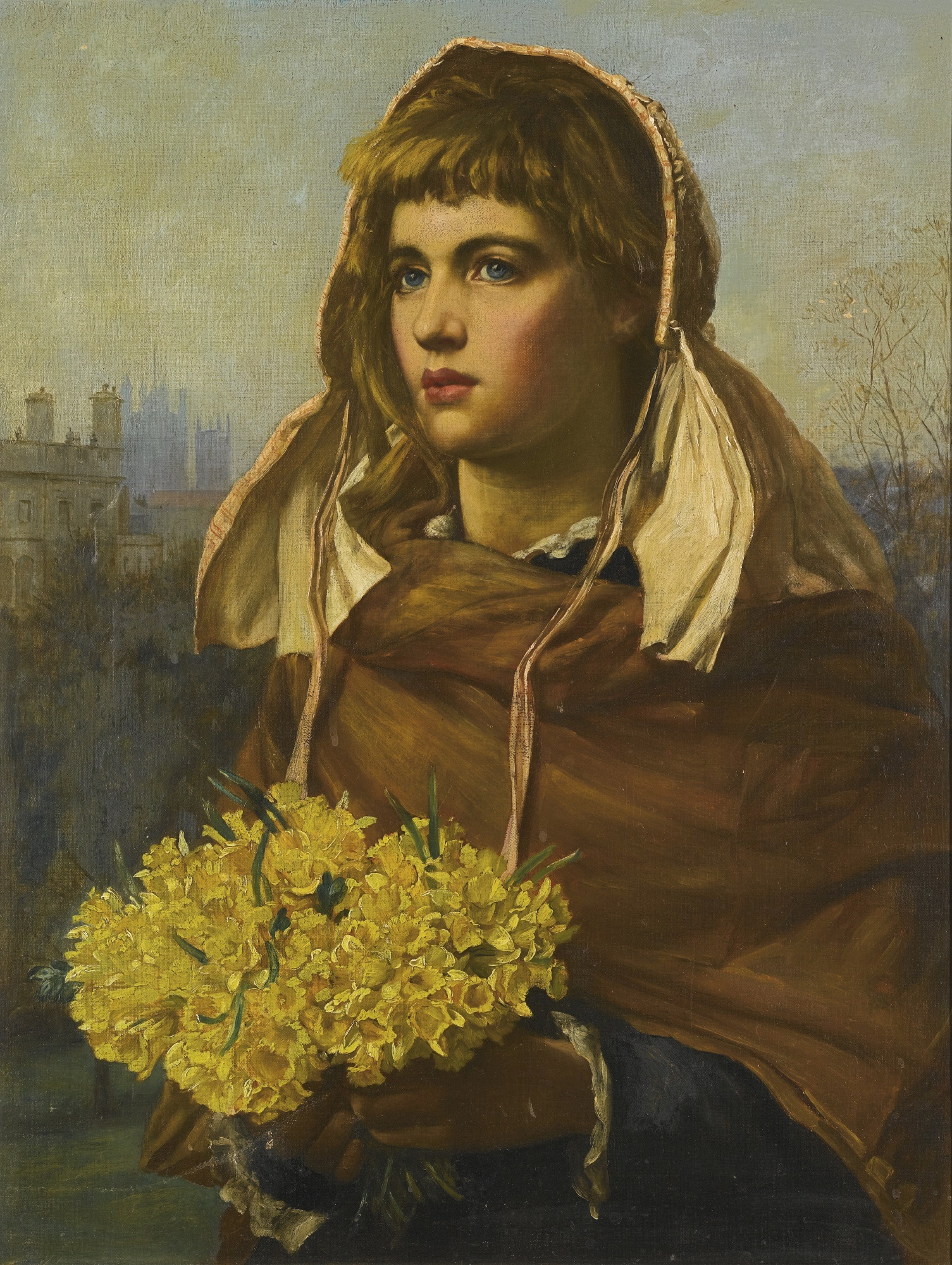
Fresh Flowers from the Country by Valentine Cameron Prinsep

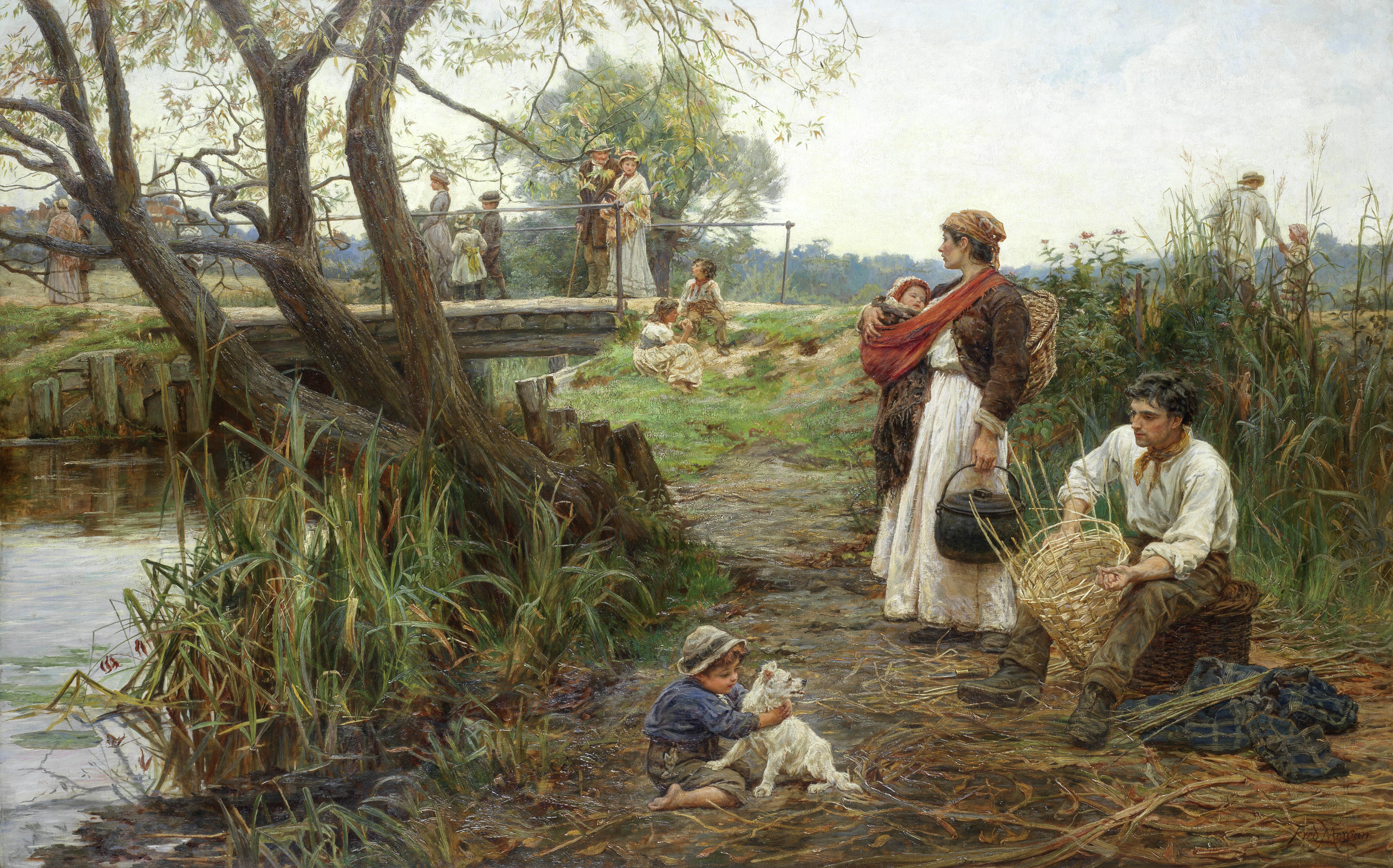
Not of the Fold by Frederick Morgan

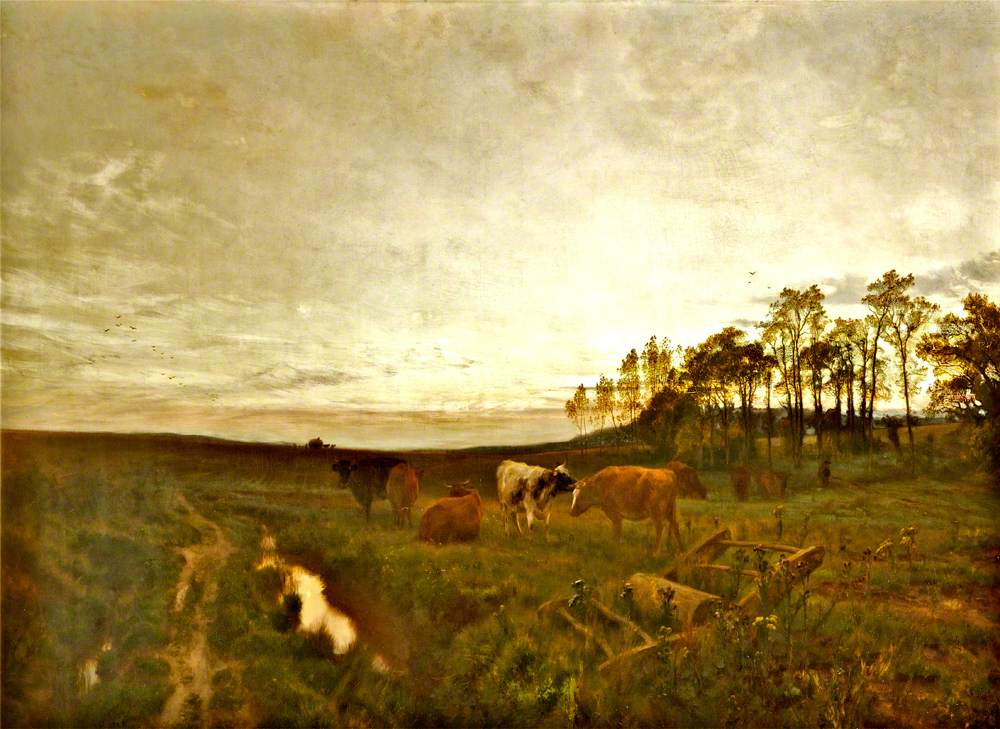
The Evening Star by Henry William Banks Davis

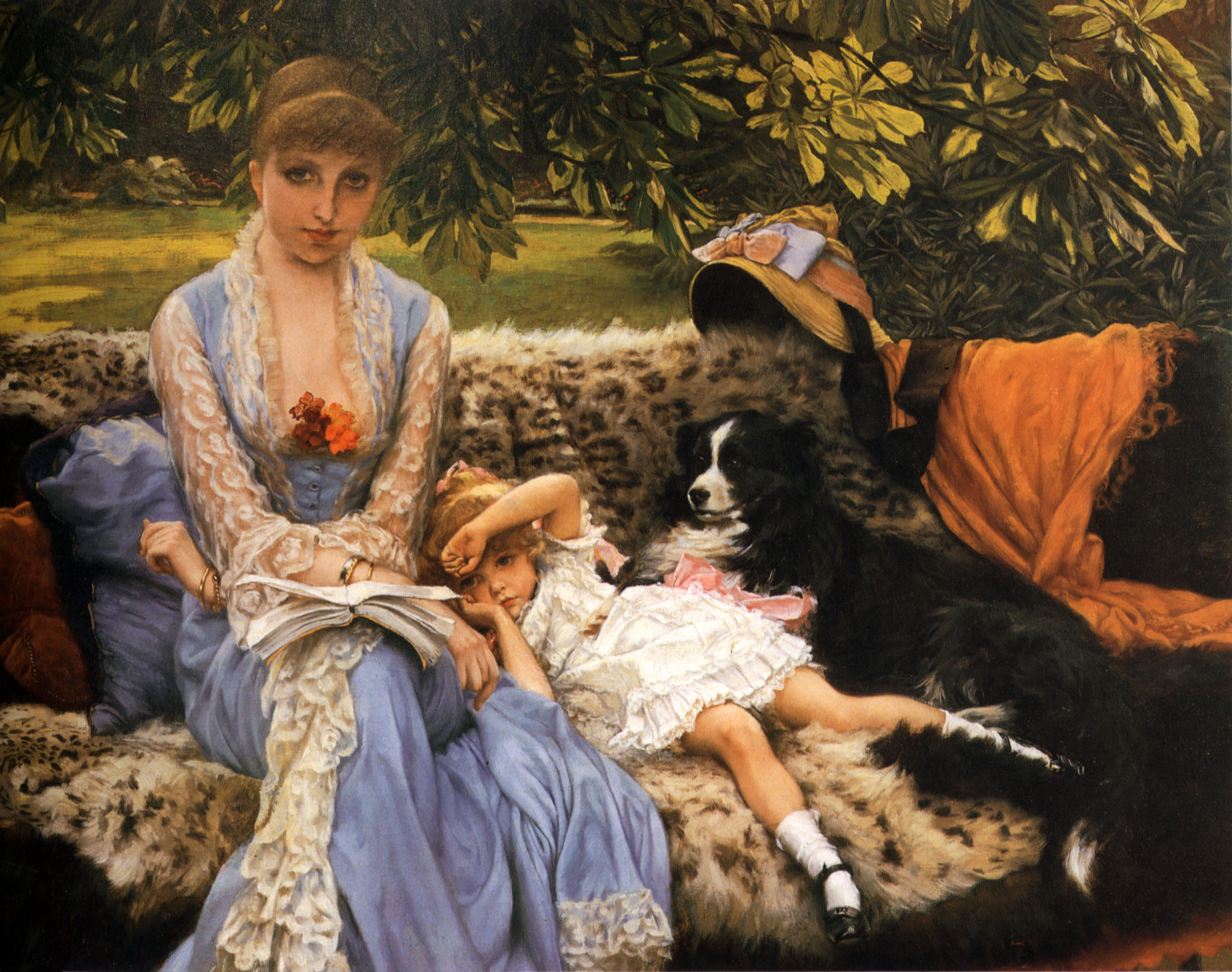
Quiet by James Tissot

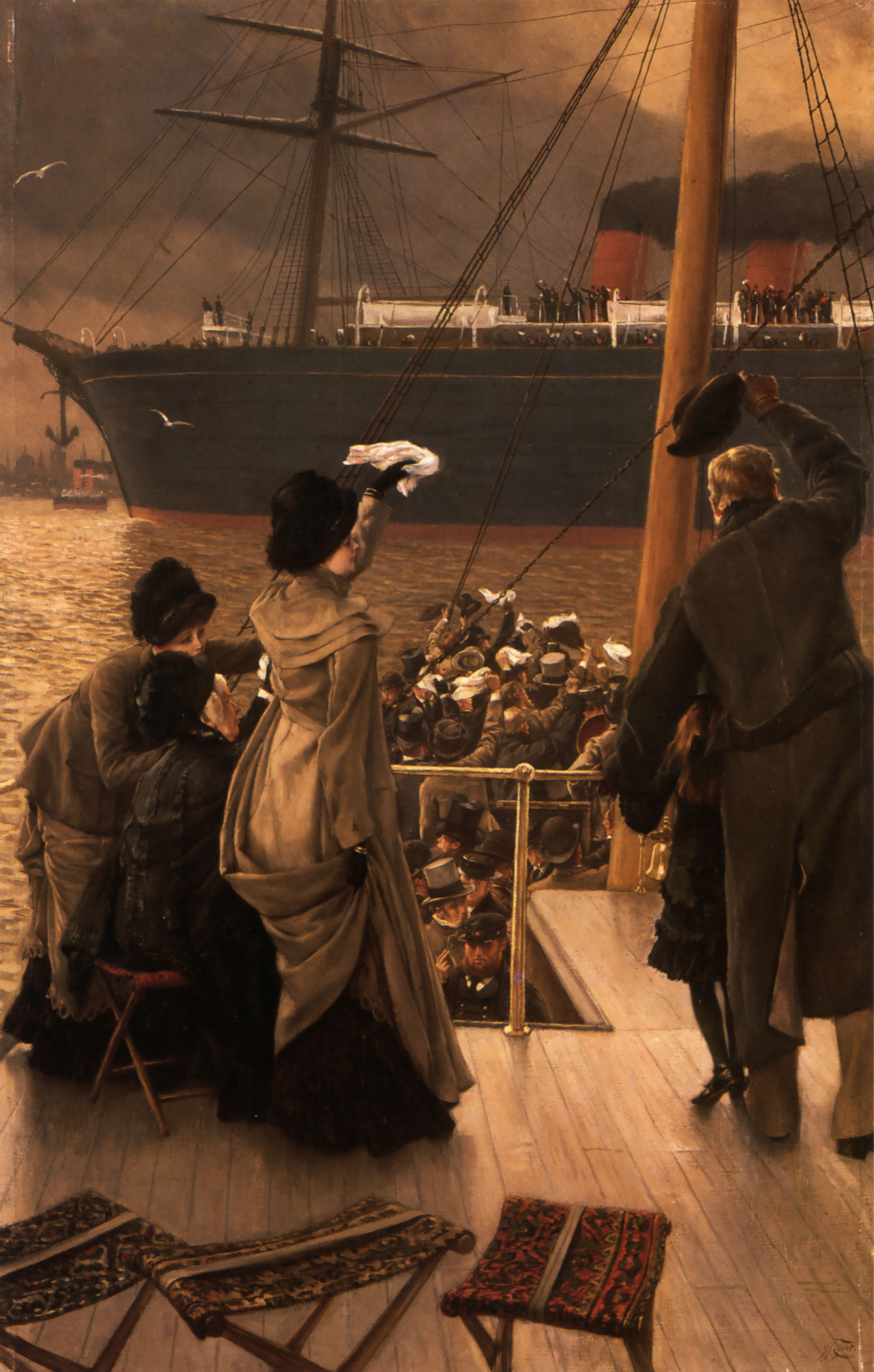
Goodbye on the Mersey by James Tissot

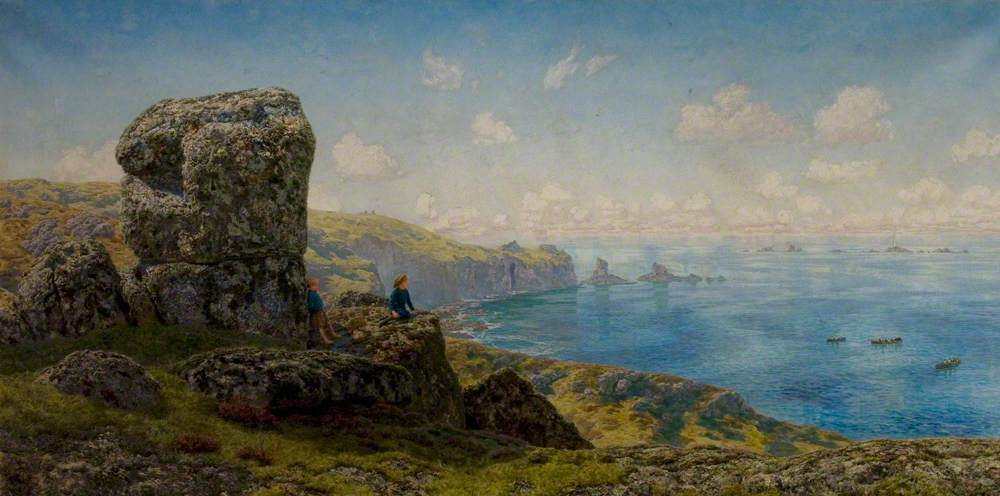
Golden Prospects by John Brett

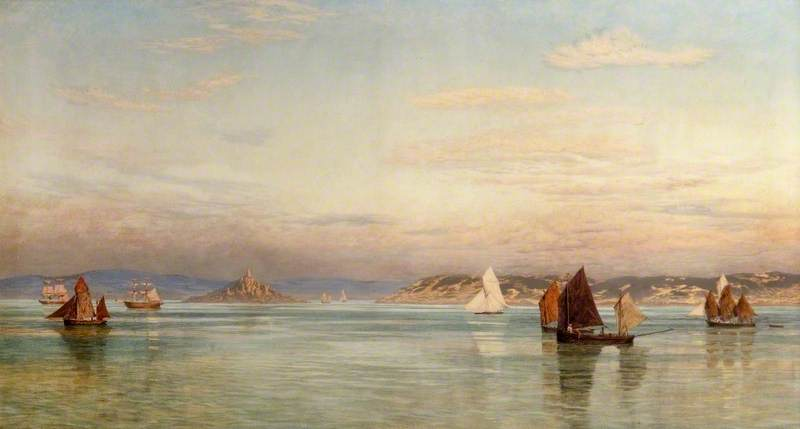
St Ives Bay by John Brett

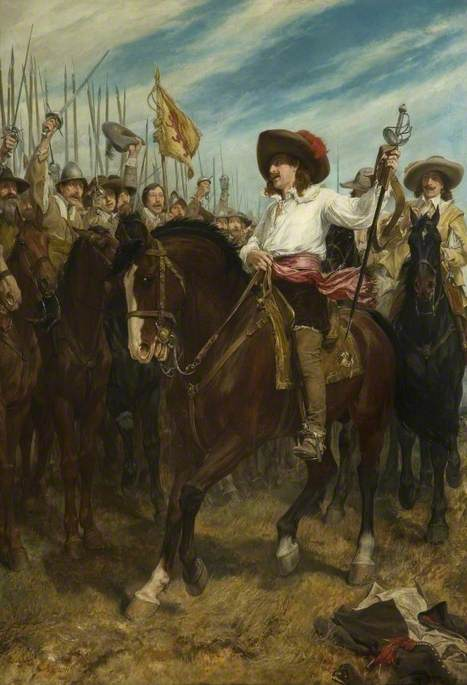
Montrose at Kilsyth by Andrew Carrick Gow

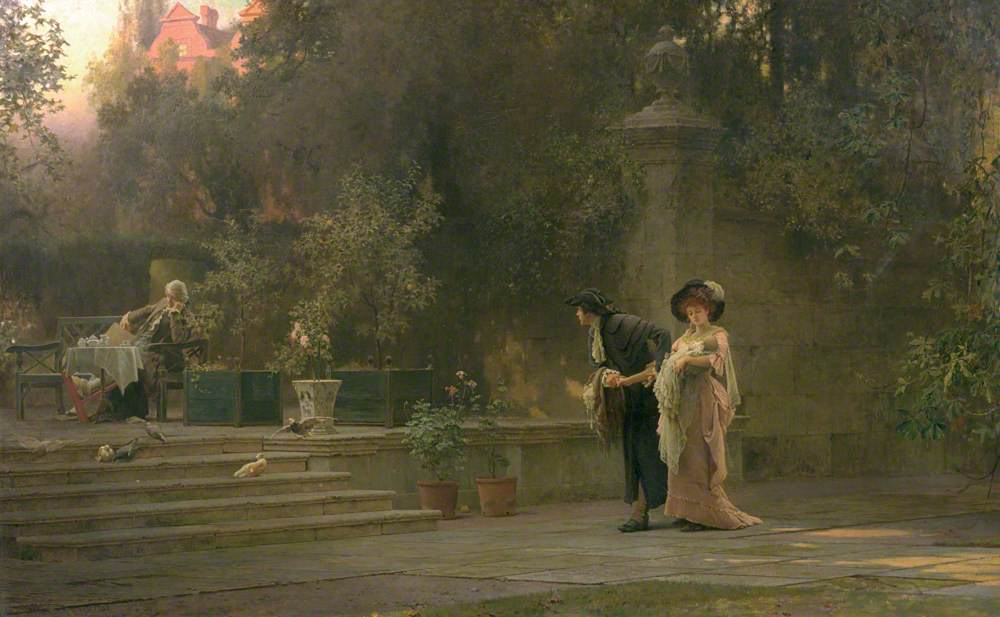
Married for Love by Marcus Stone

== Bibliography ==
- Marshall, Nancy Rose & Warner, Malcolm. James Tissot: Victorian Life, Modern Love. Yale University Press, 1999.
- Ravenscroft, Ruth Jackson & Goldhill, Simon. Victorian Engagements with the Bible and Antiquity: The Shock of the Old. Cambridge University Press, 2023.
- Smith, Alison. The Victorian Nude: Sexuality, Morality, and Art. Manchester University Press, 1996.
