= Burgess (surname) =

Burgess is a surname of English origin, having derived from the French word “Bourgeois” meaning citizen, or freeman of the borough. Notable people with the name include:

== In arts and entertainment ==
=== Actors ===
- Adrienne Burgess, British actress
- Dennis Burgess, British actor
- Dominic Burgess (born 1982), British actor
- Dorothy Burgess (1907–1961), American motion-picture actress
- Keith Burgess, American voice actor
- Neil Burgess (actor) (born 1966), British actor
- Tituss Burgess, American actor

=== In music and dance ===
- Bobby Burgess (born 1941), American dancer and singer
- Casey Burgess (born 1988), Australian television personality, Hi-5
- Colin Burgess (1946–2023), Australian musician
- Emma Burgess, American singer-songwriter
- Grayston Burgess (1932–2019), English countertenor and conductor
- Iain Burgess (1953–2010), British record producer
- John D. Burgess (1934–2005), Scottish bagpiper
- Ken Burgess, British musician
- Leroy Burgess, known as Black Ivory, disco producer
- Lord Burgess (born Irving Burgie, 1924–2019), American songwriter
- Mark Burgess (musician) (born 1960), lead singer of British band The Chameleons
- Norine Burgess, Canadian singer
- Rosie Burgess (born 1978), Australian musician
- Sally Burgess (born 1953), British mezzo-soprano
- Sharna Burgess (born 1985), Australian dancer on Dancing with the Stars (US)
- Sonny Burgess (1931–2017), rockabilly musician
- Tim Burgess (musician) (born 1967), lead singer of British band The Charlatans (English band)
- Wilma Burgess (1939–2003), American country music singer

=== Writers ===
- Alan Burgess (1915–1998), English author
- Anthony Burgess (1917–1993), English novelist and critic
- Gelett Burgess (1866–1951), U.S. humorist
- Geoffrey Burgess, British writer
- Haldane Burgess (1862–1927), Shetland writer
- James Bland Burgess (1752–1824), English writer and politician
- Melvin Burgess (born 1954), British author
- Mitchell Burgess, American television writer
- Thornton Burgess (1874–1965), U.S. conservationist and children's author

=== In other arts ===
- Bruce Burgess, British documentary filmmaker
- Eliza Mary Burgess, English artist
- Gregory Burgess, Australian architect
- Henry William Burgess, English artist
- Ida Josephine Burgess, American artist
- Janice Burgess (1952–2024), American television producer
- Lowry Burgess, American artist
- Neil Burgess (comedian) (1846–1910), American vaudeville comedian

== In government and politics ==
=== Britain/UK ===
- Ariane Burgess (born 1965), Scottish politician
- Claude Bramall Burgess (died 1998), British Colonial Secretary of Hong Kong from 1958–1963
- Guy Burgess (1911–1963), British double-agent
- James Bland Burgess (1752–1824), English writer and politician
- Joseph Burgess (1853–1934), British politician
- Margaret Burgess (born 1949), Scottish politician
- Stanley Burgess (1889–1972), British politician

=== United States ===
- Brian L. Burgess, an associate justice of the Vermont Supreme Court
- Frank Burgess (1935–2010), American basketball player and federal judge
- H. S. Burgess (1866–1952), American politician
- Isabel Burgess (1912–1999), American politician
- Lathrop Burgess, American politician
- Stephanie Burgess, American politician
- Tammy Schmersal-Burgess, American politician from Maine
- Tim Burgess (Seattle), member of the Seattle City Council

=== Other nations ===
- Cathal Brugha (Charles William St. John Burgess), Irish nationalist and politician, active in the Anglo-Irish War and the Irish Civil War (1874–1922)
- Henry Givens Burgess (1859–1937), Irish politician
- Ken Burgess (died 2005), Canadian politician
- Neale Burgess (born 1956), Australian politician

== In science ==
- Charles Frederick Burgess (1873–1945), American chemist
- Edward Sandford Burgess (1855–1928), American botanist (abbrev. E.S.Burgess)
- Eric Burgess (1920–2005), freelance space consultant
- Ernest Burgess (1886–1966), urban sociologist at the University of Chicago
- George H. Burgess (born December 25, 1949), ichthyologist and fisheries biologist
- Neil Burgess (neuroscientist) (* 1966), British neuroscientist
- Warren E. Burgess, ichthyologist

== In sport ==
=== Aquatic sports ===
- Edgar Burgess (1891–1952), English Olympic rower
- Greg Burgess (born 1972), American swimmer
- Nigel Burgess (1942–1992), British yachtsman
- Reuben Burgess (born 1966), British canoeist

=== Association football ===
- Andy Burgess (footballer) (born 1981), English footballer
- Ben Burgess (born 1981), English-born footballer
- Cam Burgess (1919–1978), English footballer
- Charlie Burgess (1883–1956), English footballer
- Christian Burgess (born 1991), English footballer
- Daryl Burgess (born 1971), English footballer
- Herbert Burgess (1883–1954), English football player
- Joanne Burgess (born 1979), Australian footballer
- Kevin Burgess (footballer) (born 1988), British footballer
- Mac Burgess, English football manager
- Nigel Burgess (born 1981), Bermudan footballer
- Oliver Burgess (born 1981), English footballer
- Romelle Burgess (born 1982), Barbadian footballer
- Stuart Burgess (born 1962), Scottish footballer
- Tyrell Burgess (born 1986), Bermudan footballer

=== Basketball ===
- Chris Burgess (born 1979), American basketball player
- Franklin D. Burgess (1935–2010), American basketball player and federal judge
- Pete Burgess (born 1984), New Zealand basketball player

=== Gridiron football ===
- Derrick Burgess, American football player, NFL defensive end for the New England Patriots
- Prescott Burgess (born 1984), American football linebacker
- Rodney Burgess (born 1984), American football player
- Ronnie Burgess (1963–2021), American football player
- Rudy Burgess (born 1984), American football player
- Terrell Burgess (born 1997), American football player

=== Rugby ===
- Clive Burgess (1950–2006), Welsh rugby union footballer
- Greg Burgess (rugby union) (born 1954), New Zealand rugby union player
- Liza Burgess (born 1964), Welsh rugby union player
- Sam Burgess (born 1988), English Rugby League player

=== Other sports ===
- Bryan Burgess, Canadian curler
- Charlotte Burgess (born 1987), British archer
- Erika Burgess (born 1984), New Zealand netball player
- Gordon Burgess, New Zealand cricket player
- Graham Burgess (cricketer) (born 1943), English cricketer
- Ian Burgess (1930–2012), British Formula One driver
- Jeremy Burgess (born 1953), Australian motorcycle racing engineer
- Lauren Burgess (born 1986), New Zealand netball player
- Reg Burgess (born 1934), Australian rules footballer
- Shayne Burgess (1964), English darts player
- Smoky Burgess (1927–1991), American Major League Baseball player

== In other fields ==
- Abbie Burgess (1839–1892), American lighthouse-keeper
- Albert Franklin Burgess (1873–1953), American entomologist
- Anthony Joseph Burgess (1938–2013), Australian-born Papua New Guinean Roman Catholic bishop
- Graham Burgess (born 1968), English chess master
- Joseph Henry Burgess (1947–2009), American murderer
- Josiah Burgess, 18th-century pirate captain
- Martin Burgess (born 1931), English clockmaker
- Samuel Burgess, 17th-century pirate captain
- Thornton Burgess (1874–1965), U.S. conservationist and children's author
- Timothy Mark Burgess (born 1956), American lawyer
- Warren Randolph Burgess (1889–1978), American banker and diplomat

== Names shared by multiple people ==
- Colin Burgess (disambiguation)
- Daniel Burgess (disambiguation)
- David Burgess (disambiguation)
- Don Burgess (disambiguation)
- Edward Burgess (disambiguation)
- George Burgess (disambiguation)
- Harry Burgess (disambiguation)
- Jim Burgess (disambiguation)
- John Burgess (disambiguation)
- Luke Burgess (disambiguation)
- Mark Burgess (disambiguation)
- Michael Burgess (disambiguation)
- Paul Burgess (disambiguation)
- Richard Burgess (disambiguation)
- Robert Burgess (disambiguation)
- Ron Burgess (disambiguation)
- Sarah Burgess (disambiguation)
- Thomas Burgess (disambiguation)
- William Burgess (disambiguation)

== Fictional characters ==
- Alex Burgess, fictional character from Neil Gaiman's comic book series, The Sandman
- Grace Burgess, fictional character from BBC's Peaky Blinders TV series.
- Jesus Burgess, fictional character from Eiichiro Oda's manga, One Piece.

== See also ==
- Burges, a surname
- Borges
