= Henry William Burgess =

English landscape painter

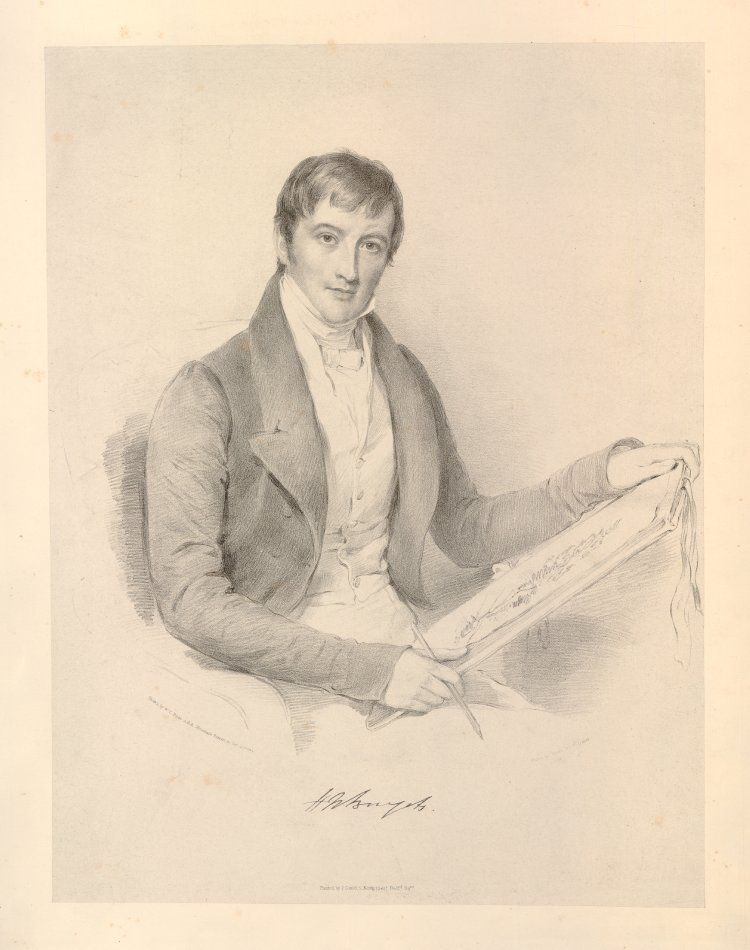
- Portrait of Henry William Burgess as a young man; after Sir William Charles Ross. Lithograph on chine collé.
- Born: c. 1792
- Died: 8 May 1839
- Children: John Bagnold Burgess
- Father: William Burgess
- Relatives: Thomas Burgess (grandfather); John Cart Burgess (brother); Thomas Burgess (brother)

Henry William Burgess (c. 1792–1839/40) was a British artist known particularly for his drawings of trees and landscapes. His media were graphite and watercolour.

== Early life and education ==
He was part of the a well-known dynasty of painters who flourished in the 18th and 19th centuries. His father was the portrait-painter William Burgess (1749–1812), and his grandfather was Thomas Burgess (fl. 1766–1786). His brothers were the painters John Cart Burgess and Thomas Burgess. His son John-Bagnold Burgess (1830–1897) also became a successful painter.

== Art ==
Based in Chelsea, like the rest of his family, Burgess exhibited many works at the Royal Academy between 1809 and 1839, the Suffolk Street Gallery, and the New Water-Colour Society in London.

He became landscape painter to King William IV of the United Kingdom in 1826. At least one of his drawings is still in the Royal Collection: "Windsor Castle, a distant view, with deer and horse and cart". He was also drawing master at Charterhouse School.

In 1827 the book Eidodendron was published (J. Dickinson, London, 1827), a collection of sepia-printed lithographs on chine applique, realized by the lithographer Charles Joseph Hullmandel (1789–1850) after H.W. Burgess's drawings. The subtitle is: Views of the general Character and Appearance of Trees Foreign & Indigenous as connected with picturesque Scenery. It is a set of pastoral landscapes, each featuring different species of large trees. Rural folk going about their routines provide a sense of scale.

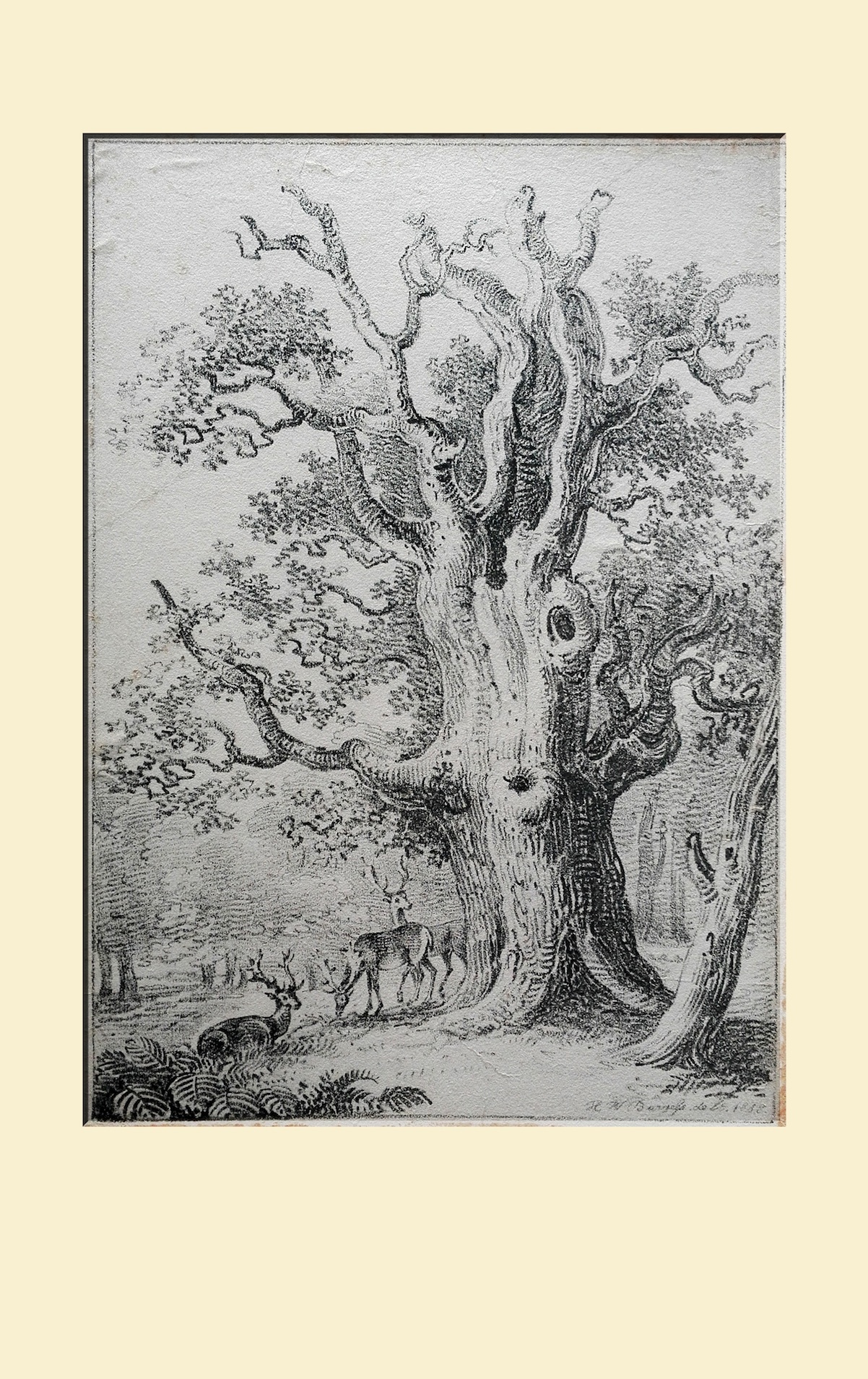
Drawing by Henry William Burgess, signed and dated 1818 - Private collection.

Burgess and Hullmandel were among the earliest practitioners of lithography in England, which in this series replicates the tonal variations of a sepia ink wash drawing very effectively. Burgess's attention to the qualities of light exhibited in these prints links him to his contemporaries John Constable and J. M. W. Turner.

Henry William Burgess died in London on 8 May 1839, aged about 47.

== Legacy ==
His drawings are held today by major galleries such as The Met, the Royal Collection, the Victoria and Albert Museum (an entire book of his pencil drawings bound in volume, c. 1832). The British Museum has a lithograph of his portrait as a young man, seated to right in armchair, holding portfolio and pencil, with facsimile signature, after a vignette by Sir William Charles Ross.
