= Thomas Burgess =

Thomas Burgess or Tom Burgess may refer to:

== Politicians ==
- Thomas Burgess (died 1623) (c. 1540–1623), alderman of and probably MP for Truro
- Thomas Burgess (died 1626) (c. 1580–1626), his son, Mayor of and MP for Truro
- Thomas Burges (1830–1893), Australian politician
- Thomas M. Burgess (1806–1856), second mayor of Providence, Rhode Island
- Thomas Burgess (settler), founder of Bala, Ontario, Canada, in the mid-1800s
- Tom Burgess (Newfoundland politician) (1933–2006), member of the Newfoundland House of Assembly and leader of the New Labrador Party

== Sportsmen ==
- Tom Burgess (cricketer) (1859–1922), English first-class cricketer
- Bill Burgess (Thomas William Burgess, 1872–1950), Olympic bronze medallist, swam English Channel
- Tom Burgess (baseball) (1927–2008), Canadian baseball player, coach and manager
- Tom Burgess (Canadian football) (born 1964), Canadian Football League quarterback
- Tom Burgess (rugby league) (born 1992), English Rugby League player
- Thomas Burgess (umpire) (1888–1974), New Zealand Test cricket umpire

== Other people ==
- Joseph Tom Burgess (1828–1886), English journalist, writer and artist
- Josiah Burgess (1689–1719), occasionally named as Thomas, pirate active in the Caribbean
- Thomas Burgess (painter, fl. 1786), English painter
- Thomas Burgess (painter died 1807) (c. 1784–1807), English painter
- Thomas Burgess (bishop of Salisbury) (1756–1837), Bishop of St David's and of Salisbury
- Thomas Burgess (bishop of Clifton) (1791–1854), English Roman Catholic bishop
- Thomas J. W. Burgess (1849–1926), Canadian psychiatrist
- Thomas Paul Burgess (born 1959), academic, novelist and musician from Northern Ireland
- Thomas de Mallet Burgess, British theatre, musical theatre, and opera director
- Tom Burgess (winemaker), founder of Burgess Cellars
