= John Cart Burgess =

English artist (1798–1863)

John Cart Burgess (1798 – 20 February 1863) was an English watercolour painter of flowers and landscapes, and an author of two books on art technique. He was part of the well-known Burgess dynasty of painters who flourished in the 18th and 19th centuries.

== Life ==
Burgess was the son of portrait-painter, William Burgess (1749–1812), and the grandson of Thomas Burgess (fl. 1766–1786). His brothers were the painters Henry William Burgess (fl. 1809–1844) and Thomas Burgess (1784?–1807). John started off as a painter of flowers and fruit in watercolours, first exhibiting three flower pieces at the Royal Academy, London in 1812; he was then residing at 46 Sloane Square in Chelsea. He also exhibited at the Suffolk Street Gallery and the British Institution. His works were much admired, and in brilliancy and beauty of execution were said to rival those of Van Huysum.

At the age of 27, he married Charlotte Smith, a talented sculptor, silver medal winner at the Royal Academy, and daughter of Anker Smith, a well-known engraver. The requirements of a growing family eventually compelled him to relinquish painting for the more lucrative occupation of teaching – for many years he held a prominent position as a drawing master. Among his pupils he numbered several members of the royal family. In 1811 he published a book on flower-painting and a treatise on perspective which went to several editions.

Burgess died in Leamington at the residence of his son, John Burgess (1813–1874), also a painter of note, on 20 February 1863.

== See also ==
- John Bagnold Burgess (1829–1897), nephew of John Cart Burgess
