= Bury Art Museum =

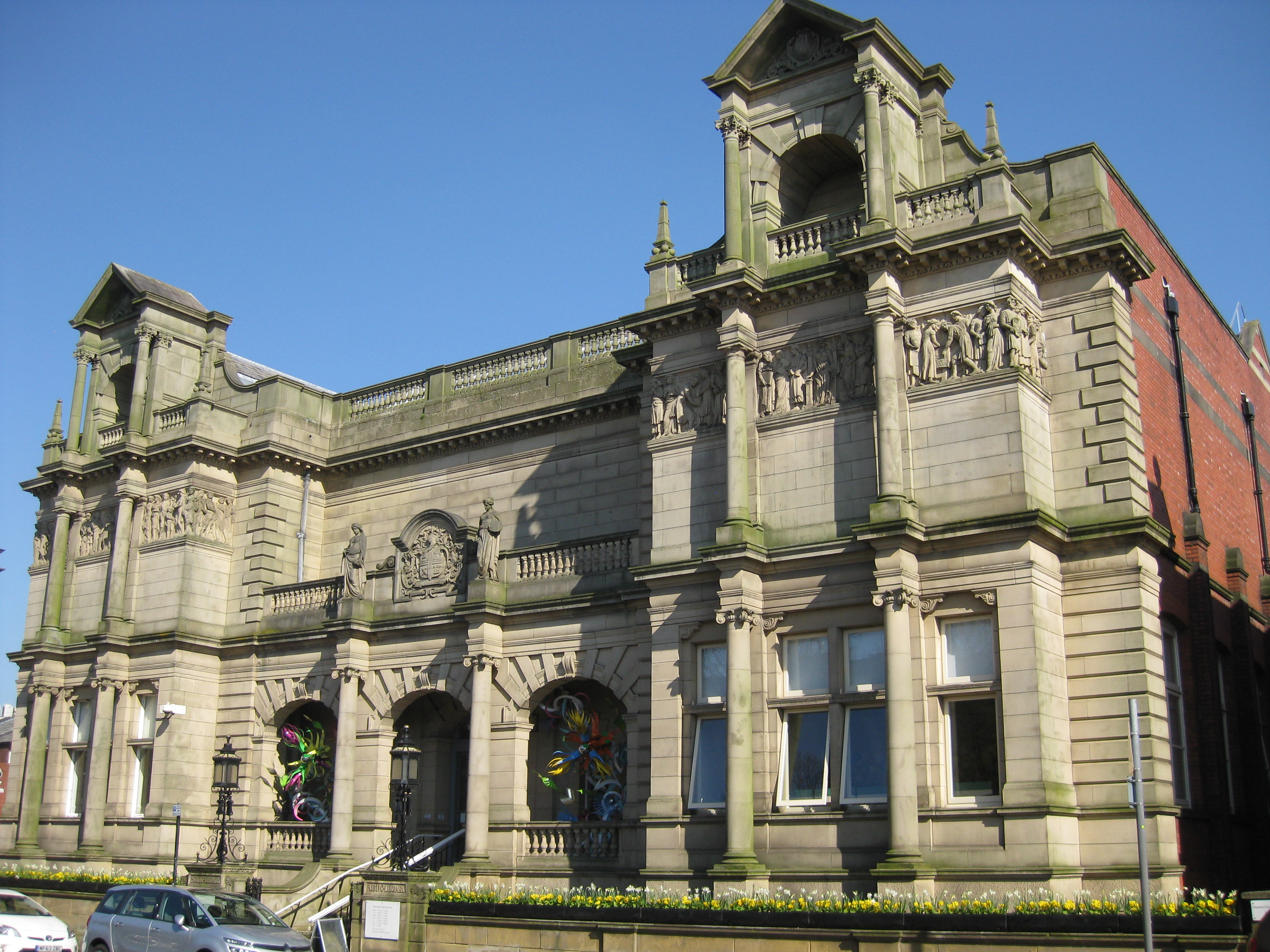
- Bury Art Museum with Bury Central Library

- Location of Bury Art Museum within Greater Manchester
- Established: 9 October 1901; 124 years ago
- Location: Moss Street, Bury
- Coordinates: 53.5917°N 2.2986°W
- Type: Art museum
- Collection size: approx. 62,000 objects
- Public transit access: Bury Interchange
- Website: buryartmuseum.co.uk

Bury Art Museum and Sculpture Centre, formerly known as Bury Museum and Art Gallery, is a public museum, archives, and art gallery in the town of Bury, Greater Manchester, northern England, owned by Bury Council. Built in 1901, the museum's buildings were restored and reopened in 2005.

== History ==
Bury Art Museum's collection was established, in commemoration of Queen Victoria's Diamond Jubilee in 1897, with the gift of more than 200 oil paintings, watercolours, prints and ceramics accumulated by the Victorian paper manufacturer Thomas Wrigley (1808–1880), on the condition that suitable premises should be built to house the collection. The present building was designed by the Manchester firm of Woodhouse and Willoughby, and was opened by Frederick Stanley, 16th Earl of Derby on 9 October 1901. The town's Museum opened in the basement of the Art Gallery in 1907.

== Collections ==
The museum's Wrigley Collection is an assemblage of more than two hundred oil paintings, watercolours, prints and ceramics, which includes works by J. M. W. Turner, John Constable, Edwin Landseer, and George Clausen. Donations of other artworks quickly followed the museum's opening, including donations from the town's Member of Parliament James Kenyon (1846–1924) and many others. Other paintings include works by Henry Dawson, John Bagnold Burgess, and Joseph Noel Paton. There are twentieth-century paintings by artists such as Victor Pasmore and Edward Burra, and the museum also holds more recent twenty-first-century art works.

== Restoration ==
In 2005, a £1.2 million refurbishment was carried out, designed to provide a brand new museum, art gallery and library all under one roof. This includes a combined Museum and Archives Centre which, based on a radical re-think, uses artefacts, documentation and art to tell the story of the town. The council decided, in 2006, to sell Lowry's painting The Riverbank at auction in order to fund part of its social services budget shortfall which resulted in the Museums, Libraries and Archives Council (MLA) removing its accredited museum status. Bury Museum and Art Gallery was renamed as Bury Art Museum in 2011. The most recent renovation includes modern artefacts such as iPods and electric iRobot vacuum cleaners.

== Gallery ==
=== Building ===
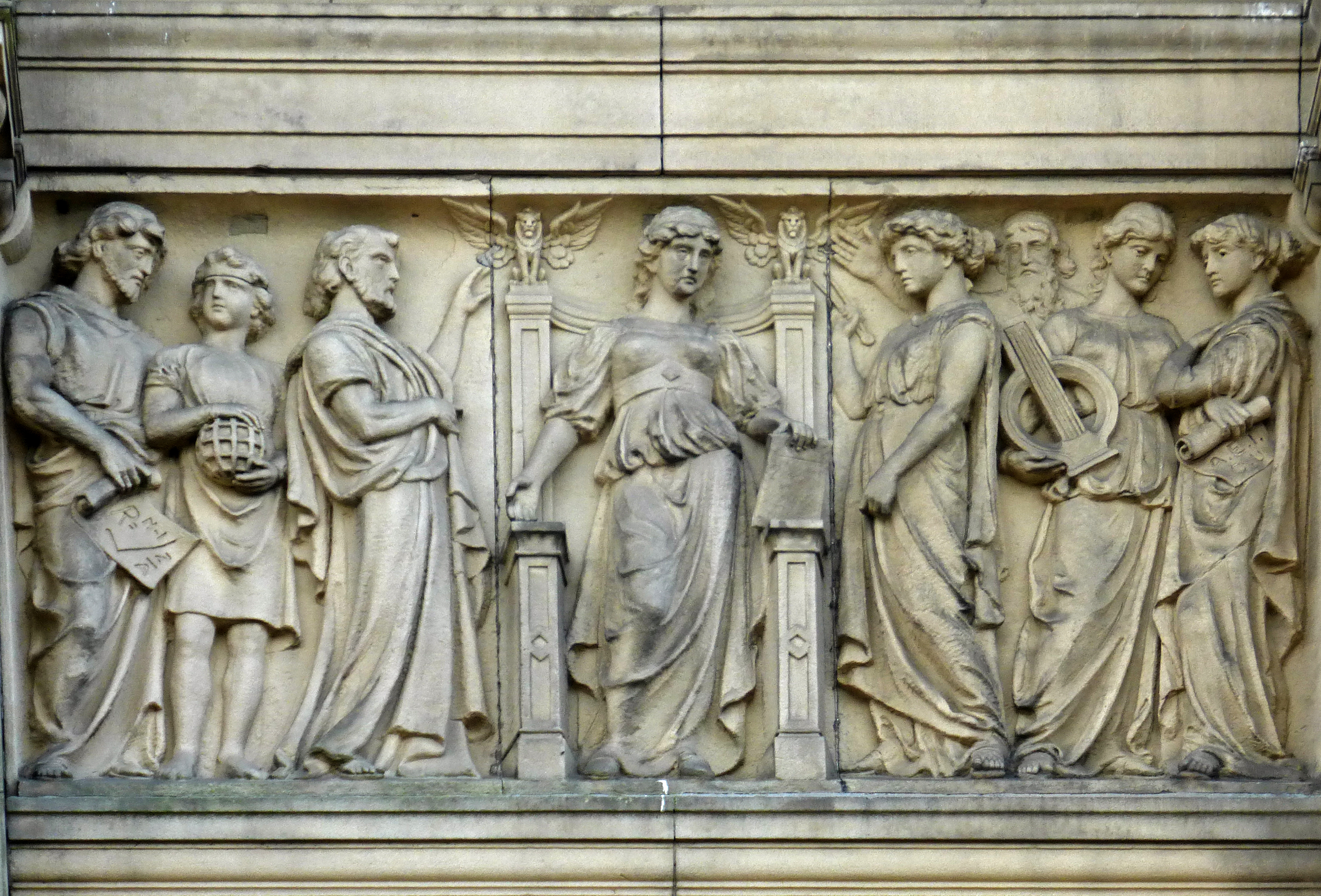
Detail from the Frieze, Bury Art Museum

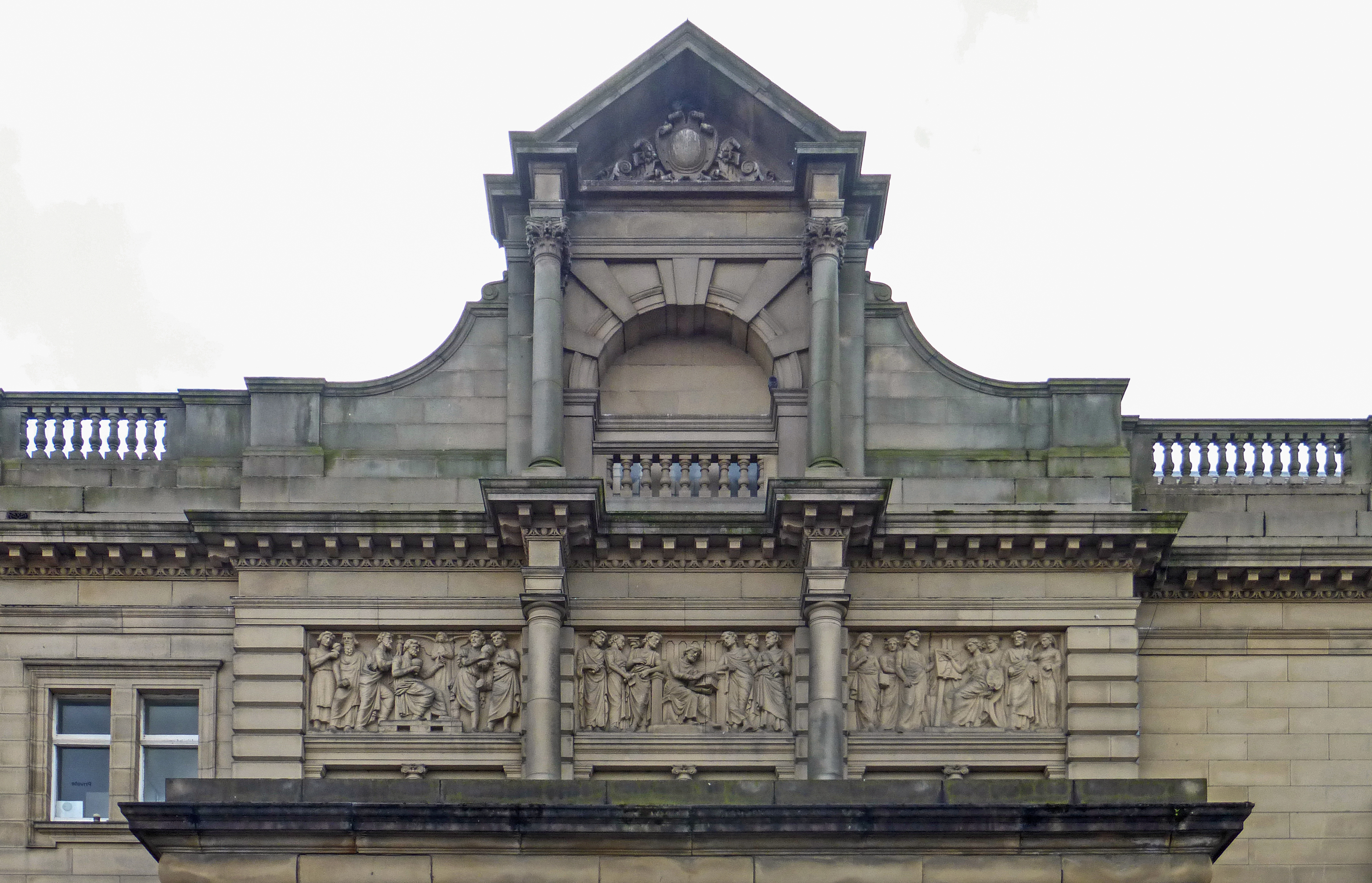
Frieze, Bury Art Museum

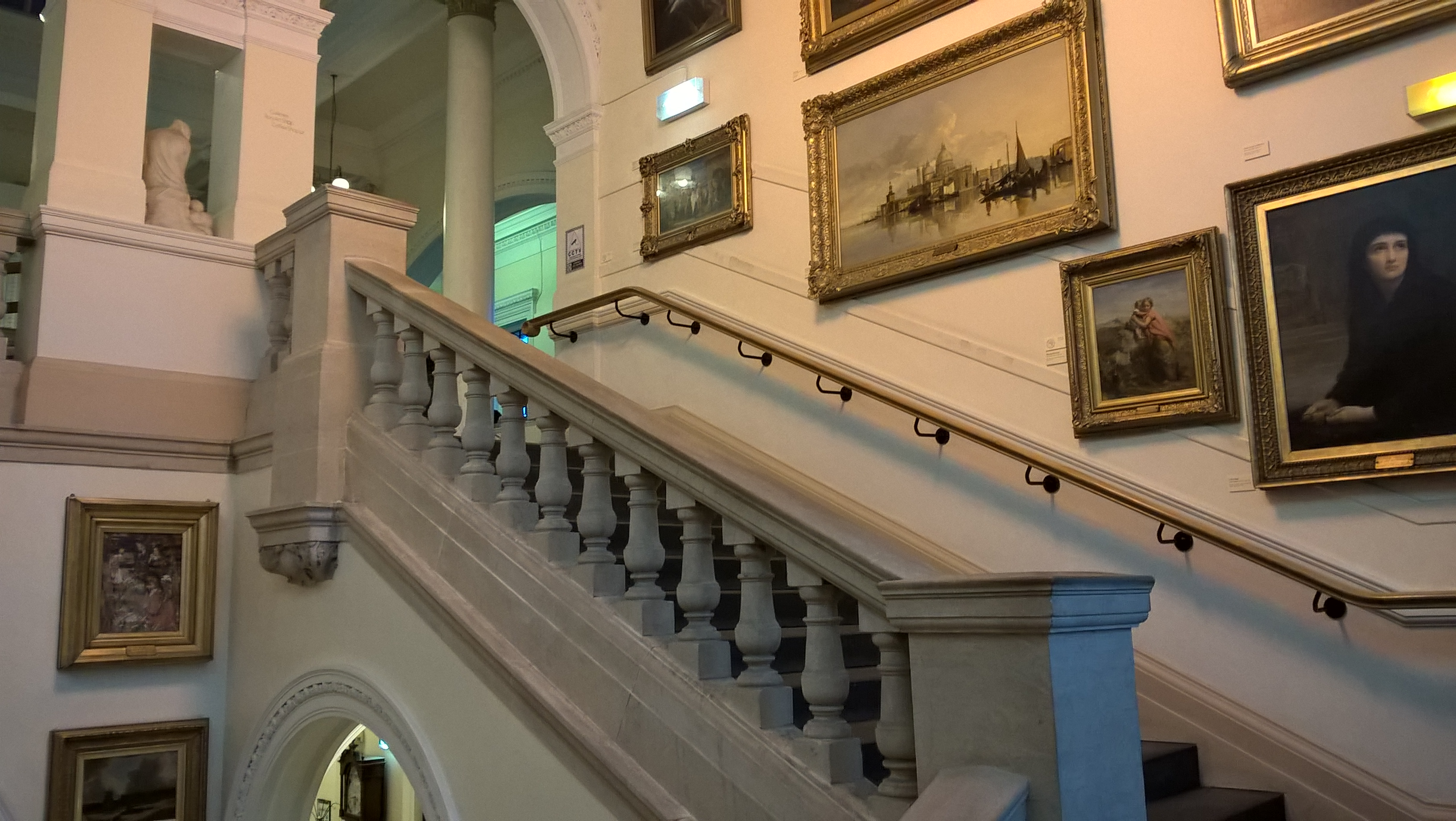
Staircase, Bury Art Museum

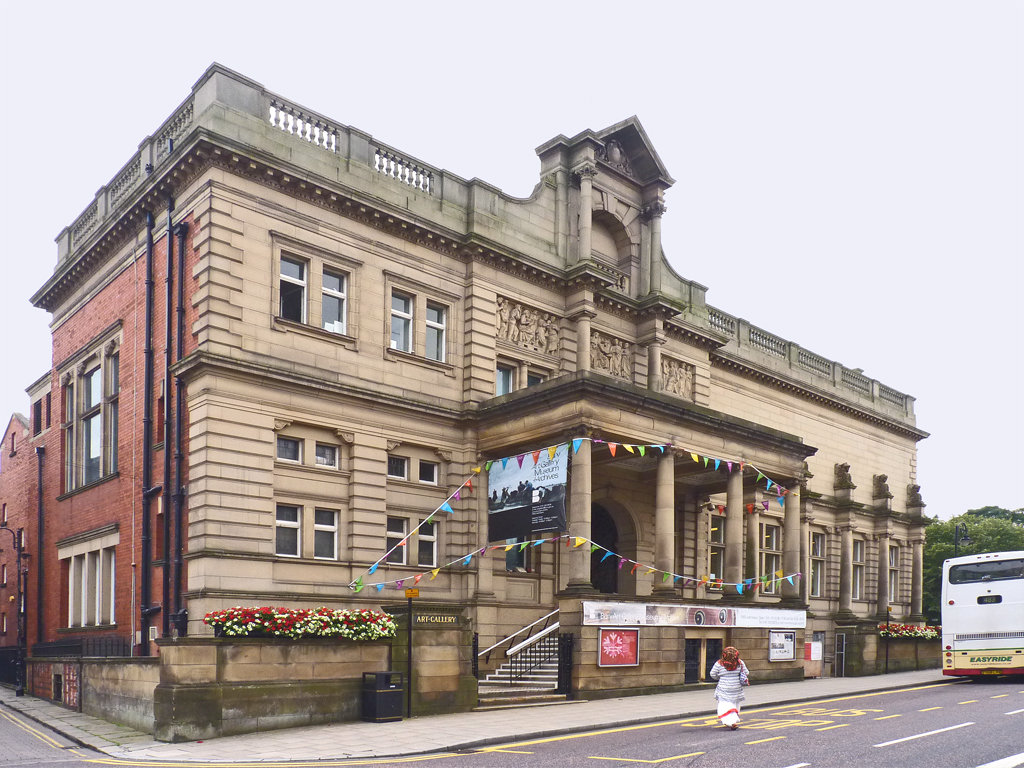
Exeterior, Bury Art Museum

=== Collection ===
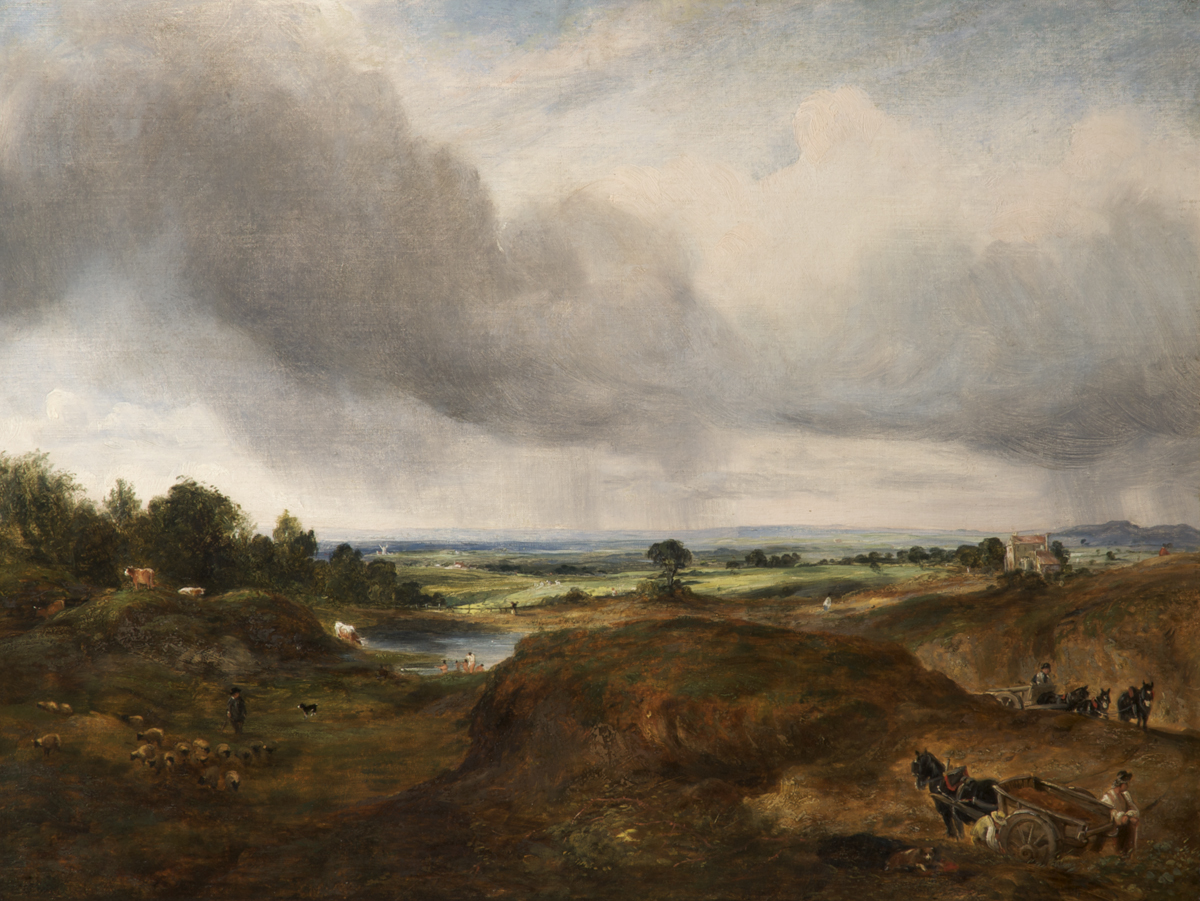
Hampstead Heath by John Constable (1821)

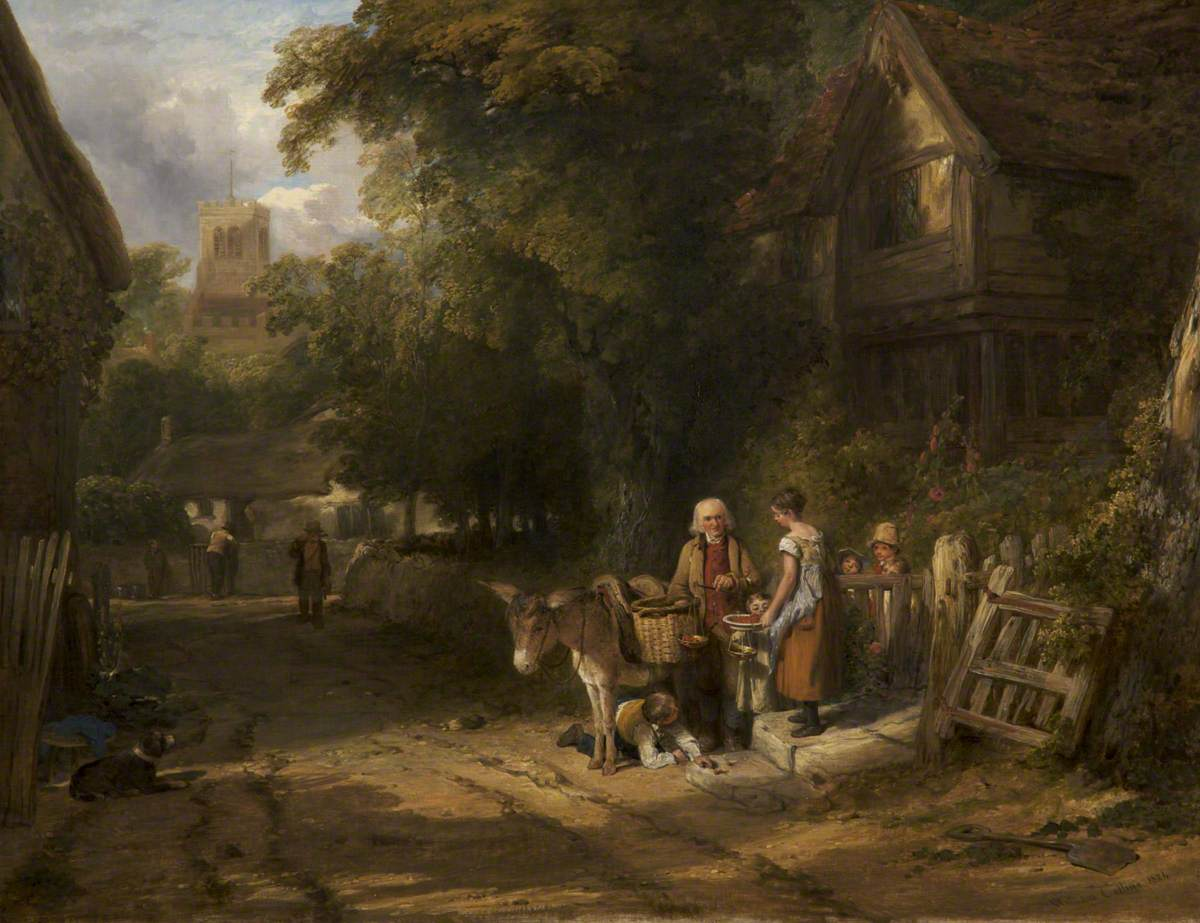
The Cherry Seller by William Collins (1824)

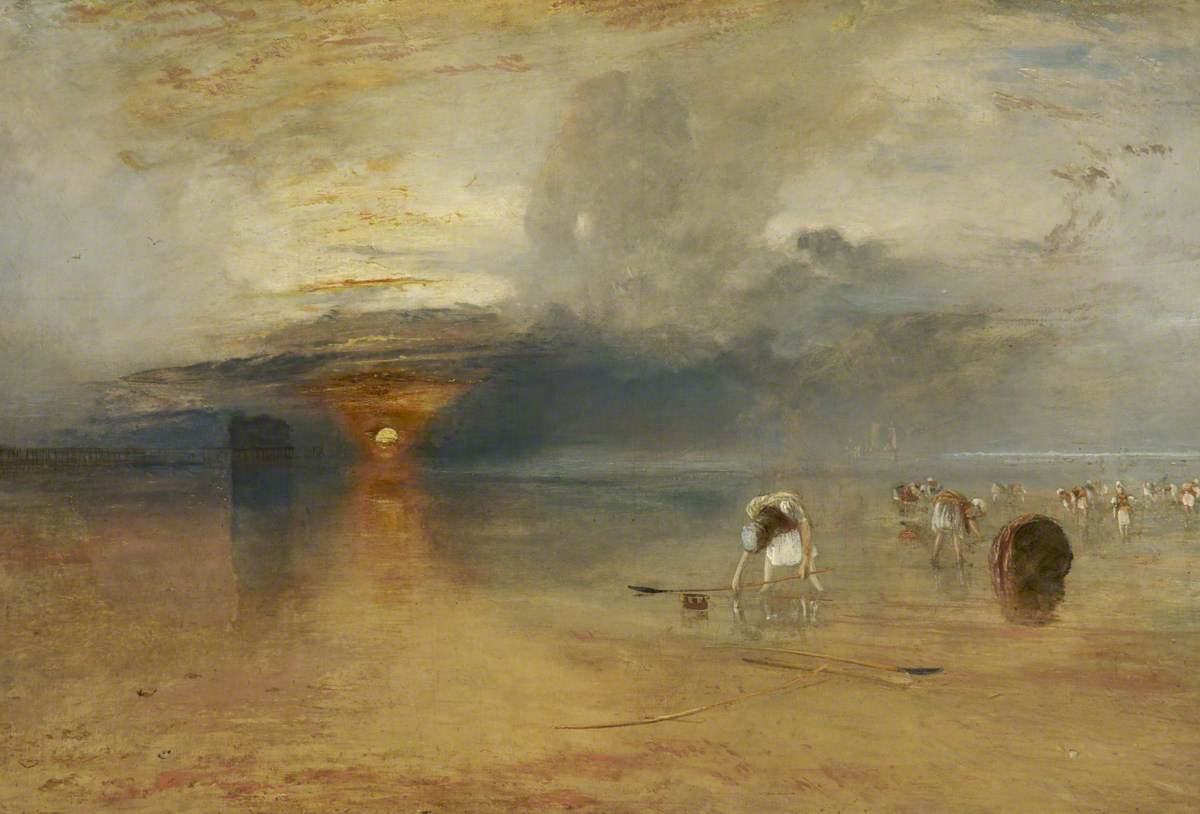
Calais Sands at Low Water by J.M.W. Turner (1830)

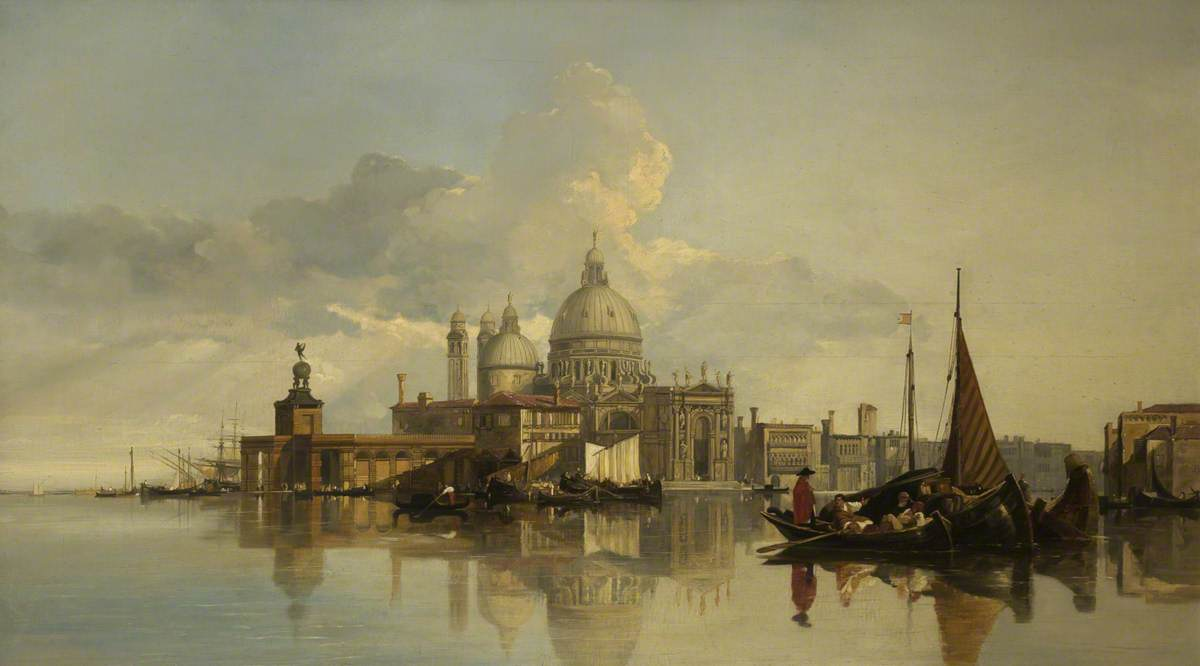
Venice, the Dogana and the Church of Santa Maria della Salute by William James Müller (1839)

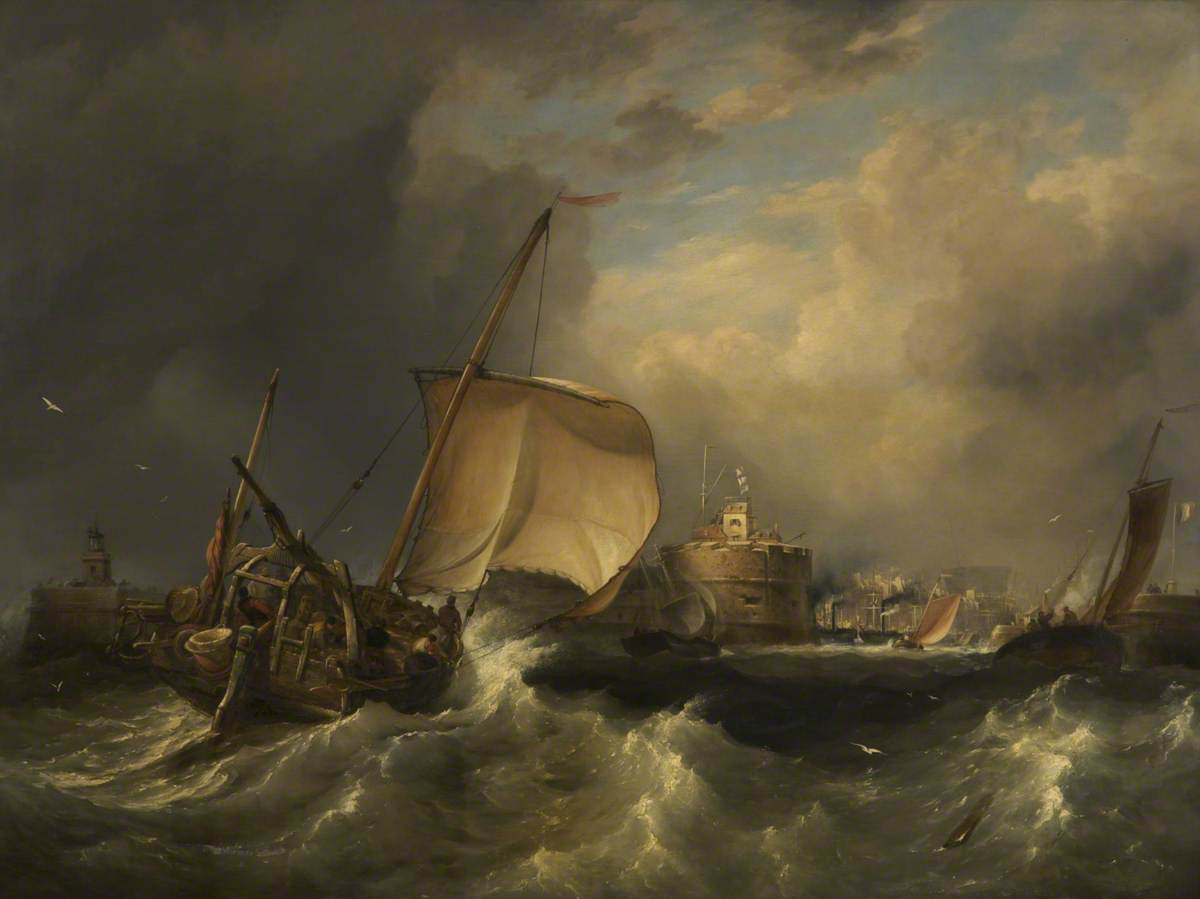
Off the Port of Havre by Edward William Cooke (1840)

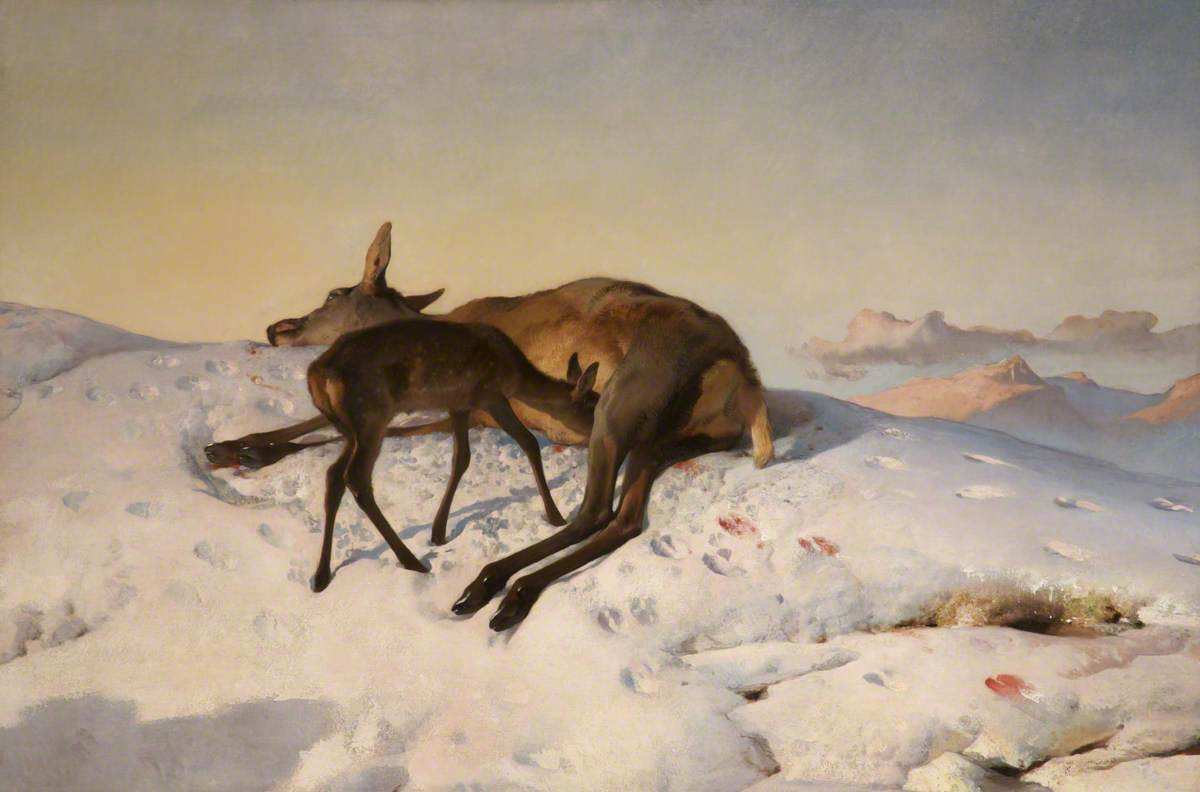
A Random Shot by Edwin Landseer (1848)

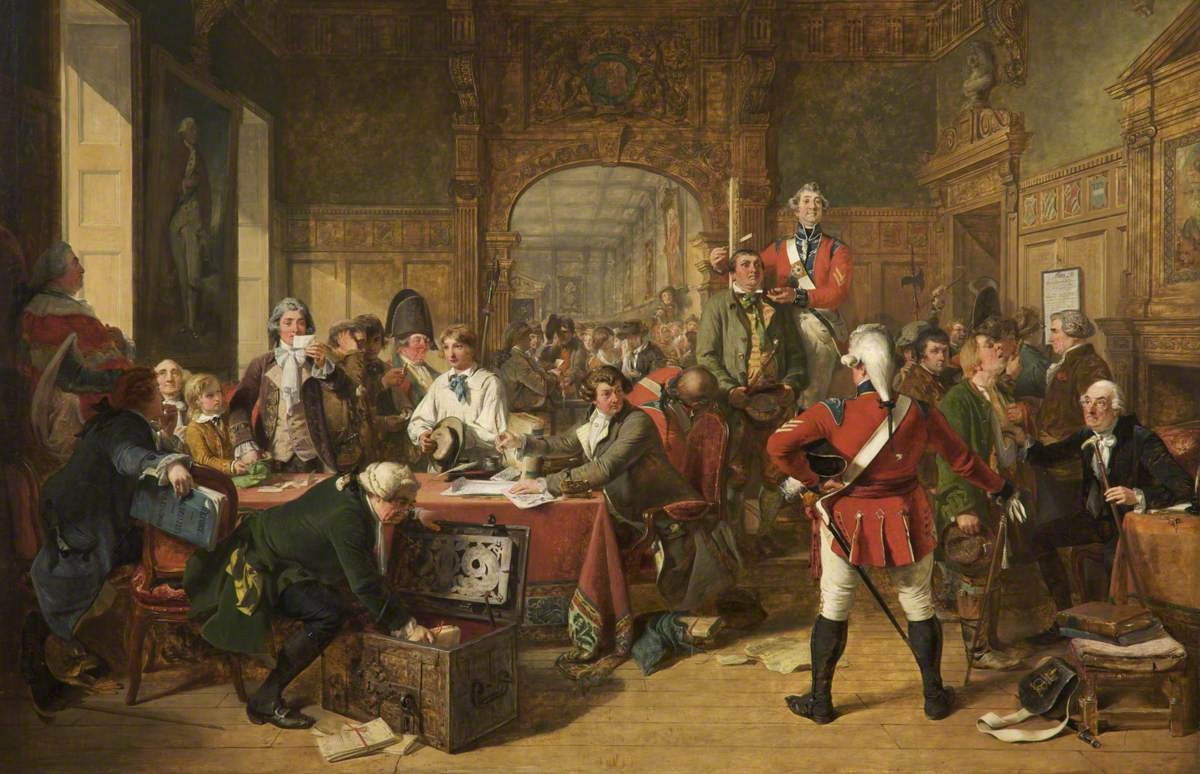
Drawing for the Militia by John Phillip (1849)

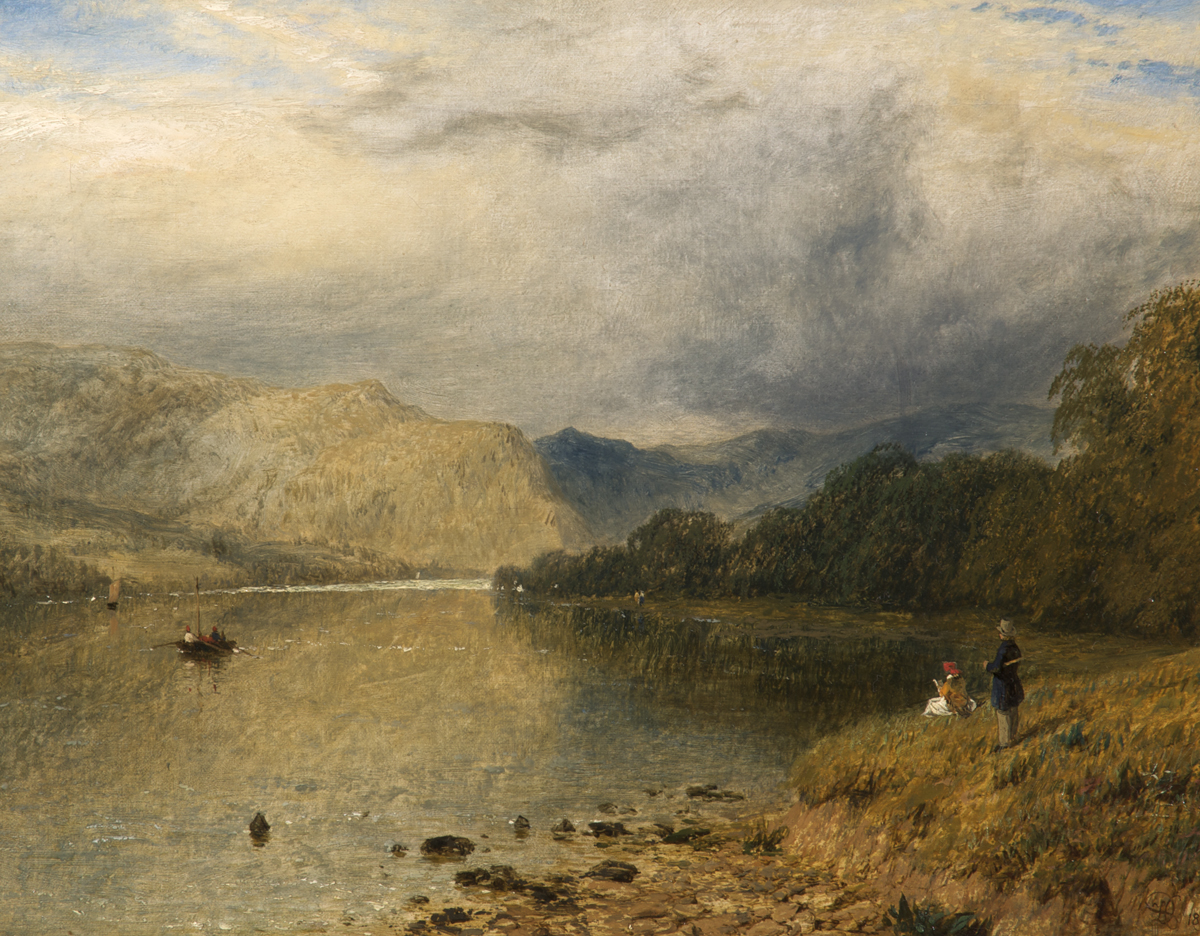
An English Lake by Henry Dawson (1851)

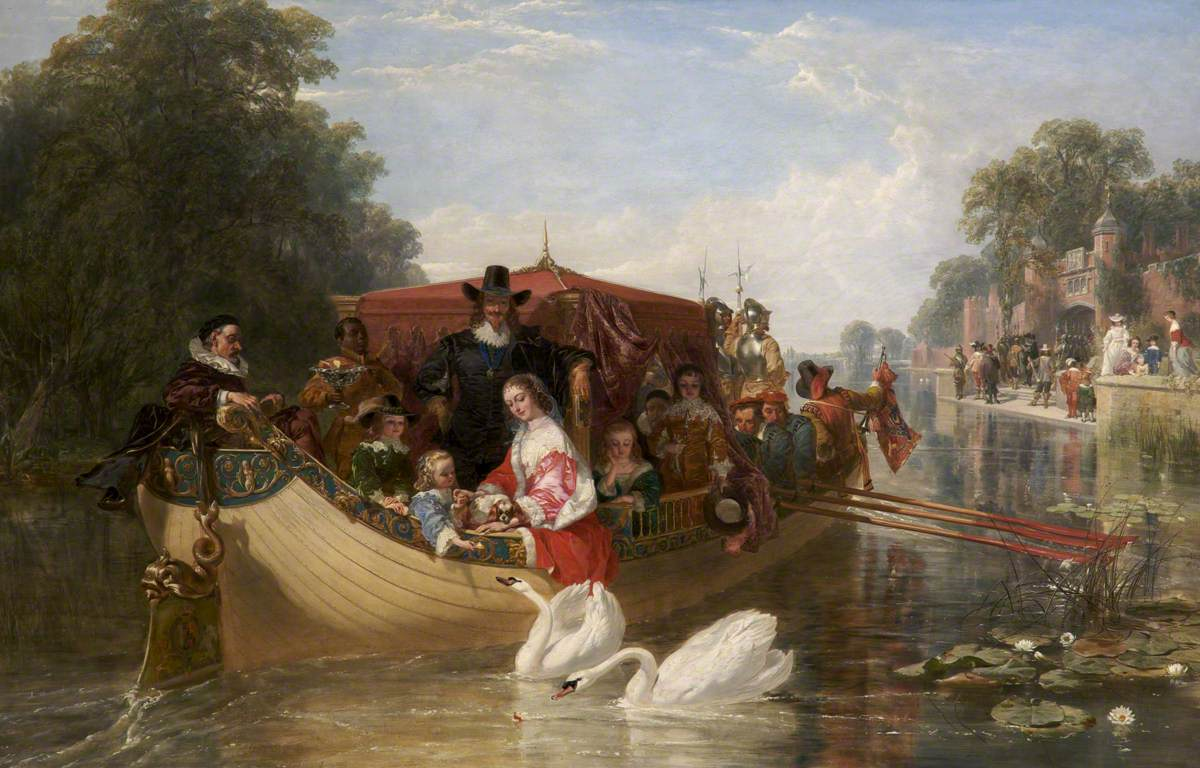
An Episode in the Happier Days of Charles I by Frederick Goodall (1853)

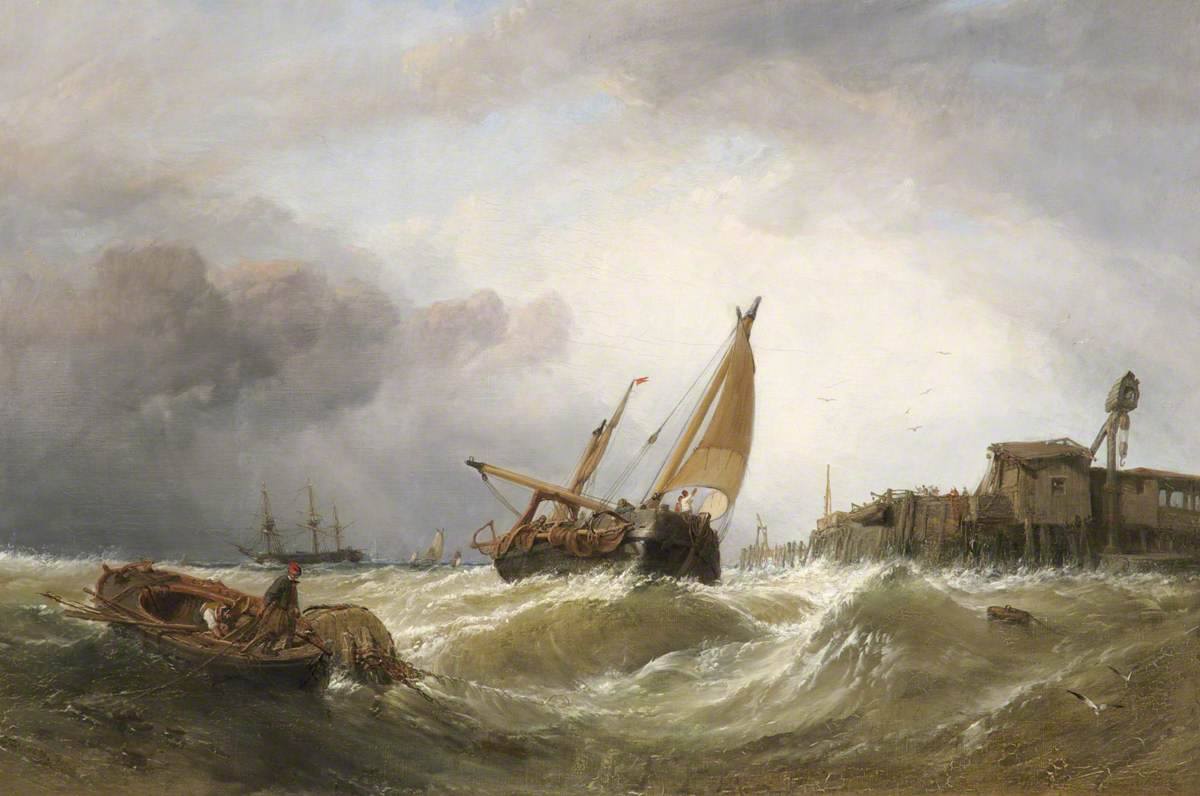
The Mouth of the Texel by Clarkson Stanfield (1855)

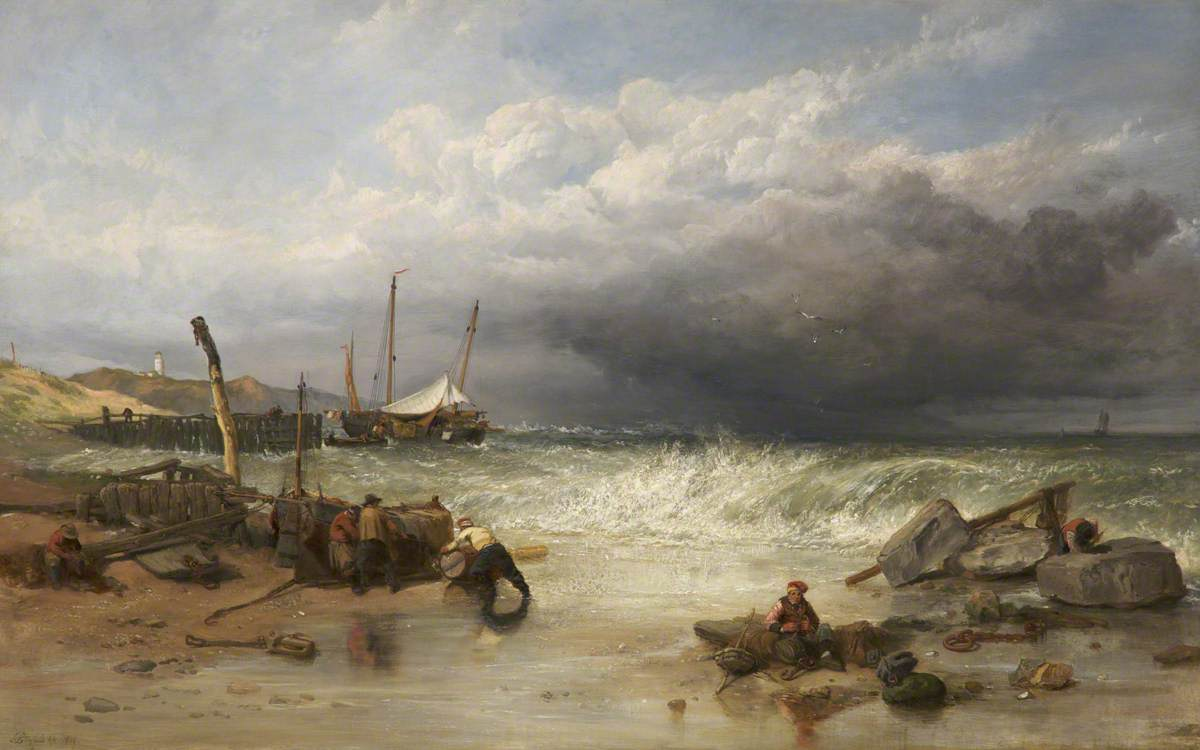
On the Coast of Brittany by Clarkson Stanfield (1858)

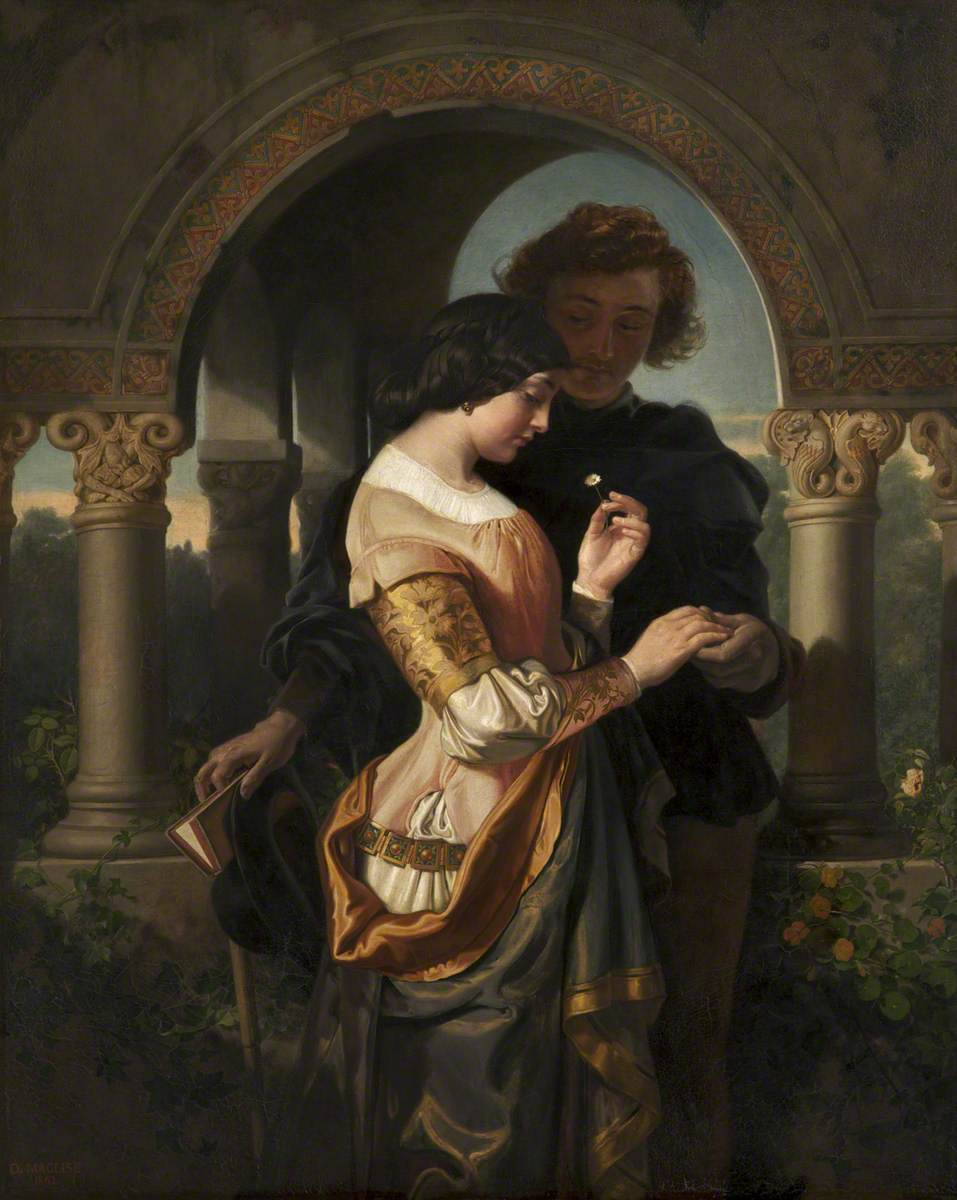
A Student by Daniel Maclise (1862)

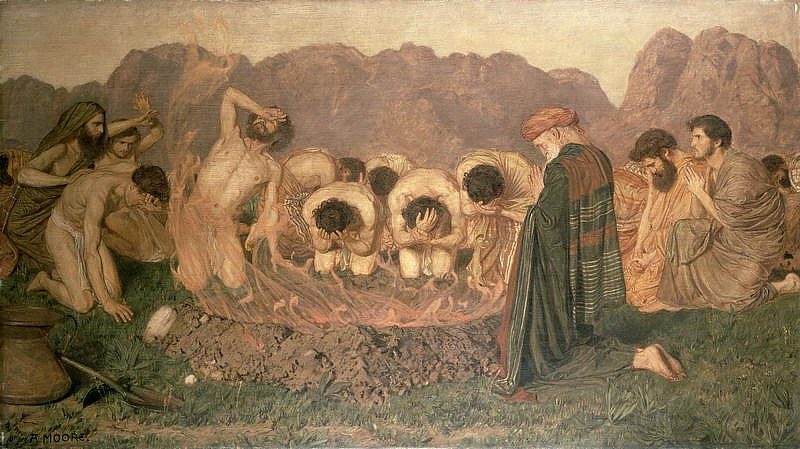
Elijah's Sacrifice by Albert Joseph Moore (1863)

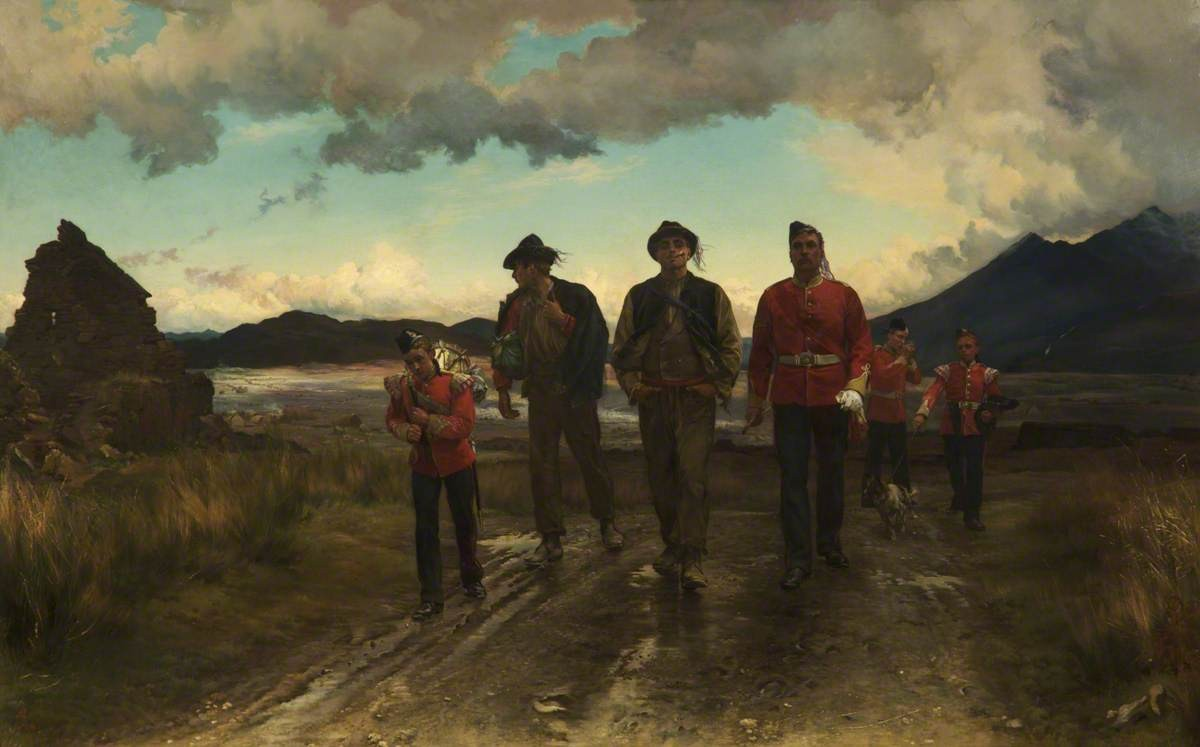
Listed for the Connaught Rangers by Elizabeth Thompson (1878)

Spring Morning, Haverstock Hill by George Clausen (1881)

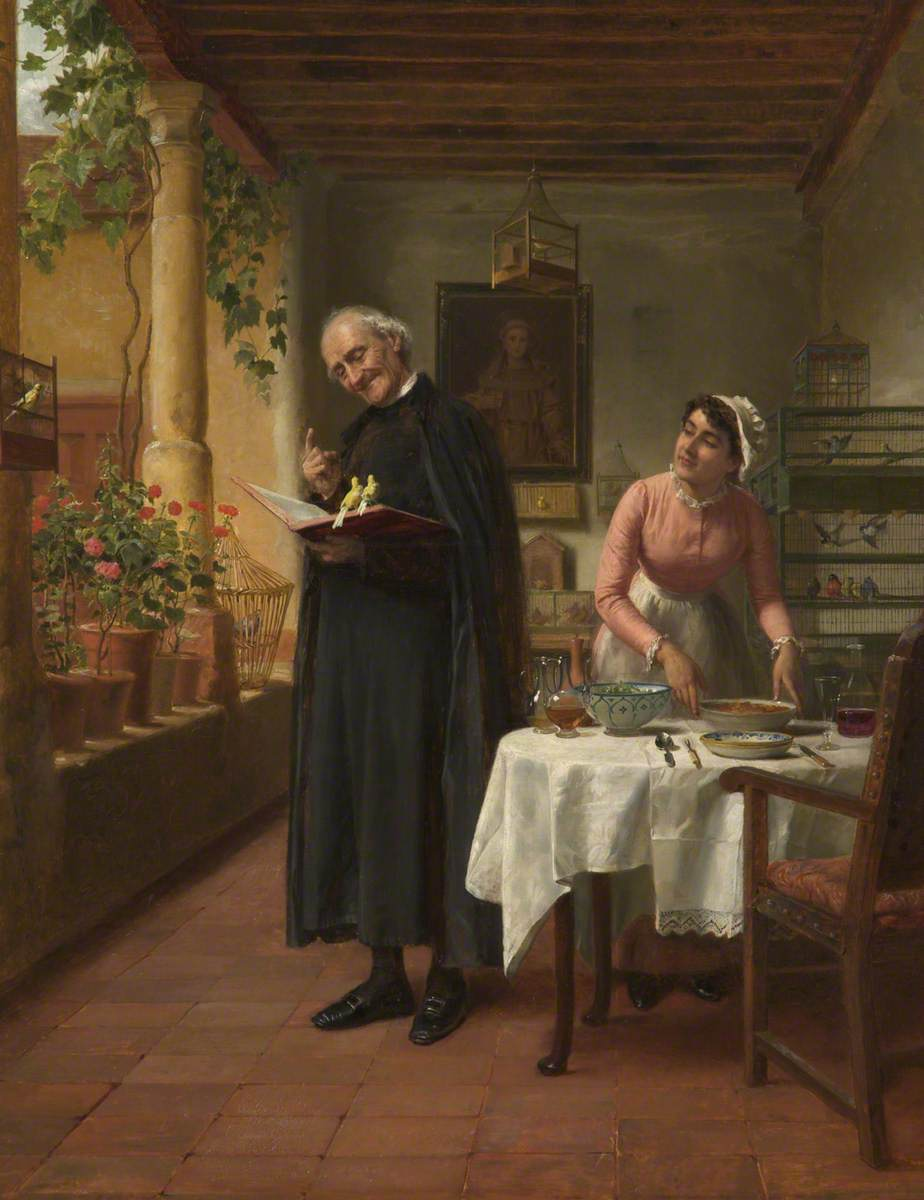
John Bagnold Burgess, A Modern Saint Francis

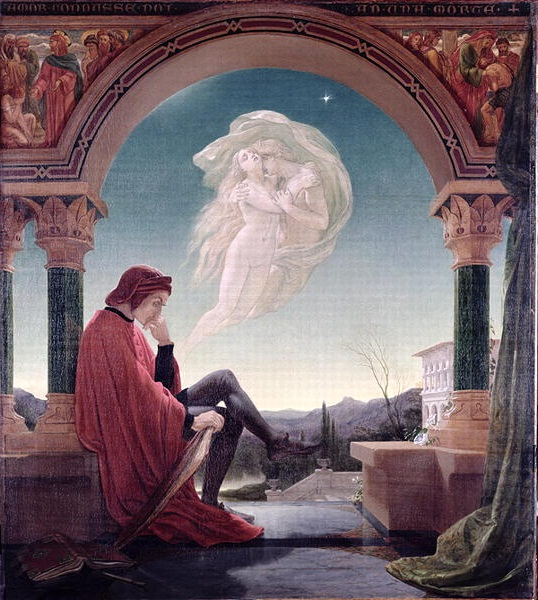
Joseph Noel Paton, Dante Meditating

== See also ==
- Listed buildings in Bury
- List of museums in Greater Manchester
