= Daniel Maynard =

Daniel Maynard may refer to:

- Daniel Díaz Maynard (c. 1934–2007), Uruguayan lawyer and politician
- Daniel Maynard Burgess (1828–1911), American surgeon and explorer
