= Henry Burgess =

Henry Burgess may refer to:

- Henry Givens Burgess (1859–1937), Irish railway executive
- Henry Burgess (priest) (1808–1886), English clergyman
- Henry Burgess (cricketer) (1879–1964), English cricketer
- Henry William Burgess (c. 1792–1839), British artist

== See also ==
- Harry Burgess (disambiguation)
- Norman Wettenhall (Henry Norman Burgess Wettenhall, 1915–2000), Australian paediatric endocrinologist and ornithologist
