= Norine =

Norine is a given name. Notable people with the name include:

- Norine Braithwaite (born 1951), English athlete
- Norine Burgess, Canadian singer
- Norine Hammond, American politician
- Norine G. Johnson (1935–2011), American psychologist
- Norine Kasperik, American politician

== See also ==
- Noreen (given name)
