= John Burgess =

John Burgess may refer to:

- John Burgess (actor) (1933–2010), English actor
- John Burgess (1563–1635), English Puritan clergyman, also John Burges
- John Burgess (political scientist) (1844–1931), American political scientist
- John Burgess (host) (born 1943), Australian television/radio personality
- John Burgess (1790s cricketer), 18th century cricketer
- John Burgess (cricketer, born 1880) (1880–1953), English cricketer
- John Burgess (bishop) (1909–2003), Bishop of the Diocese of Massachusetts
- John Burgess (priest) (1930–2019), Archdeacon of Bath
- John Burgess (record producer) (1932–2014), British co-founder of Associated Independent Recording
- John Burgess (rugby union) (1928–2015), Irish rugby union player
- John Burgess (rugby union coach) (1924–1997) English rugby union coach
- John Bagnold Burgess (1829–1897), English painter
- John Cart Burgess (1798–1863), English painter
- John D. Burgess (1934–2005), Scottish bagpiper
- John K. Burgess (c. 1863–1941), member of the Great and General Court
- John P. Burgess (born 1948), professor of philosophy at Princeton University
- John S. Burgess (1920–2007), Speaker of the Vermont House of Representatives and Lieutenant Governor of Vermont
- John Wesley Burgess (1907–1990), Canadian Member of Parliament

== See also ==
- John Burgess Karslake (1821–1881), English lawyer and politician
