= John Bagnold Burgess =

English painter

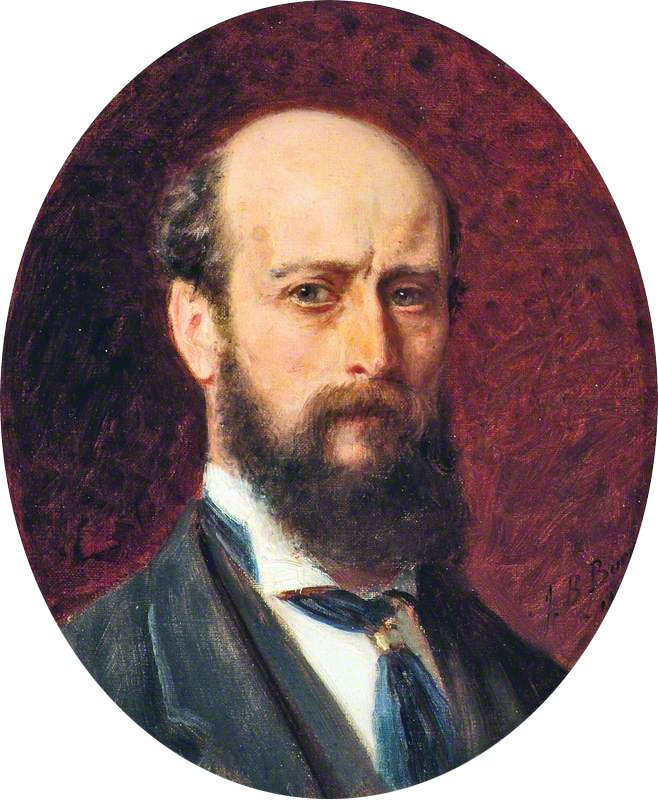
Self-portrait (1884)

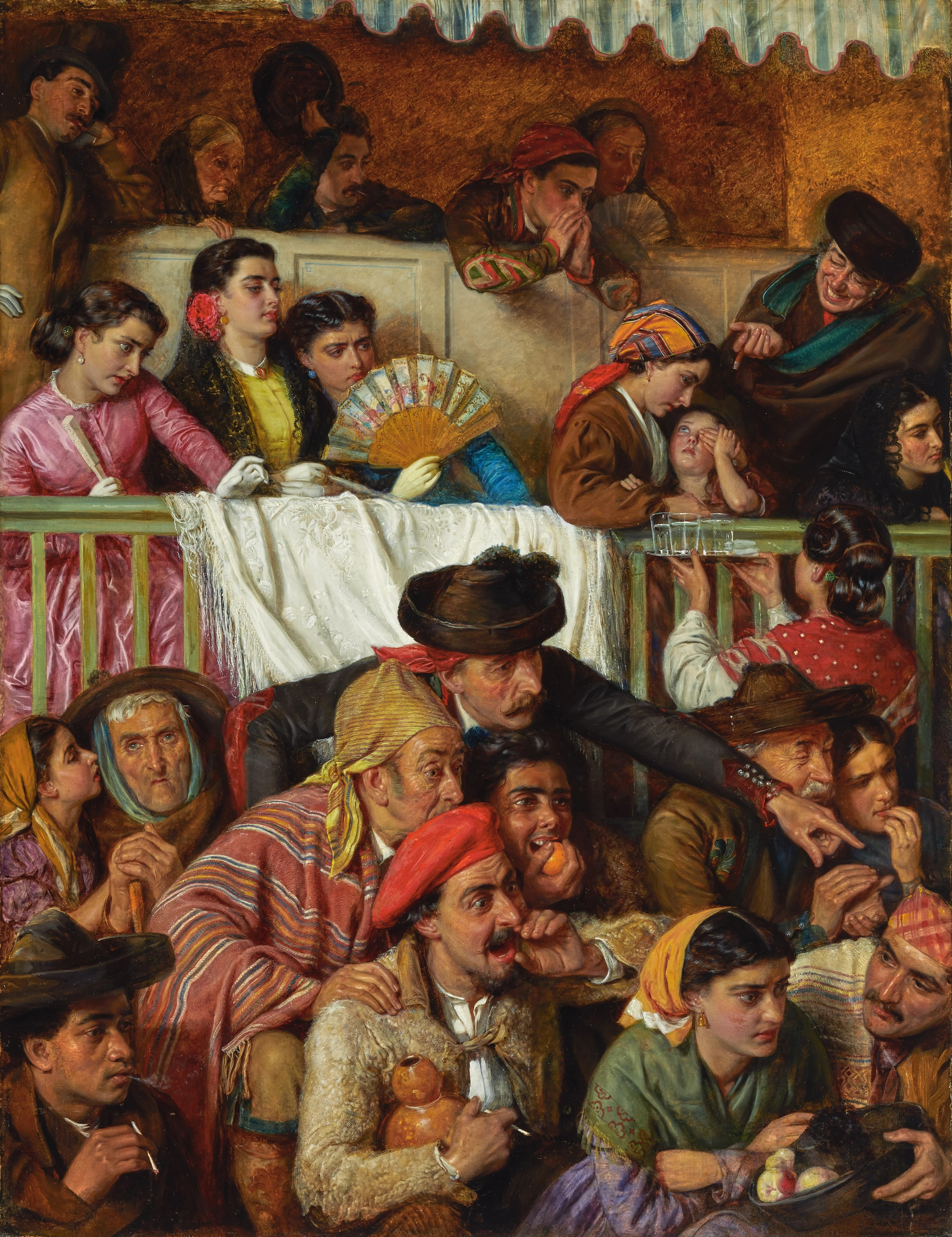
Bravo Toro!, 1865

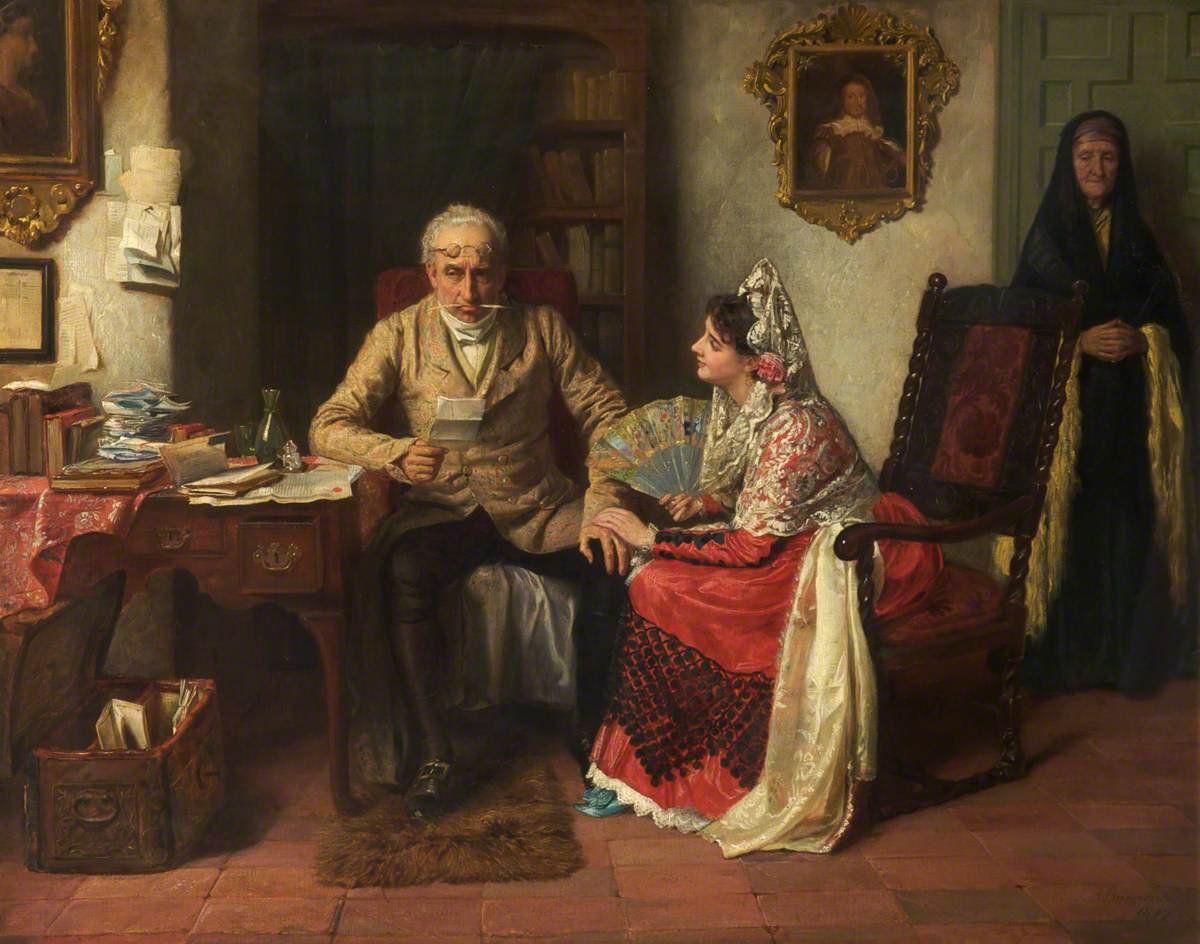
An Irresistible Appeal, 1877, Touchstones Rochdale

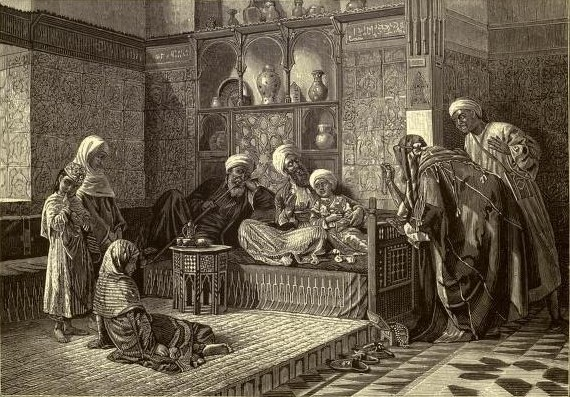
Childhood in Eastern Life (engraving after Burgess)

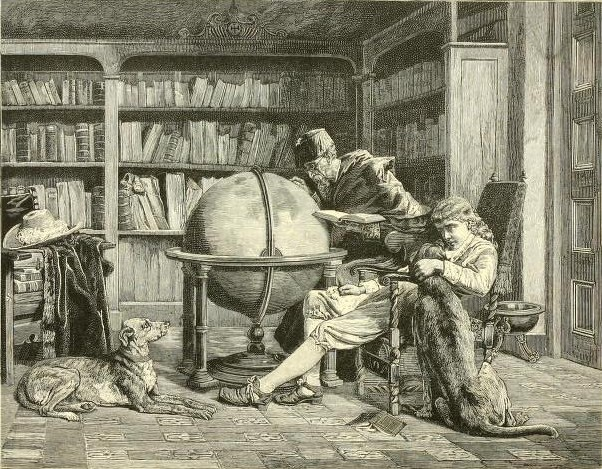
The professor and his pupil (engraving after Burgess)

John Bagnold Burgess RA (London 21 October 1829 – 2 November 1897 London) was an English artist known for his paintings of historical and genre scenes, principally in Spain.

He can be considered an English contributor to the mainly Iberian movement of Costumbrismo.

== Life and work ==
Burgess was born in Chelsea, in London, and was the son of Henry William Burgess, landscape painter to William IV, and part of a family of several generations of distinguished artists (see "Family" below). He was educated at "Brompton Grammar School" and, after the death of his father when he was 10 years old, received art training from William Charles Ross, the miniature painter - who had been friend of his father. In 1848 he went to James Mathews Leigh's art school in Soho. In 1850 he exhibited a picture at the Royal Academy and in 1849 entered the Academy schools, winning the first-class medal for life drawing. Each year from 1852 until his death, Burgess was an annual contributor to the Academy's exhibitions.

Burgess started his career by painting portraits and genre works, before travelling to Spain in 1858, accompanied by his friend and fellow artist Edwin Long - who would become his travelling companion on future painting trips to the country. For the next some thirty years, Burgess was an annual visitor to Spain, often spending days with Spanish peasants, living their life and sharing their food. He also went to Morocco at least once. In 1860, he married Sophia, daughter of Robert Turner of Grantham, Lincolnshire.

Burgess's first great success was his "Bravo Toro" in 1865. Some of his other important works are "Stolen by Gypsies" (1868), "Kissing Relics in Spain" (1869), "The Barber's Prodigy" (1875), and "Licensing Beggars in Spain" (1877). In June 1877, Burgess was elected an associate of the Royal Academy. Other paintings are "The Letter-Writer" (1882), "The Scramble at the Wedding" (1884), "The Cigarette Makers" (1887), and "Freedom of the Press" (1890), which was Burgess's diploma work upon being elected a full member of the Royal Academy in 1889. From 1850–97, Burgess exhibited seventy-three pictures at the Royal Academy, fifteen at the British Institution, and thirty or forty at other institutions.

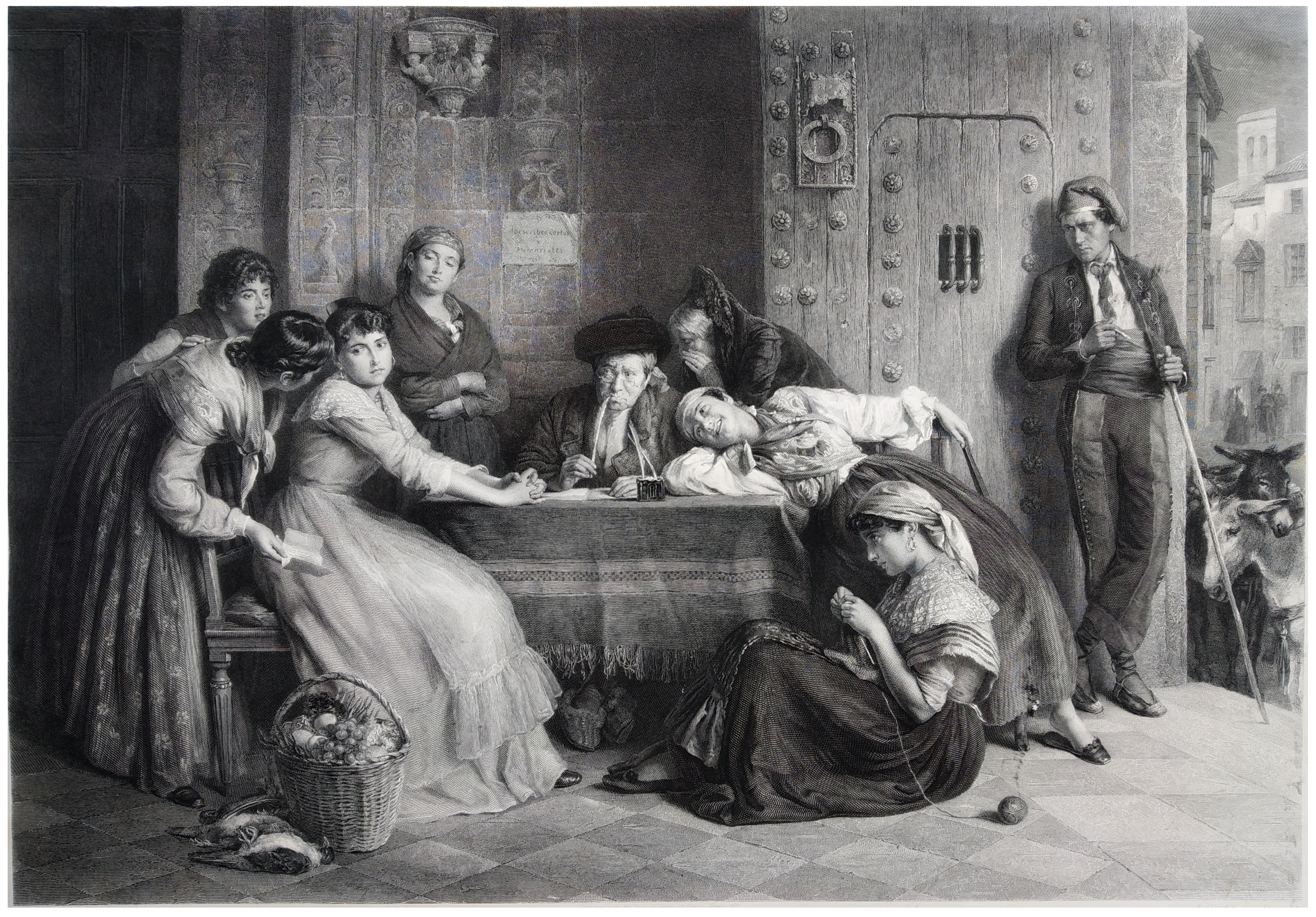
"A Spanish Letter Writer" after a painting by Burgess. Engraved by Lumb Stocks RA. Printed 1888

He died on 12 November 1897 at his home at 60 Finchley Road, London, from the congenital heart disease which had troubled him all his life, and was buried in the Paddington Cemetery at Willesden.

== Family ==
John came from a family of notable painters: his father was H. W. Burgess, landscape painter to William IV; his grandfather William Burgess (1749–1812), portrait painter; his great-grandfather Thomas Burgess (fl. 1786) numbered Thomas Gainsborough amongst his pupils; and he was nephew of John Cart Burgess (1798–1863), a flower and landscape painter, and Thomas Burgess (1784?-1807), landscape painter.
