= Richard Burges =

Richard Burges may refer to:

- Richard Rundle Burges (1754–1797), British Royal Navy officer
- Richard Goldsmith Burges (1847–1905), Australian politician
- Richard Fenner Burges (1873–1945), American attorney, legislator and conservationist from Texas

== See also ==
- Richard Burgess (disambiguation)
