= Daniel Burgess =

Daniel Burgess may refer to:

- Daniel Burgess (chaplain), chaplain to Horace Vere and father-in-law to William Ames
- Daniel Burgess (minister) (1645–1713), English Presbyterian divine
- Daniel Maynard Burgess (1828–1911), American surgeon and explorer
- Daniel Wright "Danny" Burgess Jr. (born 1986), American Republican Party politician in Florida
- Dick Burgess (1896–1983), English soccer player

== See also ==
- Daniel Burges (1873–1946), English recipient of the Victoria Cross
