= An Episode in the Happier Days of Charles I =

Painting by Frederick Goodall

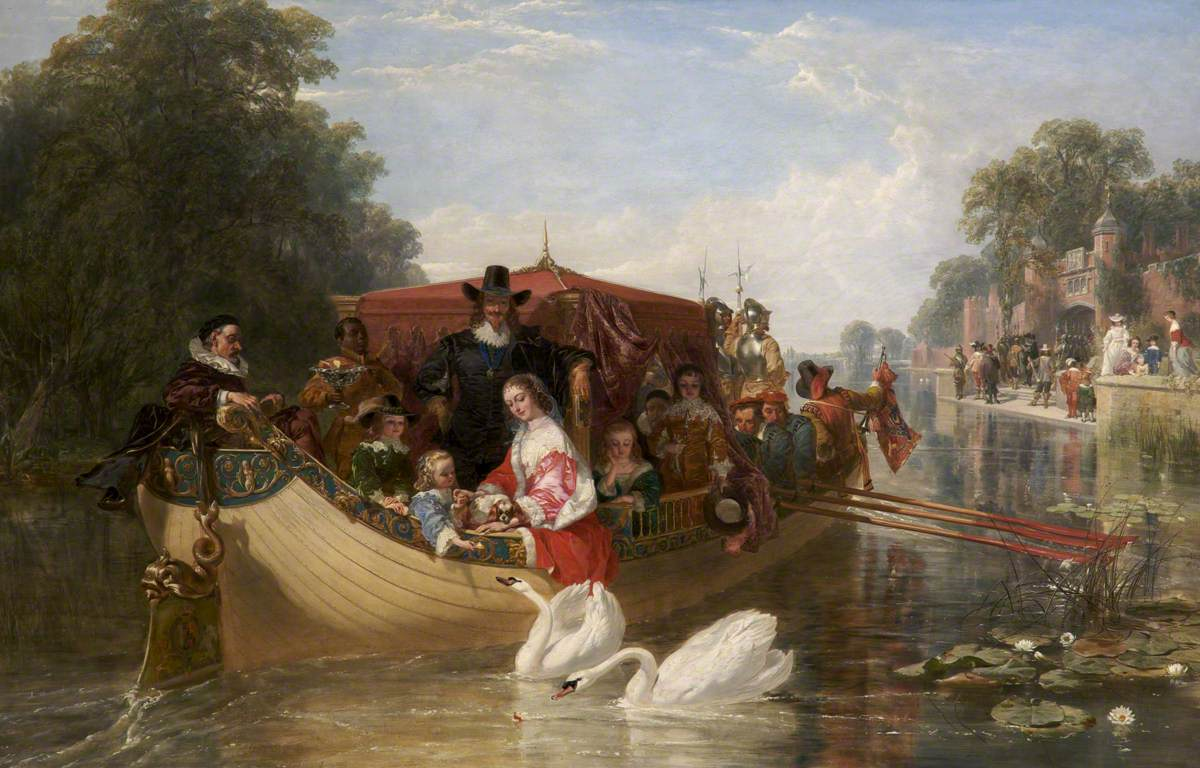
- Artist: Frederick Goodall
- Year: 1853
- Type: Oil on canvas, history painting
- Dimensions: 99.5 cm × 153.5 cm (39.2 in × 60.4 in)
- Location: Bury Art Museum, Greater Manchester

An Episode in the Happier Days of Charles I is an oil on canvas history painting by the British artist Frederick Goodall, from 1853.

== History and description ==
It shows Charles I with his French queen Henrietta Maria and children boating on a summer's day on the River Thames, near Hampton Court Palace. They are seen feeding the swans. An idyllic Romanticised scene, it shows the king and his family before the outbreak of the War of the Three Kingdoms that led to his overthrow and execution and the imprisonment or exile of the others. Goodall based the depictions on busts by Anthony van Dyck at Windsor Castle.

Portrayals of Charles as a happy family man were popular in the Victorian era, drawing parallels to the family bond between Queen Victoria and her husband Prince Albert.

The painting was displayed at the Royal Academy Exhibition of 1853 held at the National Gallery, in London, receiving an enthusiastic review from The Art Journal. It belonged to the art collector Thomas Fairbairn. It is now in the possession of the Bury Art Museum

== Bibliography ==
- Richards, Jeffrey. Sir Henry Irving: A Victorian Actor and His World. Bloomsbury Academic, 2007.
- Strong, Roy. Painting the Past: The Victorian Painter and British History. Pimlico, 2004.
