= George Higginson =

British Army officer (1826–1927)

General Sir George Higginson GCB GCVO DL
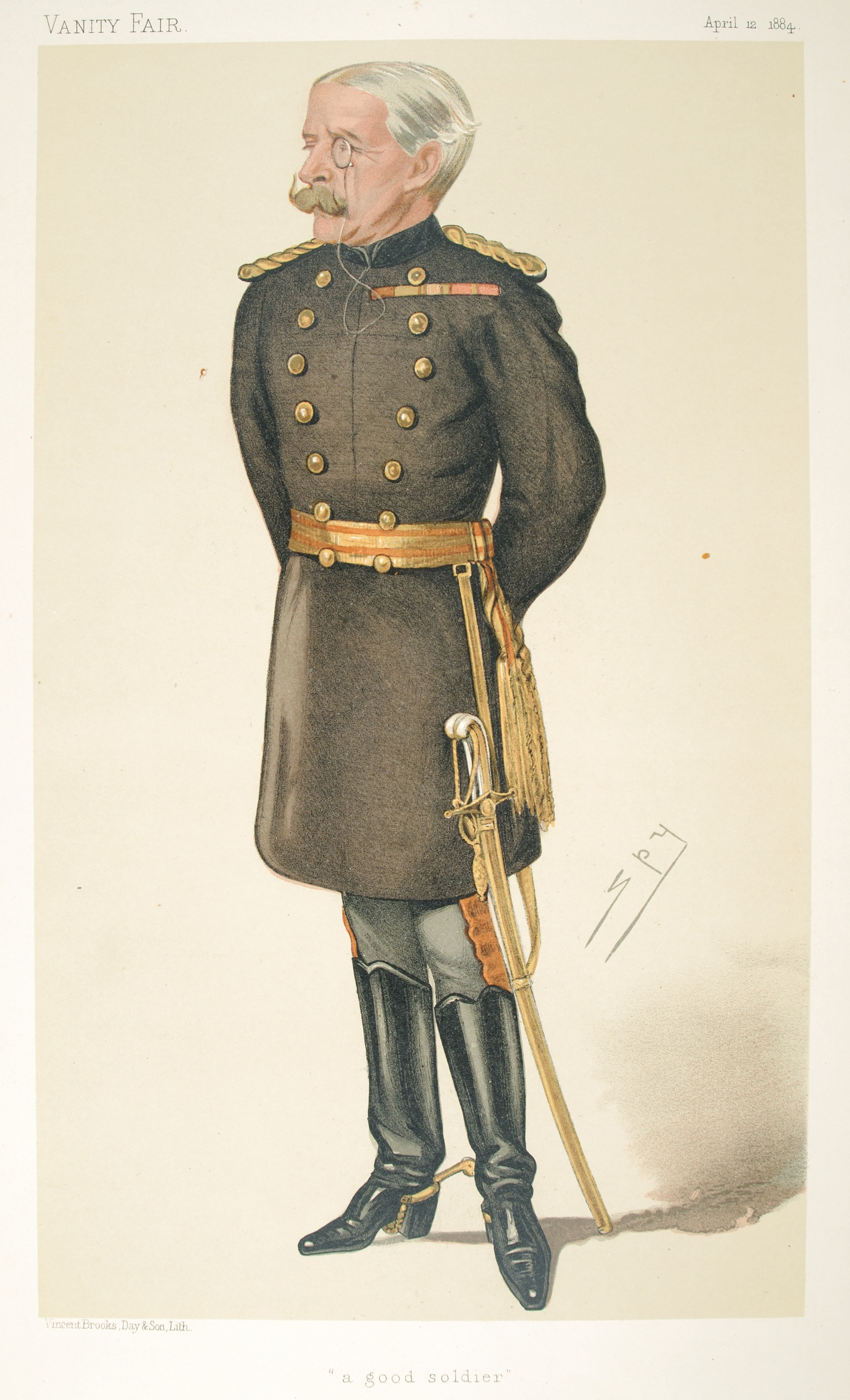
- A cartoon of George Higginson from an 1884 edition of Vanity Fair
- Born: 21 June 1826; Marlow, Buckinghamshire
- Died: 1 February 1927 (aged 100)
- Military career
- Allegiance: United Kingdom
- Branch: British Army
- Service years: 1845–1893
- Rank: General
- Unit: Grenadier Guards
- Commands: Home District (1879–1884)
- Conflicts: Crimean War
- Awards: Knight Grand Cross of the Order of the Bath; Knight Grand Cross of the Royal Victorian Order; Legion of Honour (France); Order of the Medjidie (Ottoman Empire)

General Sir George Wentworth Alexander Higginson, GCB, GCVO, DL (21 June 1826 – 1 February 1927) was a British Army officer and veteran of the Crimean War who served more than 30 years in the Grenadier Guards.

== Early life ==
Higginson was born in 1826 in Marlow, Buckinghamshire, England. He was the son of General George Powell Higginson, Grenadier Guards, who distinguished himself at the Battle of Corunna, and Lady Frances Elizabeth, daughter of Francis Needham, 1st Earl of Kilmorey. His paternal grandmother was the painter Martha Isaacs, wife of Alexander Higginson, of the East India Company, chief of the provincial council at Burdwan, West Bengal, and member of the Board of Trade. The Higginsons were a military family, and owned a large timber wharf on the Thames and land in Essex and at Marlow, Buckinghamshire. He spent his childhood in West London, which at that time consisted of villages and fields, and was educated at Eton College.

== Military career ==
On 14 February 1845, Higginson was commissioned by purchase in the 1st Regiment of the Grenadier Guards with the regimental rank of ensign (army rank of lieutenant). He was promoted by purchase to regimental lieutenant (army rank of captain) on 12 July 1850. He was appointed as the regimental adjutant on 5 December 1851. As adjutant of the 3rd Battalion, he served throughout the Crimean War. He participated in the battles of Alma, Balaclava and Inkerman, having his horse shot from under him at Inkerman. He was promoted to the brevet rank of major in the army on 12 December 1854. He was also present at the siege and fall of Sebastopol, following which he served as brigade major of his regiment, until the end of the war. He was promoted to brevet lieutenant colonel in the army on 2 November 1855, and was promoted by purchase to lieutenant colonel on 10 April 1857.

Higginson, throughout his career, travelled extensively on military affairs, to Ireland, Canada, France, Italy and Russia. He also spent time in the United States during the American Civil War, where he had family ties. He was promoted to the brevet rank of colonel on 30 September 1863, to regimental major (army rank of lieutenant colonel) on 10 July 1870 and to regimental lieutenant colonel (army rank of colonel) on 15 September 1877. He was appointed a Companion of the Order of the Bath in the 1871 Birthday Honours.

Promoted to major general on 1 October 1877, from 1879 to 1884 he was Major General commanding the Brigade of Guards and general officer commanding the Home District. As commanding officer of the Brigade of Guards, he was asked in 1882 to assist in the (now defunct) Royal Tournament. He was promoted to lieutenant general on 1 April 1883.

Higginson served as Lieutenant of the Tower of London from 1888 to 1893. He was knighted as a Knight Commander of the Order of the Bath in the 1889 Birthday Honours, promoted to general on 11 October 1890, and retired on 21 June 1893 after 38 years of service.

== Later life ==
He was a friend of the Royal Family, and had ties with King Edward VII. King George V and Queen Mary were regular visitors to Gyldernscroft, his home in Marlow. In 1923, aged 96, he became a godfather to George Lascelles, later 7th Earl of Harewood, the first grandson of King George V and Queen Mary, and elder son of Princess Mary and Viscount Lascelles.

On 24 June 1918, he was appointed a deputy lieutenant of Buckinghamshire. Higginson's 100th birthday was celebrated with splendour in his native Marlow. To mark that birthday, the inhabitants of Marlow organised a public collection and, with its proceeds, purchased Court Garden, Marlow and its grounds, alongside the River Thames, with the grounds becoming a public park called Higginson Park as a memorial to what they considered their town's most famous son. Higginson himself contributed to the collection. At a ceremony in the town, Princess Mary, the Princess Royal, presented the deeds of the park to Higginson.

Higginson was associated for many years with the Gordon Boys' Home (now Gordon's School) at West End near Woking, Surrey, which was founded as the national memorial to Major General Charles Gordon, who was killed at Khartoum, Sudan, in 1885.

Higginson wrote an autobiography in 1916, entitled 71 Years of a Guardsman's Life. Higginson died in February 1927, and his funeral, with full military honours, was described by observers as the grandest Marlow had seen, with hundreds lining the streets.

Military offices
| Preceded by Sir Frederick Stephenson | GOC Home District; 1879–1884 | Succeeded by Sir Reginald Gipps |
