= Martha Isaacs =

British artist (died 1840)

Martha Isaacs Higginson (died 1840) was an English painter. Probably born around 1755, she was likely the daughter of embroiderer Levy Isaacs, who lived in various locations around Drury Lane during the 1760s and 1770s. She exhibited miniature paintings, pastels, and other works at the Free Society beginning in 1771. She was a pupil of the painter Thomas Burgess.

In early 1778 she arrived in Calcutta to find work as a miniaturist, her arrival noted in his memoirs by William Hickey. She produced a number of miniatures of British subjects while in that city, including a portrait of Hickey. It was in Calcutta that after her conversion she married, in 1779, Alexander Higginson, a member of the East India Company from an old military family; her baptismal record describes her as "a Person of riper Years".

It appears that she ceased her artistic pursuits upon her marriage. The couple returned wealthy to England in 1782, but poor investments led their fortune to be greatly diminished by the time of Higginson's death in 1793. they had three sons, including Charles Harwood Higginson (1784–1824), a judge in the Supreme Court of Calcutta; Alexander (1786–1855) and George Powell Higginson (1788–1866) both served in the Grenadier Guards. George Powell Higginson was father of the distinguished soldier Sir George Higginson.

A portrait of George and his mother, dated 1787 but likely later, was painted by John Russell. Martha Higginson died and was buried at Great Marlow.
