= Sarah Burgess =

Sarah Burgess may refer to:

- Sarah Burgess (actress) (born 1970), British puppeteer, actress and vocal artist
- Sarah Burgess (playwright), American playwright and screenwriter
- Sarah Burgess (racing driver) (born 1980), Australian racing driver
- Sarah Burgess (singer) (born 1987), American singer-songwriter

== See also ==
- Burgess (surname)
