= David Burgess =

David or Dave Burgess may refer to:

- David Burgess (footballer), New Zealand international association football player
- Sonia Burgess (born David Burgess; 1947–2010), immigration and human rights lawyer
- David Burgess, English murderer of three girls in Beenham, England
- David Luther Burgess (1891–1960), Canadian World War I flying ace and politician
- Dave Burgess (footballer) (born 1960), English footballer
- Dave Burgess (politician) (born c. 1959), Canadian politician
- David Burgess (American politician), the first Black member of the Georgia Public Service Commission
- Dave Burgess (1934–2025), American guitarist for The Champs

== See also ==
- David Burgess-Wise, automobile historian
