= Paul Burgess =

Paul Burgess may refer to:

- Paul Burgess (musician) (born 1950), English musician
- Paul Burgess (groundskeeper) (born 1978), English groundskeeper
- Paul Burgess (athlete) (born 1979), Australian pole vaulter
- Thomas Paul Burgess (born 1959), academic, novelist and musician from Northern Ireland
