= Spring Morning, Haverstock Hill =

Painting by George Clausen

- Artist: George Clausen
- Year: 1881
- Type: Oil on canvas, genre painting
- Dimensions: 100 cm × 130.5 cm (39 in × 51.4 in)
- Location: Bury Art Museum, Greater Manchester

Spring Morning, Haverstock Hill is an 1881 oil painting by the British artist George Clausen. It depicts a street scene on Haverstock Hill near Hampstead in North London.

The painting was displayed at the Royal Academy Exhibition of 1881 at Burlington House in Piccadilly. Today the painting is in the collection of the Bury Art Museum in Greater Manchester, where it is one of the most popular paintings.

== Bibliography ==
- Denney, Colleen. At the Temple of Art: The Grosvenor Gallery, 1877-1890. Fairleigh Dickinson University Press, 2000.
- Happen, Theodore K. The Mid-Victorian Generation: 1846-1886. Oxford University Press, 2000.
