= Michael Burgess =

Michael Burgess may refer to:

- Michael Burgess (coroner) (born 1946), Coroner of the Queen's Household since 2002
- Michael Burgess (cricketer) (born 1994), English cricketer
- Michael C. Burgess (born 1950), US congressman from Texas, obstetrician
- Michael C. Burgess (editor) (born 1956), British actor, poet, activist and former editor of The Star-News
- Michael Burgess (singer) (1945–2015), Canadian singer/actor
- Mike Burgess (footballer) (1932–2021), retired Canadian-born English footballer (soccer player)
- Michael E. Burgess (born 1960), American actor
- Mike Burgess (Kansas politician) (born 1975), former Republican member of the Kansas House of Representatives
- Mike Burgess (intelligence chief) (born c. 1966), Australian intelligence official
