= Calais Sands at Low Water =

Painting by J. M. W. Turner

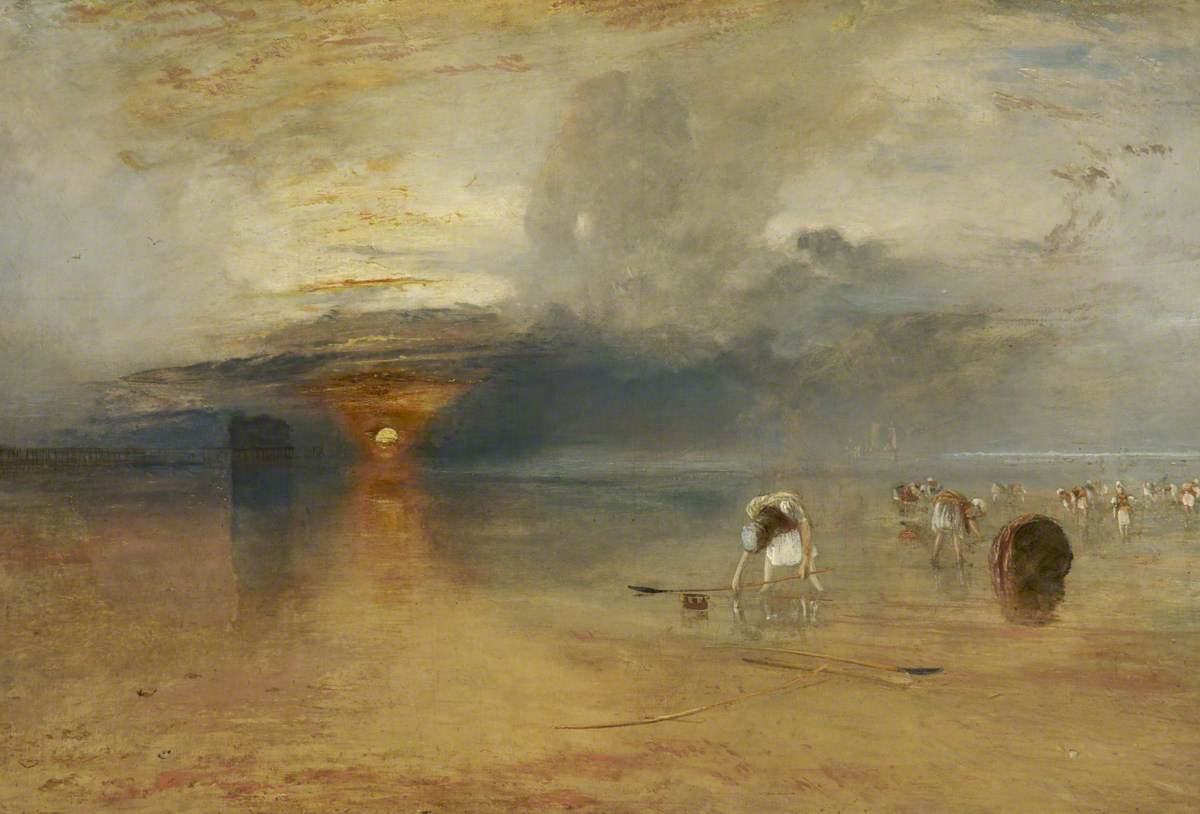
- Artist: J. M. W. Turner
- Year: 1830
- Type: Oil on canvas, landscape painting
- Dimensions: 68.5 cm × 105.5 cm (27.0 in × 41.5 in)
- Location: Bury Art Museum, Greater Manchester

Calais Sands at Low Water: Poissards Collecting Bait is an 1830 landscape painting by the British artist J.M.W. Turner. It depicts a view of the beach near Calais at low tide as a group of women with spades hunt for bait for the fisherman to use. Poissard is the French equivalent of the English expression "fishwife".

The style of the painting, somewhat unusual for Turner, has been identified as a tribute by him to the artist Richard Parkes Bonington whose Romantic views of the French coast had attracted enormous praise before his death from consumption at the age of 25 in 1828.

The picture was displayed at the Royal Academy Exhibition of 1830 at Somerset House in London. Today the painting is in the collection of the Bury Art Museum in Greater Manchester, having been acquired in 1897 as part of a gift to mark the Diamond Jubilee of Queen Victoria.

== See also ==
- List of paintings by J. M. W. Turner

== Bibliography ==
- Costello, Leo. J.M.W. Turner and the Subject of History. Taylor and Francis, 2017.
- Hamilton, James. Turner: The Late Seascapes. Manchester Art Gallery, 2003.
- Noon, Patrick & Bann, Stephen. Constable to Delacroix: British Art and the French Romantics. Tate, 2003.
- Trotter, David. Cooking with Mud: The Idea of Mess in Nineteenth-century Art and Fiction. Cambridge University Press, 2000.
