= Michael E. Burgess =

American actor

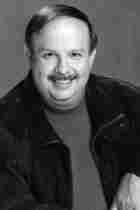
- Michael E. Burgess, 2005.
- Born: Michael Eldon Burgess; June 1, 1960 (age 66); Studio City, California, United States
- Years active: (1971-present)
- Website: http://www.michaeleburgess.com/

Michael Eldon Burgess (born June 1, 1960) is an American actor known for his sinister television portrayal of Dennis Rader, the BTK Killer.

== Early life ==
Burgess was born in Lusk, Wyoming and grew up in Central City, Nebraska, the son of Eldon V. and Ida May Spencer Burgess. His father was a master electrician and electrical engineer with various public utilities and municipalities in the state of Nebraska. His mother was a career nurse. As a boy Burgess was very involved with the Boy Scouts of America, eventually rising to the rank of Eagle Scout in 1976, along with Vigil Honor in Scouting's Order of the Arrow later that same year. In the Order of the Arrow, he was a member of the now-renamed We-U-Shi Lodge. He rose as high in the organization as Junior Assistant Scoutmaster in Troop 114 of the Overland Trails Council in Grand Island, Nebraska. He graduated from Central City High School in 1978. He joined the United States Navy right out of high school and became a Hospital Corpsman. He was eventually assigned to the United States Marine Corps, serving with the 3rd Battalion, 1st Marines at Camp Pendleton, California, from 1980 to 1982. After being honorably discharged from the Navy he worked as a nurse in the San Francisco Bay Area for a decade while trying to be an actor. He was a hair and hand model in various print ads while still stationed with the Marines, and worked a lot in Southern California during those years.

The elder Burgess eventually became a general contractor upon moving with his wife to Oakland, California in the Spring of 1979, at which time Michael was stationed at the Naval Hospital-Oakland. Both of Burgess' parents died in 1996, within 28 days of each other, after more than 45 years together as a married couple.

Burgess had one younger adopted brother, Martin Verlin Burgess (born 1960), who was killed in an accidental shooting from a 12-gauge shotgun on December 17, 1976. His age at the time of his death was 16.

== Acting career ==
Burgess made his acting debut on the big screen at the age of 11 in Big Jake with John Wayne. He did not act again professionally until the age of 18, at which time he started appearing in a long series of regional and national television commercials, including Skippy (peanut butter), Coca-Cola, and Chevrolet. He has also made guest appearances on TV shows like The Evidence on the WB Network and episodes of the TV series Man, Moment, Machine and Hunting Bonnie & Clyde on The History Channel, in addition to starring in the critically acclaimed The World's Astonishing News: BTK Killerfor Japanese TV. He has also appeared in several feature films, including The Dead Pool (with Clint Eastwood), Best of the Best (with Eric Roberts), and L.A. Story (with Steve Martin and Marilu Henner). He spent the bulk of his earlier acting career 1978 - 2000 mostly writing, performing on the stage and doing voice-overs for TV commercials, film, radio voice over projects, announcing and comedy segments, television, and a few independent film projects.

=== Recent career ===
Burgess has spent the greatest part of the past several years writing screenplays and acting and working with independent filmmakers. In 2005, he returned to mainstream film, appearing in Rent (with Rosario Dawson), and in 2007 he starred in the French language film, Michel et Odette, a film-noir style production with English subtitles. He was also featured in several TV commercials, including SONY, Cingular, Nissan and also a Rolex print ad. He currently has screenplays registered with The Writers Guild of America, West.

== Personal life ==
He married Angelita Nobles Oehler on December 19, 1991. His wife did not work in the entertainment industry. The marriage did not produce children.

Burgess has homes in the San Francisco Bay Area, Los Angeles, Lake Tahoe and Las Vegas. He has a collection of high-end guitars and is naturally an avid guitarist. He is also a prolific online blogger. Politically, Burgess declares himself an American Independent with some conservative leanings. He lists his religion as being Eastern Orthodox.

== Filmography and television ==
Year	Film	Role	Notes
1971	Big Jake	Little Boy	(uncredited)
1988	The Dead Pool	Bar Patron	(uncredited)
1989	Best of the Best	Tournament Fighter	(uncredited)
1991	L.A. Story	Waiter	(uncredited)
2005	Love Sucks	Boba Ball #12	
2005	Rent	New Year's Celebrant	(uncredited)
2005	Man, Moment, Machine	Bank Teller; Industrialist	2 episodes
2005	The World's Astonishing News	Older Dennis Rader	1 episode
2006	The Evidence	Pharmacy Patient	(uncredited); 1 episode
2007	Michael et Odette	Julien Travernier	
