= Ron Burgess =

Ron Burgess may refer to:

- Ron Burgess (footballer) (1917–2005), footballer and manager
- Ronald L. Burgess Jr. (born 1952), US Army general
- Ronnie Burgess (1963–2021), American football player
