= Pete Burgess =

New Zealand basketball player

Personal information
- Born: 13 June 1984 (age 42) Timaru, New Zealand
- Listed height: 184 cm (6 ft 0 in)
- Listed weight: 84 kg (185 lb)

Career information
- Playing career: 2008–2010
- Position: Point guard

Career history
- 2008: Otago Nuggets
- 2010: Southland Sharks

Peter Burgess (born 13 June 1984) is a New Zealand former professional basketball player. Born in Timaru, Canterbury, Burgess played for the Otago Nuggets in 2008 and the Southland Sharks in 2010. He also played numerous years in the second division Conference Basketball League, including the Otago A team in 2008 and the Southland Flyers in 2010.
