= Don Burgess =

Don Burgess may refer to:

- Don Burgess (cinematographer) (born 1956), American cinematographer
- Don Burgess (ice hockey) (born 1946), retired professional ice hockey player
- Don Burgess (politician), Canadian politician, see 1977 Ontario general election
- Donald Burgess (born 1933), retired track cyclist
- Donald W. Burgess (born 1947), American meteorologist, tornado and weather radar expert
