= Mark Burgess =

Mark Burgess may refer to:

- Mark Burgess (cricketer) (born 1944), New Zealand cricketer
- Mark Burgess (children's author) (born 1957), English writer and illustrator of children's books
- Mark Burgess (playwright) (born 1960), writer of A Modern Love Story, actor and teacher at Bedford Modern School
- Mark Burgess (computer scientist) (born 1966), Norwegian computer scientist
- Mark Burgess (actor) in Prince Charming
- Vox (musician) (born Mark Burgess, 1960), English musician
