= Colin Burgess =

Colin Burgess may refer to:

- Colin Burgess (archaeologist) (1938–2014), British archaeologist with a specialization in the Bronze Age
- Colin Burgess (author) (born 1947), Australian author and historian
- Colin Burgess (musician) (1946–2023), Australian drummer
