= Mac Burgess =

English football manager

Managerial career
- Years: Team
- 1934–1935: Le Havre

Mac Burgess was an English professional football manager who coached French team Le Havre between 1934 and 1935.
