= David Burgess (footballer) =

New Zealand footballer

Personal information
- Full name: David J Burgess
- Place of birth: New Zealand
- Position: Midfielder

Senior career*
Years	Team	Apps	(Gls)
- Miramar Rangers

International career
1983–1984	New Zealand	4	(0)
- * Club domestic league appearances and goals

David Burgess is a former association football player who represented New Zealand at the international level.

Burgess made his full All Whites debut in a 2-0 win over Ghana on 7 June 1983 and ended his international playing career with four A-international caps to his credit, his final cap a substitute appearance in a 0-2 loss to South Korea on 22 April 1984.

He has since become a journalist, with stints at newspapers including The Dominion Post in Wellington where he was the local council reporter. He also maintains a keen interest in the Wellington Phoenix football franchise, which he covered for the paper.
