= Edward Burgess =

Edward Burgess may refer to:

- Edward Burgess (yacht designer) (1848–1891), American yacht designer
- Edward Burgess (British Army officer) (1927–2015), British Army general
- Edward M. Burgess (born 1934), American chemist
- Edward Sandford Burgess (1855–1928), American botanist
- Edward Burgess (architect) (c. 1850–1929), British architect
- Edward Burgess (merchant) (1810–1855), English merchant and British subject in Qajar Iran
