= Robert Burgess =

Robert Burgess may refer to:

- Robert Forrest Burgess (born 1927), American writer
- Rob Burgess (1957–2025), Canadian tech industry executive
- Bobby Burgess (born 1941), American dancer and singer
- Robert Burgess (boxer) (born 1952), Bermudan boxer
- Sir Robert Burgess (sociologist) (1947–2022), Vice-Chancellor of the University of Leicester
- Robert Burgess (rugby union) (1890–1915), Irish rugby player
