= Richard Burgess =

Richard Burgess may refer to:

- Richard Burgess (biblical scholar) (1796–1881), British cleric, biblical scholar and antiquarian
- Richard Burgess (murderer) (1829–1866), British-born murderer in New Zealand
- Richard James Burgess (born 1949), British record producer
- Richard Burgess (footballer) (born 1974), English footballer
- Rick Burgess, comedy/talk radio host in Alabama, part of Rick and Bubba

== See also ==
- Richard Burges (disambiguation)
- Dick Burgess (Daniel Burgess, 1896–1983), English footballer
- Dick Burgess, a character on The Van Dyke Show
