= Jim Burgess =

James or Jim Burges(s) may refer to:

- James Burgess (archaeologist) (1832–1916), British archaeologist active in India
- James Burgess (American football, born 1994) (born 1994), American football player
- James Burgess (American football, born 2002) (born 2002), American football player
- James Burgess (gridiron football) (born 1974), American football player
- James Burgess (attorney) (1915–1997), United States Attorney for the Southern District of Illinois
- James Burgess Jr., member of the Legislative Assembly of New Brunswick
- Jim Burgess (golfer), winner of 1980 Azalea Invitational golf tournament
- Jim Burgess (Ontario politician), Green Party candidate for Chatham-Kent—Essex in the Ontario general election, 2003
- Jim Burgess (producer) (1952–1993), disco record producer and disc jockey of the 1970s
- Sir James Lamb, 1st Baronet (1752–1824), born James Burges
- James Burgess (trade unionist) (1880–1945), Australian trade unionist
- James Burgess (sprinter) (born 1900), American sprinter, 400 m winner at the 1924 USA Outdoor Track and Field Championships

== See also ==
- Richard James Burgess (born 1949), musician
