= Harry Burgess =

Harry Burgess may refer to:

- Harry Burgess (footballer) (1904–1957), footballer for England, Stockport County, Sheffield Wednesday and Chelsea
- Harry Burgess (governor) (1872–1933), governor of the Panama Canal Zone
- Harry Burgess, singer from Adult Jazz

== See also ==
- Henry Burgess (disambiguation)
