= George Burgess =

George Burgess may refer to:

- George Henry Burgess (1831–1905), English-born landscape painter, wood engraver and lithographer
- George F. Burgess (1861–1919), American Democratic politician
- George K. Burgess (1874–1932), American physicist, scientific writer and translator, expert on metallurgy
- George Burgess (biologist) (born 1949), American shark expert and author
- George Burgess (bishop) (1809–1866), American clergyman and religious leader, first bishop of Episcopal Diocese of Maine
- George Burgess (politician) (1863–1941), New South Wales politician
- George Burgess (rugby league) (born 1992), English rugby league player
- George Burgess (rugby union) (1883–1961), New Zealand rugby union player

== See also ==
- George Burges (1786–1864), English literary scholar who specialised in classical Greek
