= Luke Burgess =

Luke Burgess may refer to:

- Luke Burgess (footballer) (born 1999), English association football player
- Luke Burgess (rugby league) (born 1987), English rugby league player
- Luke Burgess (rugby union) (born 1983), Australian rugby union player
