= Thomas Burgess (painter died 1807) =

British painter (died 1807)

Thomas Burgess (c. 1784–1807) was a landscape painter who exhibited at the Royal Academy from 1802 till 1806. He died, in the following year, in London, at the early age of twenty-three.

His address is given in the Royal Academy catalogues as 46, Sloane Square.

== Life ==
He was a son of William Burgess, and the earlier Thomas Burgess (fl. 1786) was his grandfather. He suffered from consumption, and died at his father's house in Sloane Square, Chelsea in November 1807.

== Works ==
On his first showing at the Royal Academy in 1802, Burgess contributed Market Gardener’s House at Walham Green. In 1803 he exhibited Landscape and Flowers; in 1804, Ruins of a Fire in Soho; and in 1805 and 1806, Derbyshire and Devonshire Views.
