= Daniel Maynard Burgess =

Daniel Maynard Burgess (December 21, 1828 – 1911) was a surgeon and explorer born in Otsego County, New York. He traveled extensively worldwide, particularly in Central and South America.

Burgess also served as a surgeon in the Civil War under General McClellan. He was present at the destruction of the first battleship Maine in Havana, Cuba.

Burgess died within minutes of giving final instructions on the publication of his memoir, in which he reminisces about numerous acquaintances of note including Presidents Grant, Arthur and Cleveland; Generals Winfield Scott, Philip Sheridan, and Robert E. Lee; Daniel Webster, Mark Hanna, Roscoe Conkling, William Tweed, Charles Dana, F. Hopkinson Smith, and King Edward VII of the United Kingdom.
