= Thomas Paul Burgess =

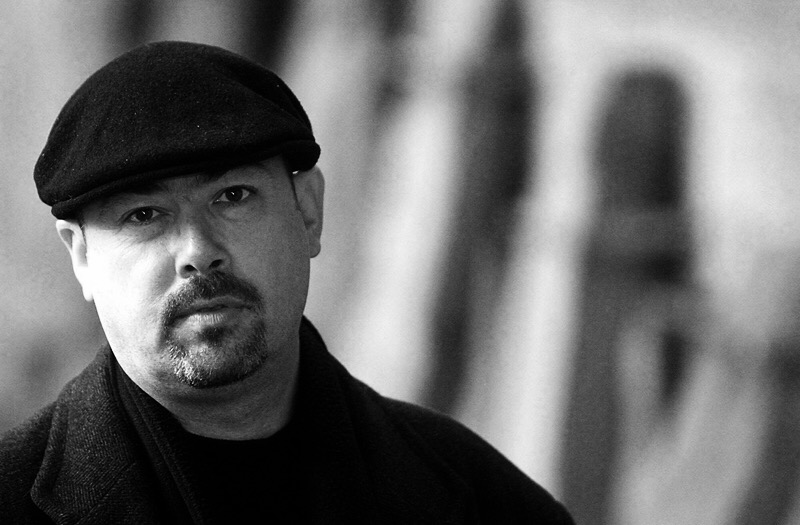
- Burgess in 2015

Background information
- Born: Thomas Paul Burgess; November 1959 (age 66); Shankill Road
- Origin: West Belfast, Northern Ireland.
- Genres: Folk; Americana; country; punk rock; heavy rock
- Occupations: Songwriter; musician; academic; novelist
- Instruments: Vocals; drums and percussion

Thomas Paul Burgess is an academic, novelist and musician from Belfast, Northern Ireland.

== Biography ==
Burgess attended Oxford University, studying Ethics & Moral Education, He obtained his PhD from University College Cork. He lives in Cork, Ireland, where he is a Senior Lecturer and Director of Youth & Community Work at The School of Applied Social Studies, University College Cork.

He worked in Short Brothers Ltd (aircraft manufacture), 1978-81. Following his academic studies, he taught English Literature in schools in Belfast and Oxford. In 1990, he was Community Relations Officer for Antrim Borough Council, and in 1992 was a researcher/outreach worker for Initiative '92, Torkel Opsahl

== Academic Publications ==
His published works include A Crisis of Conscience: - moral ambivalence and education in Northern Ireland (1993), The Reconciliation Industry: - community relations, community identity & social policy in Northern Ireland (2002), The Contested Identities of Ulster Protestants (2015) and The Contested Identities of Ulster Catholics (2018).

== Novels ==
His first novel, ‘White Church, Black Mountain’ (Matador. 2015) was short-listed for the Impress Prize for New Writers, 2017 and The Carousel Aware Prize for Best Novel, 2016.

His second novel, ‘Through Hollow Lands’ (Urbane 2018) is a dark supernatural thriller based loosely on Dante's ‘Inferno’ and follows survivors of the 9/11 attacks, through the seeming purgatory of Las Vegas. He has described it as, 'An allegorical tale on the death of American innocence.'

== Music ==
As a songwriter with his band Ruefrex his work met with acclaim, the group being described as "...the most important band in Britain".

He appeared on the cover of Melody Maker after they had recorded the controversial The Wild Colonial Boy denouncing Irish-Americans for sending guns and money to the IRA. The record entered the UK top 30. Their music was featured in the motion picture Good Vibrations.

His later projects include forming the musical collective Sacred Heart of Bontempi, and releasing a tribute to Pogues’ frontman, Shane MacGowan entitled, Shane MacGowan’s Smile (Burgess had previously toured with the band).

In 2021 Burgess wrote, performed and produced Vanished into Air; a song for the disappeared. The project was intended to highlight the plight of those families who lost members believed to have been abducted, murdered and secretly buried in Northern Ireland, the large majority of which occurred during the Troubles. The victim support group Wave and family members supported the initiative.

In 2024, Manchester University Press published Burgess’ memoir, Wild Colonial Boys: A Belfast Punk Story. It gave an uncompromising account of his time with his band Ruefrex and enjoyed critical acclaim from a number of sources.

== Discography ==
=== Albums ===
- Flowers for all Occasions (8 versions), Kasper Records, 1985

=== Singles & EPs ===
- One by One (5 versions), Good Vibrations Records
- Capital Letters (7"), Kabuki Records
- Paid in Kind (2 versions), One by One
- The Wild Colonial Boy (4 versions), Kasper Records
- In the Traps (2 versions), Kasper Records
- Political Wings (12"), Flicknife Records
- Shane MacGowan’s Smile, Espresso Records

=== Compilations ===
- Capital Letters... The Best of..., (CD, Comp), Cherry Red
