= Norine Burgess =

Canadian singer

Norine Burgess is a Canadian singer. She is a graduate of the University of Calgary and the University of Toronto’s Opera School, mezzo-soprano. She received additional training as a member of the Canadian Opera Company (COC) Ensemble where she appeared in Elektra, Suor Angelica, Lulu and Der Rosenkavalier. She also performed Le Le Nozze di Figaro (Cherubino), Ariadne auf Naxos (Dryad), La Traviata (Flora) and Die Zauberflöte (Second Lady) with the COC. Additional operatic successes include Le Nozze di Figaro (Cherubino) and Carmen (Mercedes) with the Vancouver Opera, Fenena in Nabucco with Manitoba Opera, Albert Herring (Nancy) with the Calgary Opera and many appearances with the Edmonton Opera.

Other appearances kept her closer to her home in Oakville include an all-Berlioz concert with soprano Donna Brown at the Glenn Gould Studio in Toronto, a fund-raising gala for Leukemia, and in concert with the Oakville Children's Choir for their 10th Anniversary.
