= William Burgess (painter) =

English painter (c. 1749–1812)

William Burgess (c.1749 – 1812) was an English artist.

== Life ==
The son of Thomas Burgess of the Maiden Lane Academy, he was a painter and art teacher. He showed at the Royal Academy between 1774 and 1811, and also at the Society of Artists and the Free Society of Artists. His exhibited works included portraits (some noted as drawings in the catalogues), drawings of animals, and landscapes, many of them of Welsh subjects. London addresses are given throughout his career: in Maiden Lane, Covent Garden; Kemp's Town Chelsea; Gloucester Street, Queen's Square; Great Maddox Street; Piccadilly; Michael's Grove, Brompton, and finally, from 1797, Sloane Square, Chelsea.

He died in London in 1812, aged 63. His son, H. W. Burgess, was landscape painter to William IV.

== Sources ==
- Goodwin, Gordon (1886). "Burgess, William (1749?-1812)" . In Stephen, Leslie (ed.). Dictionary of National Biography. Vol. 7. London: Smith, Elder & Co. p. 314.

Attribution
