= Thomas Burgess (painter, fl. 1786) =

British painter

Thomas Burgess was an 18th-century British painter.

== Life ==
Burgess received his art education at the St. Martin's Lane Academy, and on becoming in 1766 a member of the Incorporated Society of Artists, sent to its exhibitions numerous portraits, conversation-pieces, and studies of various life.

In 1778, when living in Kemp’s Row, Chelsea, he was represented for the first time at the Royal Academy by three pictures: William the Conqueror Dismounted by his Eldest Son, Hannibal Swearing Enmity to the Romans, and Our Saviour‘s Appearance to Mary Magdalen He later exhibited a self-portrait and some landscapes. His last contribution to the Academy, in 1786, was The Death of Athelwold

Burgess gained a high reputation as a teacher, and for some time kept a drawing school in Maiden Lane, Covent Garden, which had considerable success. Among his pupils was the portrait miniaturist Martha Isaacs.
